= Leade =

Leade may refer to:

- Jane Leade (or Lead) (1624–1704), English Christian mystic
- Leade, in firearms terminology, a portion of the barrel adjacent to the freebore

== See also ==
- Lead (disambiguation)
- Lede (disambiguation)
- Leed (disambiguation)
- Lied (disambiguation)
