= History of Wetherby =

Wetherby Coat of Arms. As displayed on the former telegraph pole, by the river. This shows the Knights Templar, as well as the River Wharfe (the blue bars). It was official granted on 7 January 1939

The recorded history of Wetherby began in the 12th and 13th centuries, when the Knights Templar and later the Knights Hospitallers were granted land and properties in Yorkshire. The preceptory founded in 1217 was at Ribston Park. In 1240, a Royal Charter of Henry III granted the Knights Templar the right to hold a market in Wetherby (known then as Werreby). The charter stated that the market should be held on Thursdays, and an annual fair was permitted lasting three days over the day of St James the Apostle.

From 1318 to 1319, the North of England suffered many raids from the Scots. After the Battle of Bannockburn, Wetherby was burned and many townspeople were taken and killed. According to the blue plaque at the entrance to Scott Lane, Wetherby could be named after the Scottish raiders in 1318 or, alternatively, after the 18th century drovers who used the location as a watering place.

In 1233, the Archbishop of York allowed remission of sins to those who contributed to the building of the Wetherby Bridge.

== Wetherby Castle ==
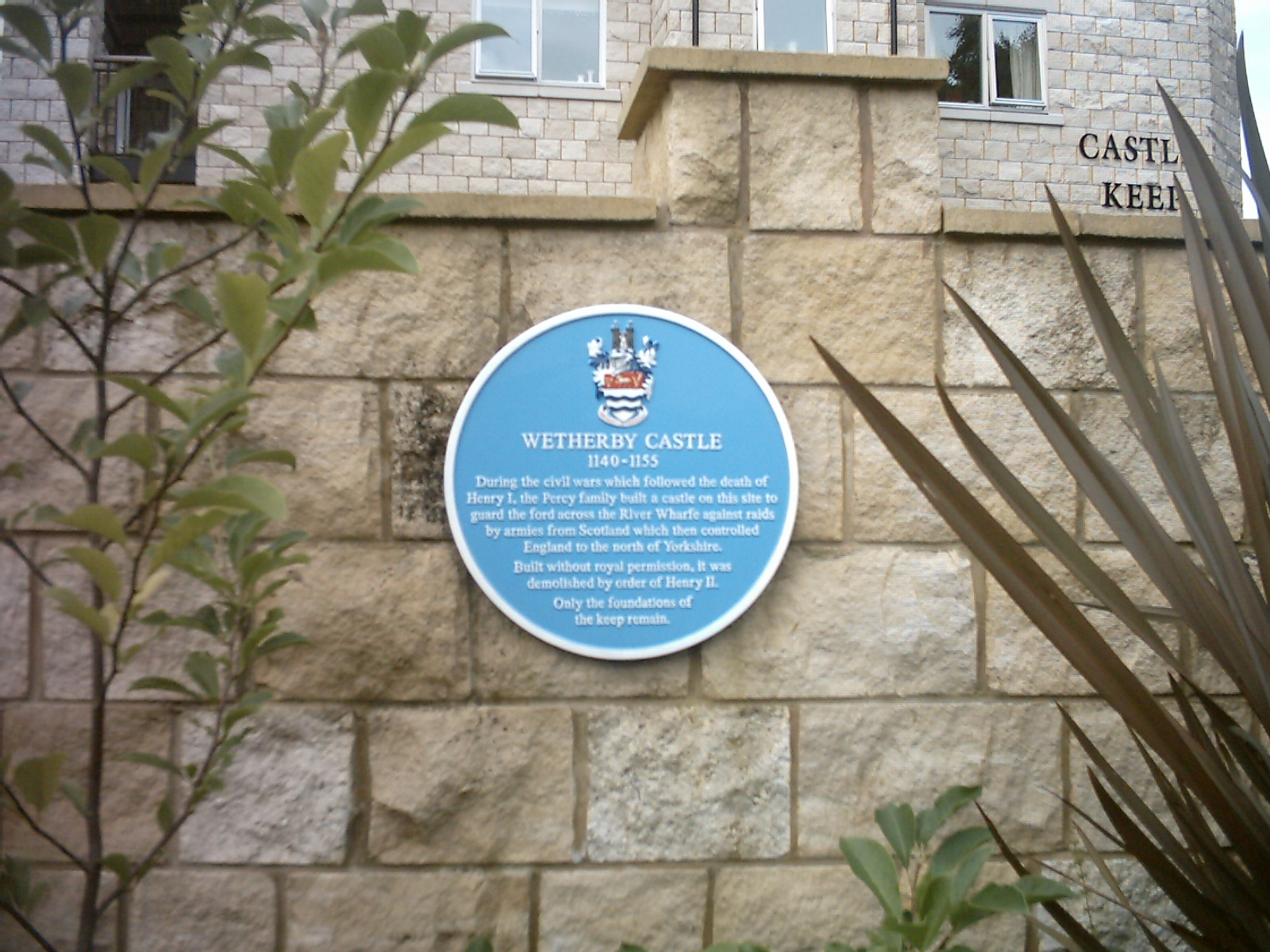
A blue plaque marking the site of Wetherby Castle

For 15 years, Wetherby was home to a castle built without the consent of the King or Parliament. It was constructed in 1140 by the Percy family to guard the crossing by the River Wharfe, particularly against prevalent raids by the Scots, who controlled most of England north of Yorkshire at the time. However, in 1155, King Henry II ordered the demolition of the castle. Only its foundations remain, very little of which comes above ground level. In 2005 and 2006, the three dwellings occupying this site were demolished and replaced by flats, named 'Castle Keep' to reflect its history, and marked with a blue plaque commissioned by Wetherby Town Council and Wetherby Civic Society.

== English Civil War ==
Wetherby played a small part in the English Civil War. In 1644, before marching to Tadcaster and on to Marston Moor, the Parliamentarians spent two days in Wetherby while joining forces with the Scots. Oliver Cromwell stayed in the Half Moon Inn, Collingham, before the Battle of Marston Moor.

== Cattle droving (1650s to 1850s) ==
From the 1650s to the 1850s, Wetherby's location on the Great North Road and as a major crossing of the sometimes turbulent River Wharfe were key points on the trading route for thousands of cattle being driven on foot from the Highlands of Scotland to the London meat market at Smithfield. During the Napoleonic period, this trade increased as the demand for barrelled salted beef for troops and sailors required a constant supply throughout those years. The main Market trysts (fairs) at Creiff and later Falkirk were the northern hubs where Scots drovers, having toured the Highlands during summer, would gather cattle by the tens of thousands.

These cattle were then parcelled into herds of 200, and droves were shod (with metal shoes) for the four-week march to East Anglia, where they could recoup a third of their lost body weight on lush lowland grazing, then sold at 'St Faiths', the main Norfolk tryst near Norwich before being walked again to London. The trade was constant.

On the 400-mile route from Scotland, lame cattle or those in poor condition were traded for healthy cattle at markets like Wetherby's, chartered in 1240. The surety of trade over generations helped give Wetherby its prosperity and business confidence over this long period of history. Its traders — not only butchers but tanners, grocers, weavers and mongers of all sorts — developed. From the third quarter of the eighteenth century, toll roads and the toll trusts hampered the free movement of the droving teams, as did the value of agricultural land with the agricultural revolution. With drilling seeds and four crop rotations, land values increased in the fertile, rich lowlands, and the previously free overnight 'stances' (free grazing rights) were 'charged' for or withdrawn for the drovers use altogether.

A final expansion in droving opportunities began with the Industrial Revolution, with new markets in northern England and the increasingly populated areas of Bradford, Sheffield and Leeds. The end of droving on a national scale finally came with the advent of railways, steam-driven coastal trade and refrigeration in the mid-1850s.

== Great Sale of Wetherby (1824) ==
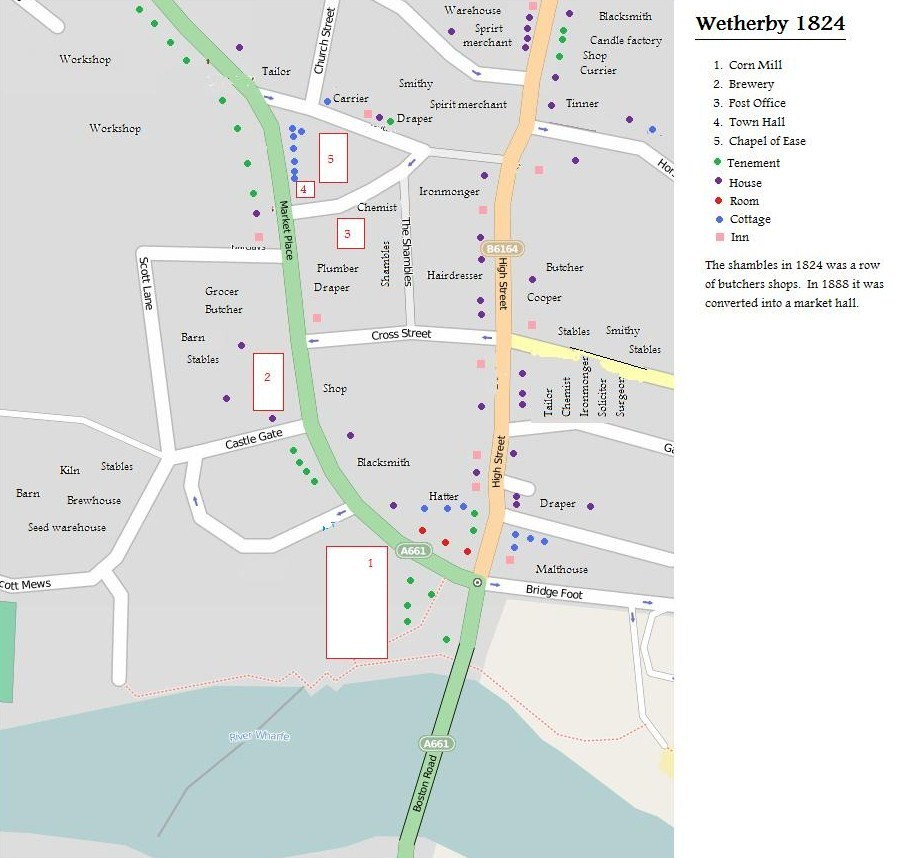
Wetherby Town Centre as it appeared at the time of the Great Sale of Wetherby in 1824.

To fund work on his house at Chatsworth, the Duke of Devonshire sold the Manor of Wetherby, with the exception of one house. It included many houses, businesses, a corn mill and a brewery. The 1824 sale catalogue included "nearly 200 dwellings," "two posting houses, three inns and seven public houses, … the Valuable Manor of Wetherby … and upwards of 1,300 acres." The catalogue for the sale of the "whole of the large market town of Wetherby (with the exception of one house therein)" describes Wetherby as an important stop on the high turnpike from Ferry Bridge to Glasgow.

On the first day of the sale, the Swan and Talbot sold for £1,510; on the second day, the Crown, the Red Lion and the Blue Boar sold for £2,870. An example from the catalogue regarding the sale of The Crown Inn on High Street:

Lot Number: 66
Occupiers: Widow Smith
Description: The Crown Inn, in High Street, containing on the ground floor, two parlours, dining room, a back room, bar and scullery; cellar, four bedchambers and a small room. In the back yard in a brewhouse, store room, coal house, barn, cow house, pig cotes, a seven stall stable with granary over: another stable with a malt room over, and a box stable. These premises extend onto the market place.

== The Victorian era ==
=== Industrialisation ===
In Victorian times, Wetherby was a rural town, though it was the major town for the surrounding rural districts where the cattle market was located. Wetherby industrialised during this era, though less than in the more textile-dependent areas of the West Riding. Wetherby's brewery and mill developed, while Teesdale and Metcalf built a factory on what is now the Horsefair Centre. Wetherby provided the setting for the novel Oldbury (1869) by Annie Keary. Although Wetherby's Victorian industrial development was neither notable nor significant, the industrial revolution did not bypass it, and the town experienced growth. The Wetherby area saw industrial expansion during the Second World War when munitions factories were built at Thorp Arch and in the 1960s at the Sandbeck Industrial Estate.

=== The building of the railways ===
In 1837, the Angel public house served two mail coaches daily. In the 1840s, the Harrogate to Church Fenton railway line was built. By the 1860s, the Wetherby News was campaigning to link Wetherby to Leeds by railway. In 1866, the NER began construction of the Cross Gates to Wetherby line, the link to Leeds. A railway station was built on Linton Road; the older railway station is now The Old Engine Shed dance hall, off York Road. From the building of the Cross Gates-Wetherby line until its closure, race day specials ran from Bradford Interchange to Wetherby.

=== Utilities ===
Wetherby Gasworks was opened in 1852 on what is now Gashouse Lane. It had two gasholders and closed in the late 1970s. Wetherby had a concrete water tower in the Spofforth Hill area, which was demolished in 1959. Although the gasworks no longer have gasholders or produce town gas since the conversion to natural gas, a gas site does still exist in the vicinity of Gashouse Lane and Victoria Street.

== Twentieth century to the present day ==
Wetherby High Street in 1900

=== Around the start of the 20th century ===
By around the start of the 20th century, Wetherby had a mixed economy. The town had a large mill, which employed many in the town. The trades that had kept Wetherby going in earlier decades still thrived, such as the cattle market and the town's many inns, which served travellers on the A1, though the growth of the railways in the 19th century had lessened Wetherby's strategic position on the Great North Road. By this time, Wetherby had rail links to Leeds, Harrogate and York and had its own gas works, producing town gas.

=== The world wars ===
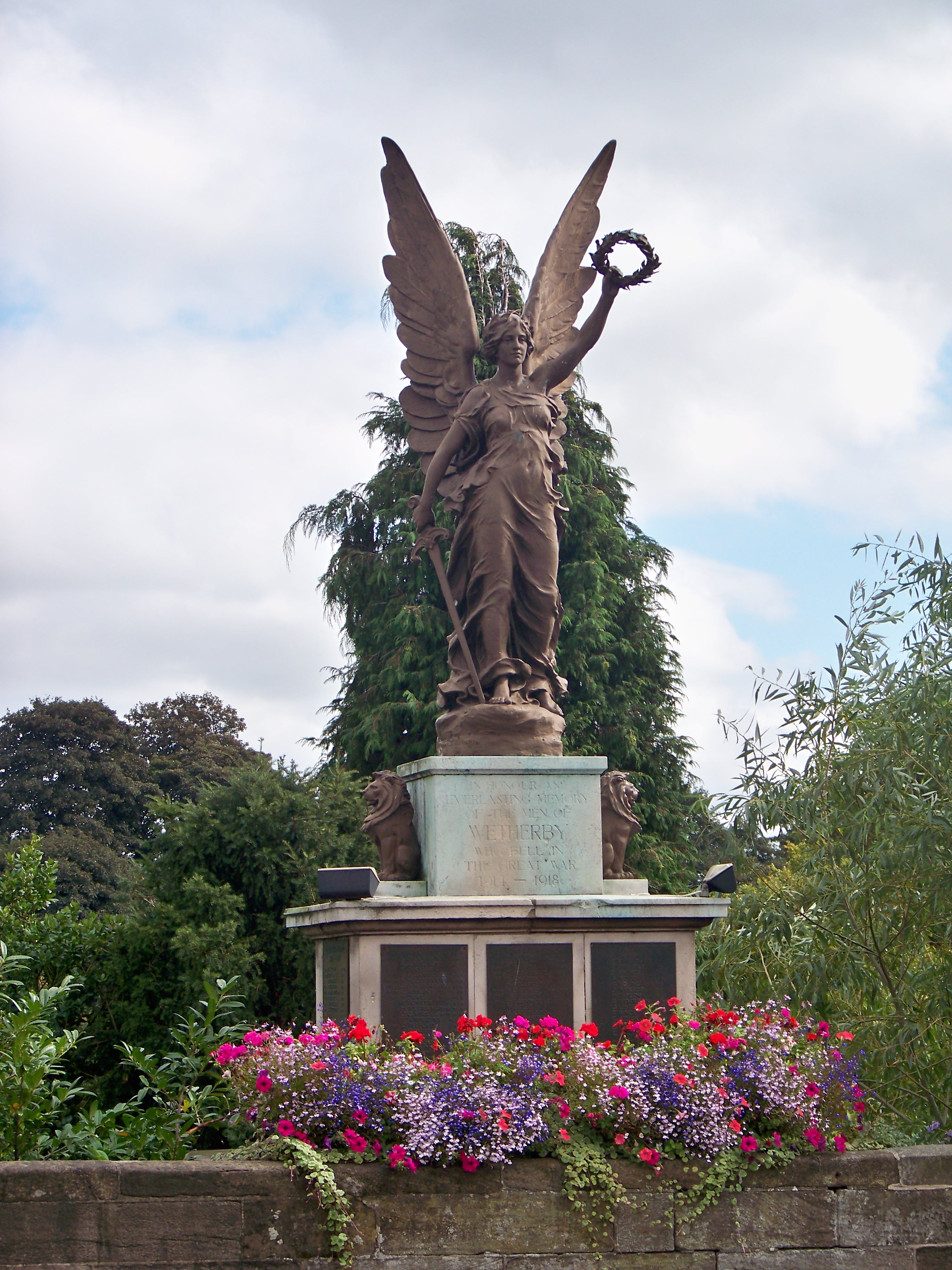
Memorial to the Great War in Wetherby

Like many other towns in the West Riding, Wetherby suffered heavy losses in the First World War, with many Wetherby men attached to the Leeds Pals, who suffered particularly heavy losses at the Battle of the Somme. Many Wetherby residents worked at the Barnbow munitions works in Cross Gates for the duration of the war. A memorial to the losses suffered by Wetherby in the Great War, designed by EF Roslyn, was erected adjacent to the town bridge in 1922. During the Second World War, the munitions factory ROF Thorp Arch, on what is now the Thorp Arch trading estate, was built outside the town, providing wartime employment for many in the town as well as across Leeds. Following the War, Wetherby had the country's only inland 'landship', HMS Ceres, situated on the site now occupied by Wetherby High School. Wetherby, however, lacks a memorial to its losses in the Second World War.

=== Brewery ===
For many years, the town was home to Wharfedale Brewery, which became Oxley's mineral water factory during the inter-war years. The factory was demolished in the 1950s, with the chimney imploding in 1959. It was redeveloped as the West Yorkshire bus depot and bus station. It has since been further redeveloped to include shops, offices and a restaurant, in addition to the bus station. The nearby watermill, which was situated by the weir, is now the site of luxury riverside flats.

=== The closure of the railways ===
Both the LNER Cross Gates to Wetherby line and the Harrogate to Church Fenton line closed in 1965 under the Beeching Axe. Once the railway had been closed, the council deliberated over whether to convert the disused line into a central relief road; however, such plans never came to fruition. The line has since been converted into the Harland Way cycle track, linking Wetherby with Spofforth.

=== Town centre redevelopment ===
Throughout the 1960s, the town council deliberated over how best to enlarge the town centre to cope with the needs of a growing population and to provide the town with a purpose-built supermarket. Plans were put forward to enlarge the town over the ings, or to develop the town centre into a pedestrian precinct. There were two similar plans for this put forward. Both involved the demolition of the Red Lion public house and replacing it with offices. The first plan involved the pedestrianisation of High Street and North Street and a central bypass being built linking Boston Road with York Road, while the second involved pedestrianising the Market Place, allowing buses to use only the lower end to access the bus station. In the end, it was decided to build a purpose-built shopping precinct, the Horsefair Centre, which was built in the 1970s.

After the 1990s, when Morrisons acquired the Centre, it became apparent that the supermarket was too small and the Centre lacked parking. Throughout the 1990s and 2000s, the car park was extended over the former Burgess Factory (formerly Appleyard Farm Services) on Hallfield Lane and the playing fields of Wetherby High School. In 2003, the existing supermarket was demolished. Eleven months later, in 2004, a new flagship Morrisons was opened to anchor the Centre. This required the relocation of the Post Office, which was moved to a temporary unit on the Crossley Street Car Park, before moving to a new location on the Market Place, opposite its original location. While the supermarket was closed, free buses ran from Spofforth Hill to Morrisons in Starbeck and from Deighton Road to Morrisons in Boroughbridge. Later in July 2005, work began to enclose the Western wing of the precinct, which had previously been mostly open, and the glass canopy roof was completed in 2006.

=== Bypassing Wetherby ===
The town's bypass was originally constructed between 1957 and 1959. This started south of the town on the A58 and finished in Kirk Deighton. For many years, the town's bypass ran from a roundabout near a Forte Posthouse hotel, which was prone to lengthy queues during busy periods. The roundabout still remains, but the A1 was diverted in July 1988 at a cost of £11.5 million. On 18 December 2004 the northern section of the bypass was substantially diverted to a new section of the A1(M), bypassing Kirk Deighton, after construction work had begun in August 2003. The upgrade of the first section between Bramham and Wetherby started in July 2007 and was scheduled to be completed in 2009. The upgraded A1 includes a new motorway service station at the Wetherby North Junction (near Kirk Deighton), which includes another large hotel, the only one in Wetherby north of the River Wharfe. The Aberford to Wetherby stretch was upgraded later.

=== Industrialisation ===
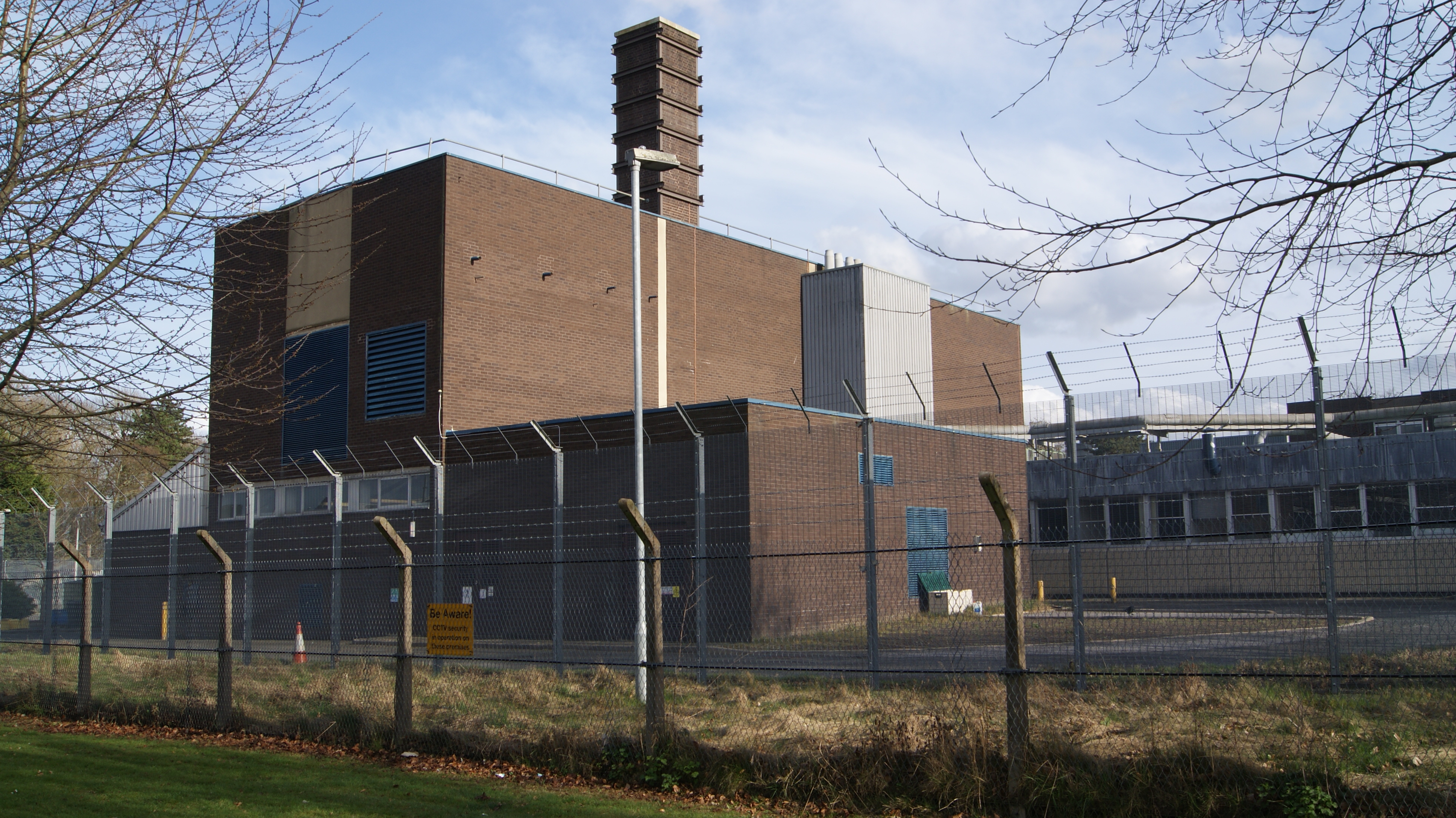
The forensic science laboratory in April 2013

Although the 20th century saw the loss of Wetherby's mill and brewery, it also saw the development of the Sandbeck Industrial Estate and the nearby Thorp Arch Trading Estate. The trading estate started life as munitions factories at the beginning of the Second World War. The Thorpe Arch trading estate attracted employers such as Farnell (electronic components), Safepack (packaging), Goldenfry (gravy and savoury food products), Swift Research (market research) and the forensic science laboratory. The forensic science laboratory closed in 2012, and demolition of the site began in May 2015.

== Blue plaques ==
Wetherby Town Council has for some years commissioned blue plaques to mark points of notable history. These have been erected at the site of the former castle, the former watermill, the town hall, the Angel public house, the former cattle market, the Red Lion public house, The Shambles and St James's Church, as well as other landmarks. The town has no museum of its own, but its history is well documented at Leeds Central Library.

== See also ==
- History of Hunslet
- History of Kirkstall
- History of Leeds
- History of Seacroft
