= Leedes =

Leedes is a surname. Notable people with the surname include:

- John Leedes (died 1656), English landowner and politician
- Thomas Leedes (died 1645), English politician

== See also ==
- Leeds (surname)
