= History of Leeds =

History of city in Yorkshire, England

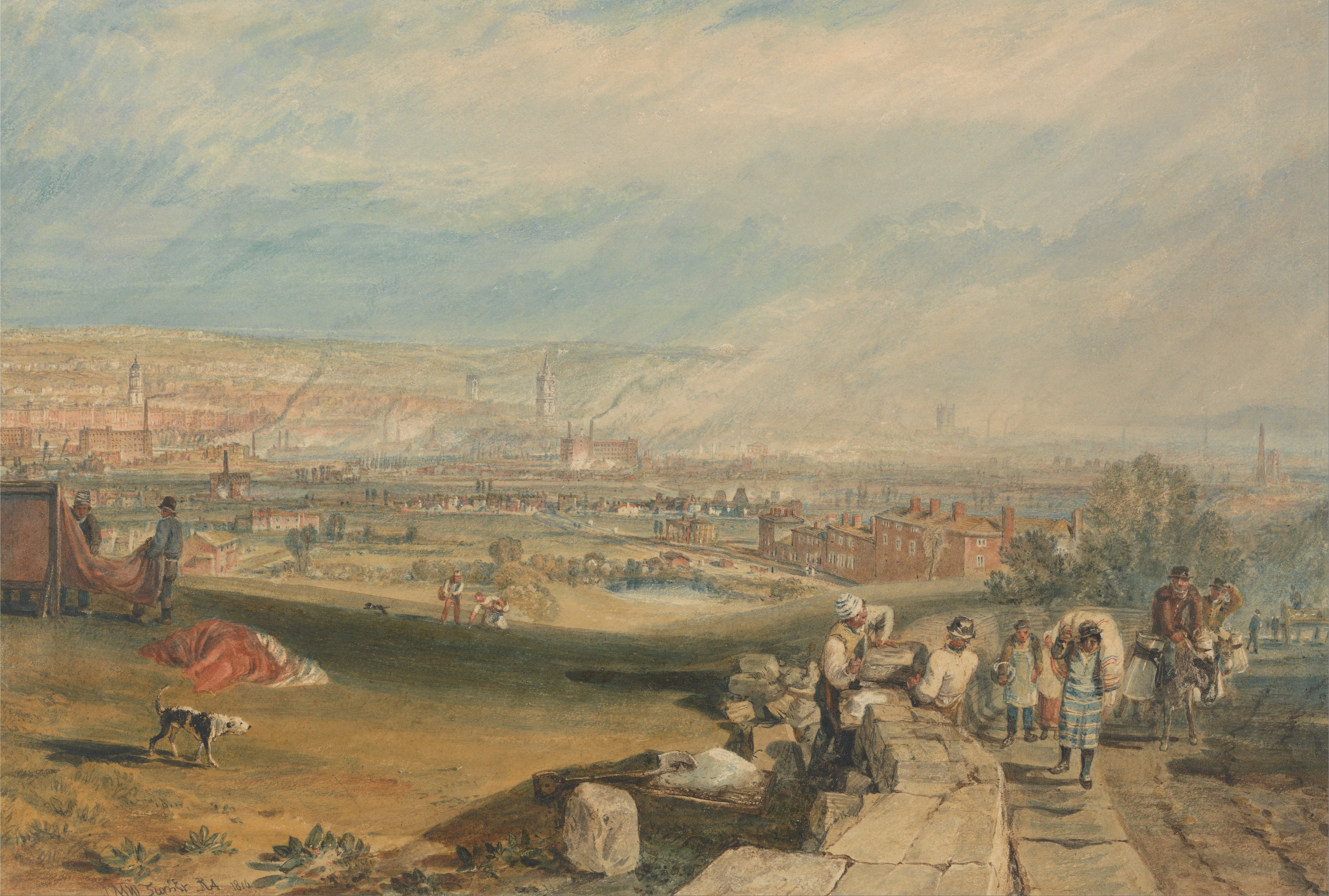
J. M. W. Turner's 1816 painting of Leeds, from Beeston Hill. At the left-hand edge is Marshall's Mill, in the centre is Holy Trinity Church, and further to the right, through the smoke, is the tower of Leeds Parish Church, now Leeds Minster.

Loidis, from which Leeds, Yorkshire derives its name, was anciently a forested area of the Celtic kingdom of Elmet. The settlement certainly existed at the time of the Norman conquest of England and in 1086 was a thriving manor under the overlordship of Ilbert de Lacy. It gained its first charter from Maurice de Gant in 1207 yet only grew slowly throughout the medieval and Tudor periods. The town had become part of the Duchy of Lancaster and reverted to the crown in the medieval period, so was a Royalist stronghold at the start of the English Civil War.

In the seventeenth and eighteenth centuries Leeds prospered and expanded as a centre of the woollen industry and it continued to expand rapidly in the Industrial Revolution. Following a period of post-industrial decline in the mid twentieth century Leeds' prosperity revived with the development of tertiary industrial sectors.

== Name origins ==
The name "Leeds" is first attested in the form "Loidis". Around 731 Bede mentioned it in book II, chapter 14 of his Historia ecclesiastica, in a discussion of an altar surviving from a church erected by Edwin of Northumbria, located in "...regione quae vocatur Loidis" ('the region known as Loidis'). This was evidently a regional name, but it subsequently occurs in the 1086 Domesday Book denoting a settlement, in the later Old English form Ledes. The 1725 map by John Cossins spells it as Leedes.

The name is not Old English in form, so is presumably an Anglo-Saxonisation of an earlier Celtic name. It is hard to be sure what this origin was.Mills's A Dictionary of British Place-Names prefers Celtic *Lādenses 'people living by the strongly flowing river'. This name may be derived from the Brittonic *lāto- meaning "rut, heat" (in animals ready to mate), an element represented in Welsh as llawd, "heat", and possibly cognate to Greek plōtós, "flowing".

It has been surmised that the name denoted either a forest covering most of the kingdom of Elmet, which existed during the fifth century into the early seventh, or an early river-name, presumably that of the River Aire.

An inhabitant of Leeds is locally known as a Loiner, possibly derived from Loidis.

Leeds City Council maintains "a photographic archive of Leeds" using the title "Leodis", thought to be a further Old English or Celtic form of the name.

== Prehistoric to Anglo-Saxon periods ==
Scattered Bronze Age objects have been found throughout the Leeds area. 19th-century records documented two Bronze Age barrows on Woodhouse Moor.

In the pre-Roman and Roman Iron Age, the vicinity of Leeds was associated with the Brigantes. Brigantian remains have been found in villages and towns nearby. Possible Roman-period earthworks and a paved ford across the River Aire have been discovered also supposed to date to Roman times. There are Roman remains in nearby settlements, notably at Adel, and at Alwoodley; in the suburb of Headingley a stone coffin was found in 1995 at Beckett's Park which is believed to date from Roman times.

There is no dependable reference to any Roman, British or early Anglo-Saxon predecessor settlements to Leeds before Bede's mention - in circa 730 AD. That mention was to a region rather than a village or town. Bede's account indicates activity in the vicinity of Leeds, though not necessarily near the town as it is now known. His unidentified place-name Campodonum might refer to an important place in the area. Abbot Thrythwulf had a monastery nearby in Bede's time, though it did not last long into the medieval period. Campodonum is possibly, Elmet capital and Roman fort (analysed as camp+(l)odonum), Cambodunum. Cambodunum is a possible earlier Latin form name of Camelot, likely due to its location and early Brittonic ties.

Evidence for major wealth and status comes from fragments of at least six stone crosses/other monuments, with the ninth- to tenth-century decoration characteristic of Anglo-Scandinavian culture, which were found in the fabric of the 14th-century Leeds Parish Church when it was demolished and replaced in 1838, now site of Leeds Minster. The best preserved, now in the modern church, depicts alongside other images the story of Wayland the Smith.

Leeds's profile was raised by the 2008-09 discovery of the West Yorkshire Hoard, a small, probably tenth- or eleventh-century treasure hoard of items from the early 7th century onwards, in the Leeds area. It seems likely that the Anglo-Saxon settlement consisted largely of an ecclesiastical site, a ford over the River Aire, and Kirkgate. Other evidence for occupation in the Anglo-Saxon period lies in the old Shire Oak at Headingley, which is believed to have lent its name to the wapentake of Skyrack, and in the presence of many places around Leeds which have the termination of their names in ley: such as Bramley, Rodley, Farnley, Armley, Wortley, and Farsley, which is derived from the Anglo-Saxon leah, an open place in the wood.

== Norman period ==
Leeds parish is thought to have developed from a large British estate sub-divided, under Anglo-Saxon occupation, into smaller land holdings. The ancient estate straddled the wapentakes of Morley and Skyrack, encompassing Leeds, Headingley, Allerton, Gipton, Bramley, Armley, Farnley, Beeston and Ristone (Wortley). Leeds parish in Skyrack was the most important of these holdings. Leeds was then further sub divided so that when the first dependable historical record about Leeds (as "Ledes") was written in the Domesday Book of 1086, it was recorded as having comprised seven small manors in the days of Edward the Confessor.

At the time of the Norman conquest, Leeds was evidently a purely agricultural domain, of about 1,000 acres (4 km^{2}) in extent. It was divided into seven manors, held by as many thanes; they possessed six ploughs; there was a priest, and a church, and a mill: its taxable value was six pounds. When the Domesday records were made, it had slightly increased in value; the seven thanes had been replaced by twenty-seven villeins, four sokemen, and four bordars. The villeins were what we should now call day-labourers: the soke or soc men were persons of various degrees, from small owners under a greater lord, to mere husbandmen: the bordars are considered by most specialists in Domesday terminology to have been mere drudges, hewers of wood, drawers of water. The mill, when this survey was made, was worth four shillings. There were 10 acres (40,000 m^{2}) of meadow. The tenant in chief was Ilbert de Lacy to whom William the Conqueror had granted a vast Honour stretching widely across country from Lincolnshire into Lancashire, and whose chief stronghold was at Pontefract Castle, a few miles to the south-east.

That Leeds was owned by one of the chief favourites of William was fortunate; the probability is that the lands of the de Lacy ownership were spared when the harrying of the North took place. While the greater part of the county was absolutely destitute of human life, and all the land northward lay blackened, Leeds in 1086 had a population of at least two hundred people.

There were two significant foci to the settlement; the area around the parish church and the main manorial landholding half a mile to the west of the church. In 1399, according to the Hardynge Chronicle, the captive Richard II was briefly imprisoned at Leeds, before being transported to another de Lacy property at Pontefract, where he was later executed.

The kyng then sent kyng Richard to Ledis,
there to be kepte durely in previtee;
fro thens after to Pykering went he needis,
and to Knaresbro' after led was he
but to pontefrete last where he did dee.

In 1147, Cistercian monks settled at Kirkstall, and there from about 1152 began to build Kirkstall Abbey.

== First borough charter ==
Leeds was subinfeudated – along with much other land in Yorkshire, by the de Lacy family to the Paynel family; Ralph Paynel is mentioned often in the Domesday entries. He was one of the principal tenants-in-chief in Yorkshire. It was from a descendant of the Paynels, sometimes described as Maurice de Gant, that the inhabitants of Leeds received their first charter, in November, 1207. Leeds had the geographical advantages of being on a river crossing and being on the York to Chester route as well as being close to the Wharfedale to Skipton route through the Pennines. The manorial lords were keen to increase their revenues by exploiting these advantages.

The preamble of the charter reads:

"I Maurice Paynall have given and granted and by this charter confirmed to my burgesses of Leeds and their heirs franchise and free burgage and their tofts and with each toft half an acre of land for tillage to hold these of me and my heirs in fief and inheritance freely quit and honourably rendering annually to me and my heirs for each toft and half an acre of land sixteen pence at Pentecost and at Martinmas."

The charter made various provisions for the appointment of a bailiff (prator) to preside over a court of justice, to collect rents and dues, and to fine recalcitrants; others stipulated for aids when the lord needed monetary help, and placed tenants under obligation to grind corn at his mill and bake in his oven. Leeds was granted some rights of self-government and it had burgesses who were freemen. Yet the charter granted to the townspeople of Leeds only the lowest conditions needed for urban development. It did not transform the manor into a borough but established a borough within a manor. It was not coextensive with the manor but consisted of only a group of tenements within it.

The new town was laid out along the line of a street, later to be called Briggate, which was wide enough to hold a market, with about thirty burgage plots on either side. The south end of the street had a river crossing but the earliest recorded bridge, from which its name is derived (bridge gate), is in 1384. The population was small in 1207 and remained scanty for a long time afterwards. At the time of the Poll Tax of 1379 it appears not to have exceeded three hundred persons at the very outside; it was certainly one of the smallest towns in Yorkshire, such places as Snaith, Ripon, Tickhill, and Selby exceeding it in importance. Even in the thirteenth century, Leeds consisted of several distinct areas of habitation and activity. There was the old settlement around the parish church, the newly founded borough, the manor house and mill to the west and the town fields at Burmantofts (borough men's tofts). By establishing the borough the manorial revenues were increased and Leeds became more prosperous. Tax returns of 1334 and 1377 show that population of the whole parish before the Black Death was about 1,000 people of whom 350 to 400 lived in the central area including the borough. Leeds began to rank with the more prosperous towns to the east.

In 1217 Maurice de Gant lost the Leeds estate by figuring on the wrong side at the battle of Lincoln. His holding passed from him to Ranulf, Earl of Chester, and through him reverted to the de Lacy family; when the de Lacy estates became merged by marriage in the Duchy of Lancaster they passed to the royal family, and, on the accession of Henry IV, were absorbed into the possessions of the Crown.

== Late Middle Ages ==
For four centuries after the Norman invasion, the growth of Leeds was slow. Its site had no particular military advantages: the great strategic position of that part of Yorkshire was at Pontefract, close by. It had, at first, no commercial values—it may have been that its first beginnings in its staple wool trade sprang from the wool growing of the Cistercians at Kirkstall Abbey, on its western borders. The township was concerned with little more than agriculture, and such trade as it knew was confined to those retailings which establish themselves wherever communities spring up—dealings in the necessities of life, which, reduced to a minimum, are merely food and clothing. The town itself was small—it was probably confined within a triangle formed on the lines of the present lower Briggate, Kirkgate, and the River Aire, with the parish church at one angle somewhere about, perhaps on, the site of the modern one.

The streets would be narrow, unpaved and unlighted. The houses, in spite of the fact that stone is so plentiful in the district, were of wood, whitewashed, in many cases, thatched. St Mary's Whitkirk is the only medieval church remaining, a 15th-century building replacing an earlier one. All around the town lay the open fields and meadows, cultivated on the principle of strip-farming. And beyond these lay the forest of Elmet.

== Tudor period and incorporation ==
The Tudor period was a time of transition for Leeds, from a relatively mean settlement to a solid cloth-trading town. In 1470, it was obscure enough to be described as being "near to Rothwell", which in the fifteenth century had the rights of a market town. By 1536, when John Leland visited it, he was able to report of it that it was a pretty market town which stood most by clothing and was as large as Bradford, though not so "quik", by which he evidently meant not so enterprising. Nevertheless, much of the old life and conditions still existed. The Crown was now over-lord, and had been so ever since the accession of Henry IV, and the folk still ground their corn at the King's mills and baked their bread at the King's oven. There was as yet no charter of incorporation, and though the people were rapidly approaching to conditions of liberty their lot was still not very appreciably different from that of their forefathers. Up to the end of the sixteenth century Leeds may be looked upon as existing in semi-feudalism.

There is no mention of education in Leeds until 1552, when one William Sheafield, who seems to have been a chantry priest of St. Catherine in Leeds, left property in the town for the establishment of a learned school-master who should teach freely for ever such scholars, youths, and children as should resort to him, with the wise proviso that the Leeds folk themselves should find a suitable building and make up the master's salary to ten pounds a year. Here is the origin of Leeds Grammar School which, first housed in the Calls, and subsequently—through the beneficence of John Harrison—in Lady Lane, had by the end of that century become an institution of vast importance.

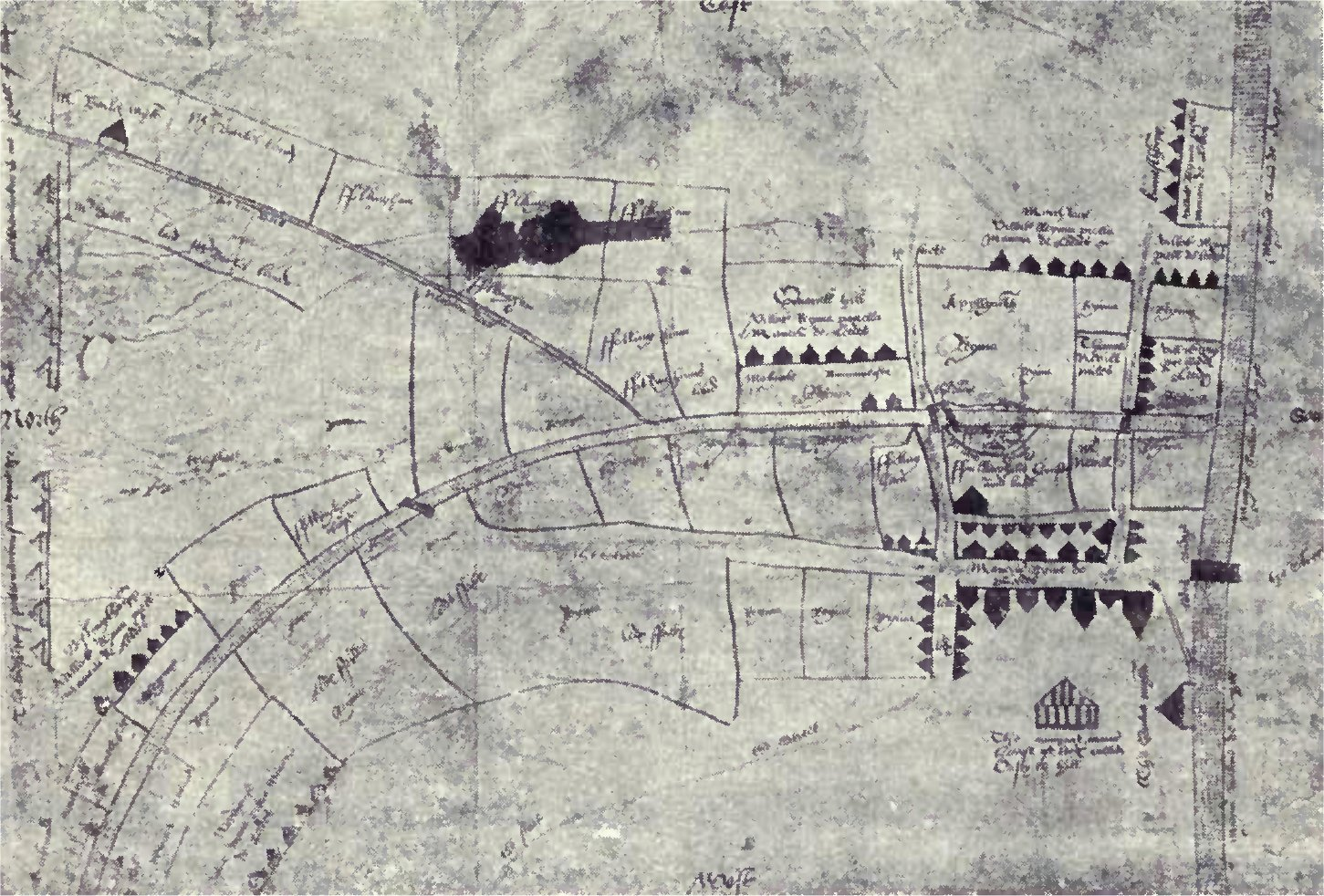
A 1560 map of Leeds

As the sixteenth century drew to a close, and while the seventeenth was still young, the towns-folk of Leeds secured in the first instance at their own cost, in the second by a strictly limited Royal favour two important privileges—the right of electing their own vicar and of governing themselves in municipal affairs. In 1583 the town bought the advowson of the parish church from its then possessor, Oliver Darnley, for £130, and henceforth the successive vicars were chosen by a body of trustees—the most notably successful experiment in popular election which has ever been known in the National Church. In 1626, Leeds received its first charter of incorporation from Charles I. The charter, premising that Leeds in the County of York is an ancient and populous town, whose inhabitants are well acquainted with the Art and Mystery of making Woollen Cloths, sets up a governing body of one Alderman, nine Burgesses, and twenty Assistants. But the privilege for some years was a limited one: the Crown reserved to itself the rights of appointment to any of the thirty vacancies which might occur by death: popular election did not come for some time.

In 2026 Leeds City Council are planning a series of events to celebrate the four hundredth anniversary of its Royal Charter.

== English Civil War and political representation ==
Eighteen years after the granting of the charter of incorporation, Leeds joined with other towns in the neighbourhood in a Memorial to the King wherein he was besought to settle his differences with the rebellious Parliament. Of this no notice was taken, and in the earlier stages of the Civil War the town was garrisoned for the Royal cause under Sir William Savile. But it was a very small Leeds which he occupied for the King in January 1643, having under him 500 horse and 1,500 foot. He made elaborate preparations for the defence of the place, digging a six-foot trench from St. John's Church by Upper Headrow, Boar Lane, and Swinegate to the banks of the river; erecting breastworks at the north end of the bridge, and placing demi-culverins in a position to sweep Briggate. Against him on Monday, January 23, advanced the redoubtable Sir Thomas Fairfax, at the head of a Parliamentary force which appears to have numbered at least 3000 horse and foot. Finding the bridge at Kirkstall broken down, Fairfax crossed the Aire at Apperley Bridge, and came on to Woodhouse Moor, from where he called on Savile to surrender. Savile returned the answer which was doubtless expected, and in the teeth of a heavy snowstorm, Fairfax led his troops forward to the assault. The action began about two o'clock of the afternoon and appears to have developed on all sides of the town. It rapidly went in favour of the assailants, and by four o'clock the Parliamentarian leaders and their troops were in Briggate and Boar Lane, while Savile and others were fleeing for their lives. Fairfax took nearly 500 prisoners and immediately released them on their promising not to take up arms against the Parliament on any further occasion. Though not a very great affair, it settled the question of King or Commons so far as that part of the West Riding was concerned.

The Puritan regime followed on the first successes of the Parliamentarians, and Leeds saw two Puritan ministers placed in the parish church and the new church of St. John. But in 1644 Leeds folk had something else to think: an epidemic, so serious as to rank with the medieval visitations of plague, broke out, and resulted in the death of 1300 inhabitants. The weekly markets were discontinued, and deaths occurred with such startling rapidity that it was impossible to keep pace with them in the parish registers.

In 1646 Charles I. came to Leeds a prisoner. After his surrender to the Scottish generals at Kelham, near Newark, he was led northward to Newcastle; on his return from that city, he spent one night in the house called Red Hall, in Upper Head Row.

It seems curious that up to the middle of the seventeenth century Leeds had never been directly represented in Parliament. Many now quite insignificant places in Yorkshire had sent members to the House of Commons from a very early period--Malton, Beverley, Northallerton had returned members as far back as 1298; Otley had had two members for centuries. But it was not until 1654 that Adam Baynes was returned to sit at Westminster; he was returned again two years later with Francis Allanson as a second member. This representation came to an end at the Restoration in 1660, and Leeds had no more members of Parliament until the Reform Act 1832. But in 1661 it received some concession from the Crown which was perhaps of more importance to it—a new Municipal Charter. There had been some readjustment of the old one in 1642, but Charles II's Charter was of a far-reaching nature. It set up a Mayor, twelve Aldermen, twenty-four Assistants or Councillors, a Town Clerk, and a Recorder; it also provided for local election to vacancies. From the Charter of Charles I and that of his son are derived the well-known arms of the town. The owls are the Savile owls famous throughout the county, where the Saviles have been legion; the mullets figured on the arms of Thomas Danby, first Mayor. The dependent sheep typifies the wool trade.

In 1715 the first history of Leeds was written by Ralph Thoresby, entitled Ducatus Leodiensis; or the Topography of the antient and populous Town and Parish of Leedes.

Leeds was mainly a merchant town, manufacturing woollen cloths and trading with Europe via the Humber estuary and the population grew from 10,000 at the end of the seventeenth century to 30,000 at the end of the eighteenth. As a gauge of the importance of the town, by the 1770s Leeds merchants were responsible for 30% of the country's woollen exports, valued at £1,500,000 when 70 years previously Yorkshire accounted for only 20% of exports.

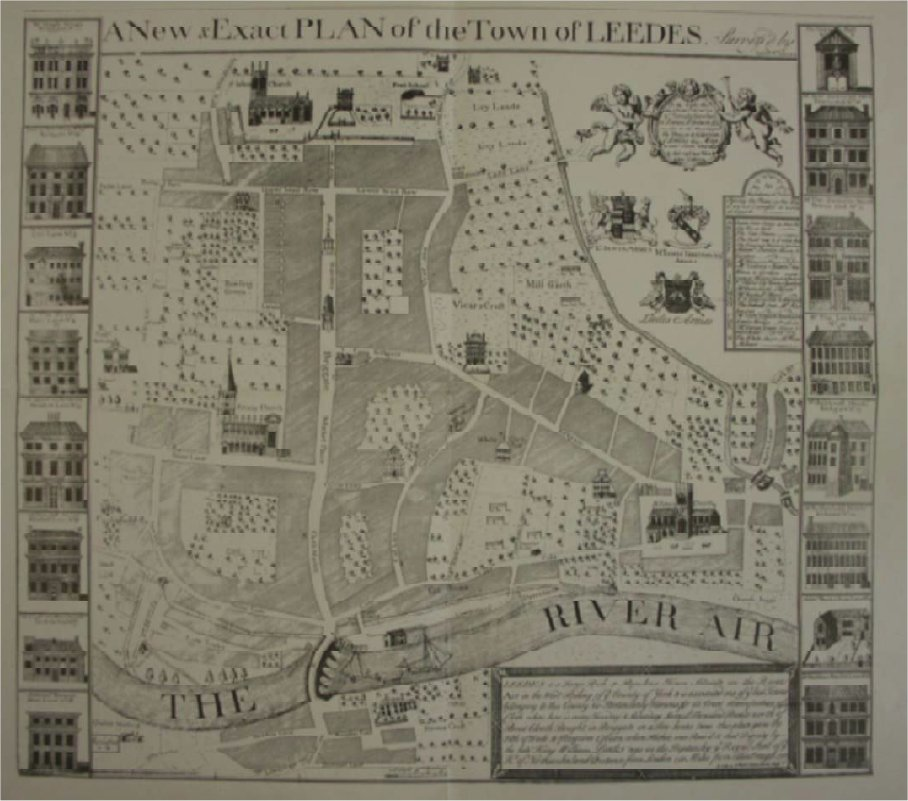
A 1725 map of Leeds

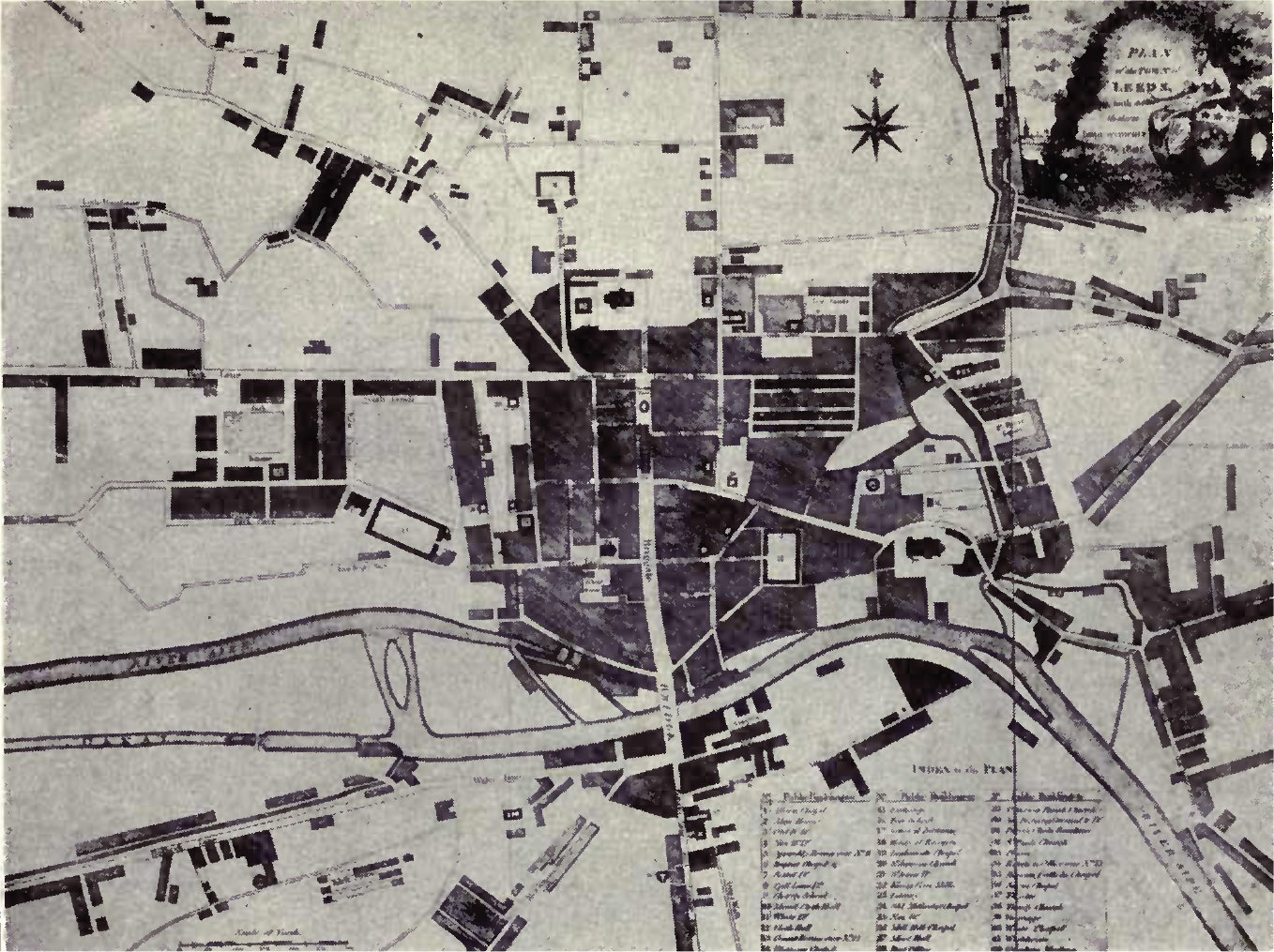
An 1806 map of Leeds

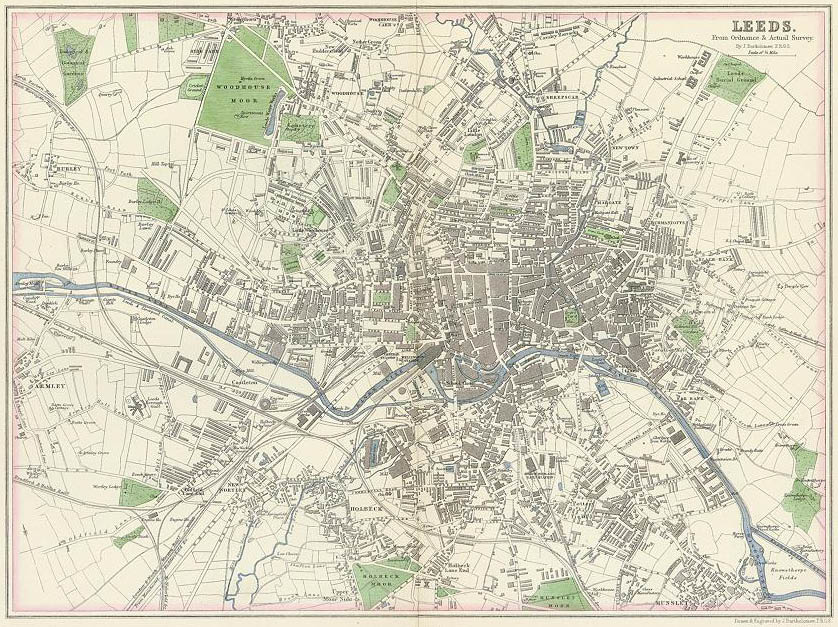
An 1866 map of Leeds

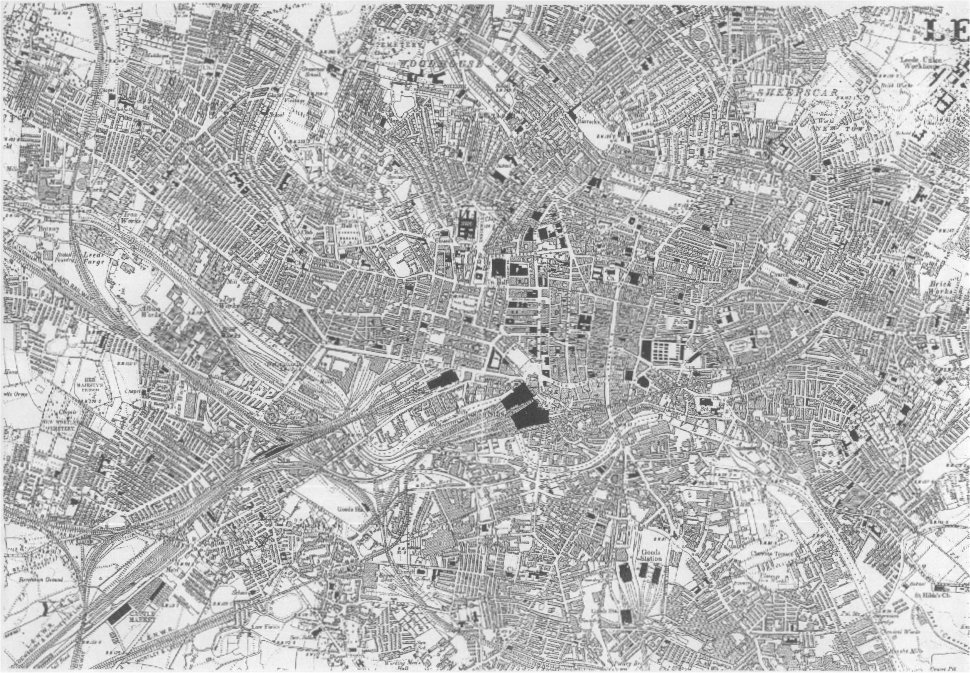
A 1900 map of Leeds

== Woollen cloth trade ==
During the Middle Ages, Cistercian monks, such as those at Kirkstall, were involved in sheep farming, and weaving was introduced to West Yorkshire during the reign of Edward III. Leland records the organised trading of woollen cloth in a market that took place on a bridge over the Aire, at the foot of Briggate; this trade occurred under tightly regulated conditions, including specific times. The cloth was predominantly manufactured in individual homes, in the villages surrounding Leeds. (Bradford, by contrast, was the centre of the worsted cloth trade.) There was a fulling mill at Leeds by 1400, and cloth dying may also have been an early centralised activity.

By the early 18th century, cloth trading had outstripped the capacity of the bridge, and had moved to trestle tables in up to two rows on each side of Briggate. Ralph Thoresby was involved in the establishment of the first covered cloth market, when with others he secured the permission of the 3rd Viscount Irwin, holder of the Manor of Leeds, to erect the White Cloth Hall. The fact of Wakefield having erected a trading hall in 1710 was almost certainly a driver of change. The new hall opened on 22 May 1711 (It lasted for 65 years before being removed to a new site in The Calls; by the mid-19th century it was taking place in a dedicated trading hall).

Daniel Defoe (c. 1720) mentions that Leeds traders also travelled all over the country, selling cloth on credit terms; and that an export trade existed. In 1758, a coloured or mixed cloth hall was built near Mill Hill – a quadrangular building 66 yards (60 m) by 128 yards (117 m), with capacity for 1800 trading stalls, initially let at three guineas per annum, but later at a premium of £24 per annum. (In the 1890s both the hall and a subsequent hall were demolished to make way for the new General Post Office and the Metropole Hotel.)

In 1831, a strike at Gotts Woollen Mill led to the establishment of the Yorkshire Trades Union. This soon dissolved, but in 1887 the Yeadon and Guiseley Factory Workers' Union was founded, this later becoming part of the National Union of Dyers, Bleachers and Textile Workers.

== Industrial Revolution expansion ==
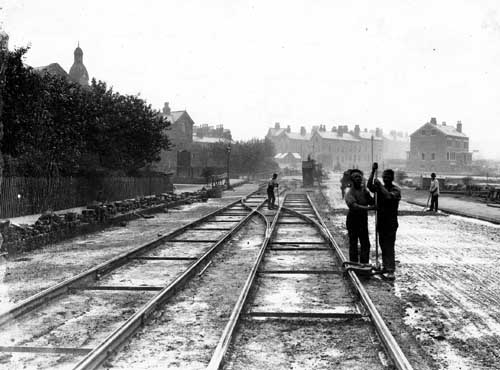
Construction of the former Leeds Tramway along Roundhay Road in Harehills, Leeds.

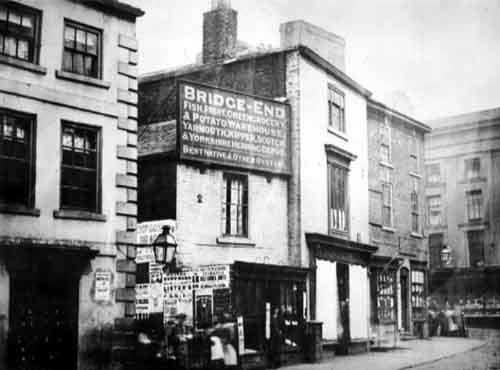
Bridge End in Leeds city centre, 1869.

The Industrial Revolution had resulted in the radical growth of Leeds whose population had risen to over 150,000 by 1840. The city's industrial growth was catalysed by the introduction of the Aire & Calder Navigation in 1699, Leeds and Liverpool Canal in 1816 and the railways from 1834 onwards; the first being the Leeds and Selby Railway opened on 22 September 1834. The first Leeds railway station was at Marsh Lane; the Leeds Wellington station was opened in 1848; the Central in 1854, and the New station in 1869. Little by little the town was linked up with Hull, York, Sheffield, Bradford, Dewsbury; with the Durham and Northumberland towns; with Manchester and Liverpool; and with the Midlands and London.

In 1893 Leeds had been granted city status. These industries that developed in the industrial revolution had included making machinery for spinning, machine tools, steam engines and gears as well as other industries based on textiles, chemicals and leather and pottery. Coal was extracted on a large scale and the still functioning Middleton Railway, the first successful commercial steam locomotive railway in the world, transported coal into the centre of Leeds. The track was the first rack railway and the locomotive (Salamanca) was the first to have twin cylinders.

Various areas in Leeds developed different roles in the industrial revolution. The city centre became a major centre of transport and commerce, Hunslet and Holbeck became major engineering centres. Armley, Bramley and Kirkstall became milling centres and areas such as Roundhay became middle class suburbs, the building of the Leeds Tramway allowing them better connections with the rest of the city.

== Wartime ==
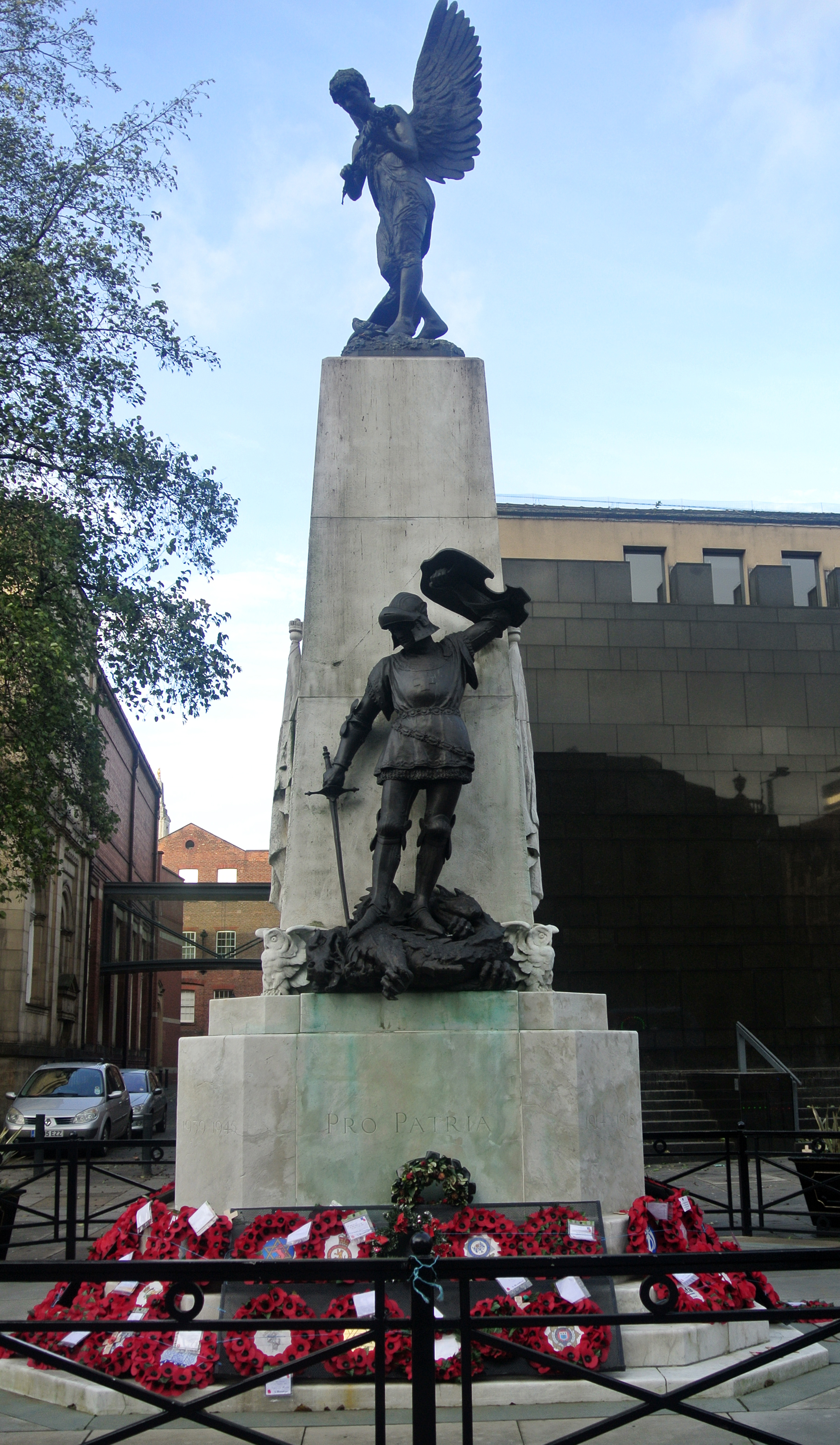
Leeds war memorial

=== First World War ===
Leeds made a notable contribution during the First World War.

==== Barnbow ====
Barnbow in Cross Gates was a large ammunitions factory producing ten thousand shells per week by August 1915. The worst tragedy ever to happen within Leeds (in terms of fatalities) happened at the Barnbow tragedy of 5 December 1916. 35 workers (all women aged 14 or over) were killed in the Barnbow Munitions Factory, which later became the Royal Ordnance Factory Barnbow. The plant employed 16,000 workers, from Leeds, Selby, Wakefield, Tadcaster and Wetherby and had its own railway station to cope with the daily influx of workers. The railway station had an 850-foot (260 m) platform and 38 special trains from surrounding towns and cities. An explosion from Hall 42 killed 35 workers and mutilated many more. Mechanic Mr William Parking was presented with an engraved silver watch for his bravery in saving factory workers during the incident.

==== Leeds Pals ====
During the First World War, regiments were made up of men from particular towns, meaning that if one regiment suffered heavy losses, a town or city would suffer heavy losses of its male population. Leeds was one city unfortunate enough to suffer this. By the Second World War, regiments weren't so geographically based. The battalion formed in 1914 and suffered its worse losses in the Battle of the Somme in 1916.

==== Conscientious Objectors ====
There were cases of conscientious objection in Leeds: a 1916 newspaper article reported 173 claims for expemption, of which '118 were on contentious grounds'. It was noted that of these objectors, 'a large number stated that they were International Socialists'.

=== Inter-war ===
During the period between the two world wars, the Leeds Women Citizens League was active in advocating what women's needs for housing were to the national Women's Housing Sub-Committee. This was a parliamentary committee which was established in 1918 by the Ministry of Reconstruction in order discover what a woman's view on post-war housing would look life. Recommendations for the Leeds branch of the league included 'porcelain sinks with plugs' that children could be washed in, as well as 'an upstairs'.

=== Second World War ===
During the Second World War Leeds made a further contribution to the war effort, although it was perhaps less historically notable than that of the first. Although the result of the sinking of the third Royal naval vessel named 'Ark Royal' which was Leeds's adopted ship the people of Leeds raised over £9 million in 1942 for a new ship, surpassing the £5 million target.

==== Bombing ====
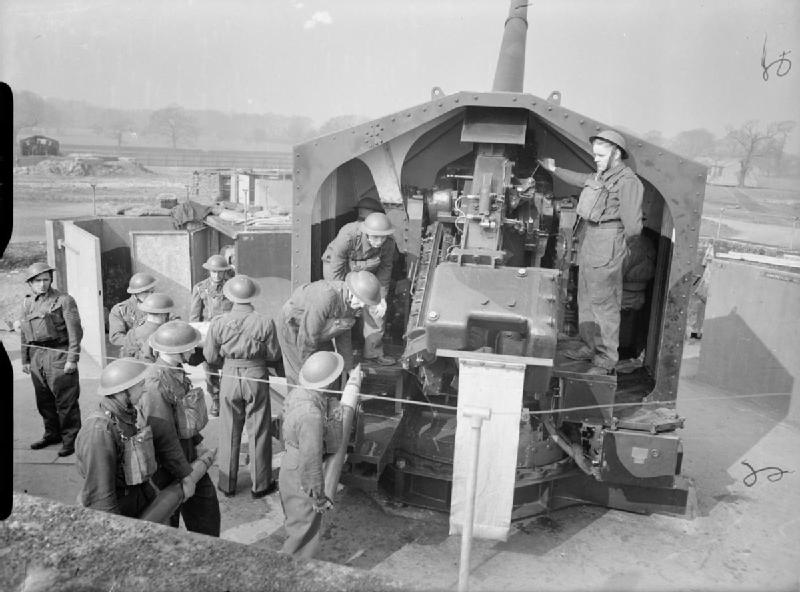
Anti-aircraft guns in Leeds in 1941

Leeds escaped the worst of The Blitz, due mainly to its inland location and lack of any significant industrial targets. On the night of the 14 March and early hours of 15 March 1941, Leeds received its worst night of Luftwaffe bombing. Beeston had more bombs dropped on it than any other district of the city, yet escaped with the least damage. Flaxton Terrace was the only street to be damaged during the night-time blackout air raid, with nearly all the other bombs landing on Cross Flatts Park. In his 2005 poem 'Shrapnel', poet Tony Harrison, who was in Beeston on the night of the raid, speculates whether this was an act of heroism by the Luftwaffe pilot, a theory that has been explored ever since the raid.

Significant damage was also caused in Holbeck and Headingley, while the Eastern side of the Town Hall was damaged. Bombs were also dropped on the Woodhouse area during nighttime air raids, as the Luftwaffe attempted to destroy an industrial target.

==== Thorp Arch ====
ROF Thorp Arch was the main munitions factory in the area at this time. The facility which is now a trading estate and retail park, was situated near Wetherby and like Barnbow featured significant railway facilities. The works suffered minor damage from bombing raids. People from all over West Yorkshire travelled to work at the facility by train from Leeds and Wetherby stations.

==== Yeadon ====
The town of Yeadon housed the underground factory that manufactured the parts for Avro Lancaster bombers. The factory was located alongside the current Leeds Bradford Airport.

==== Rodley ====
Rodley to the west had two factories, Smiths and Booths, that manufactured cranes and had been converted to make bombs.

== Modern history ==
By the 20th century this social and economic had started to change with the creation of the academic institutions that are known today as the University of Leeds and Leeds Beckett University. This period had also witnessed expansion in medical provision, particularly Leeds General Infirmary and St James's Hospital. Following the Second World War there has been, as in many other cities, a decline in secondary industries that thrived in the 19th century.

However, this decline was reversed in the growth of new tertiary industries such as finance, retail, call centres, offices and media. Today Leeds is known as one of eight core cities that act as a focus of their respective regions and Leeds is generally regarded as the dominant city of the ceremonial county of West Yorkshire.

== See also ==
- Thoresby Society - The Leeds History Society
- List of riots in Leeds
- History of Hunslet
- History of Seacroft
- History of Wetherby
- List of hoards in Britain
- Britain's Secret Treasures

== Notes ==
- Much of this article was based upon excerpts from "The Story of English Towns – Leeds", by J. S. Fletcher, published by the Society for Promoting Christian Knowledge, 1919.
