= Lying (disambiguation) =

Lying is the practice of telling lies, or deliberate untruths.

Lying may also refer to:

- Lying (position), a human horizontal position
- Lying (Bok book), a 1978 book by Sissela Bok
- Lying (Harris book), a 2011 book by Sam Harris
- Lying (film), a 2006 American film
- "Lying" (Amy Meredith song), 2010
- Lying (Dan + Shay song), 2021
- "Lying", a song by Jess Glynne from her album Jess (2024)
- "Lying", a song by Lil Baby and Lil Durk from The Voice of the Heroes, 2021
- "Lying", a song by Peter Frampton from Premonition, 1986
- "Lying", a song by PrettyMuch, 2019

== See also ==
- Lied (disambiguation)
- Lying in (disambiguation)
