= The Leeds =

The Leeds may refer to:

- Leeds Permanent Building Society
- Leeds International Piano Competition

== See also ==
- Leeds (disambiguation)
