= Specialist doctor =

Specialist doctor may refer to:

- Specialist, Associate Specialist and Specialty Doctors, a type of career non-training grade doctor in the United Kingdom
- A doctor who works in a specific medical specialty
