= T&M (disambiguation) =

T&M may refer to:

- The British waterway Trent and Mersey Canal
- Time & Material: Time and materials
- Former British manufacturer of prefabricated buildings Teesdale and Metcalf

== See also ==
- For TM (without the "&") see TM (disambiguation)
