= History of Hunslet =

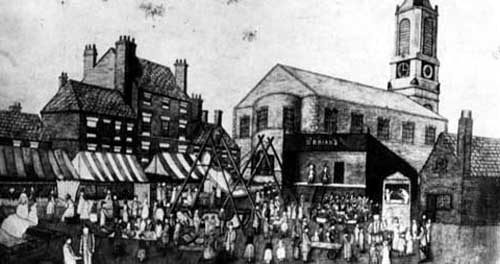
The Hunslet Feast of 1850

Ever since its early days Hunslet has been the 'Workshop of Leeds'. Although from the Industrial Revolution onwards there have been other areas in Leeds to have a large industrial base, such as Holbeck, Armley, Kirkstall and Harehills, none so much as Hunslet. Like neighbouring Holbeck, Hunslet benefited from its close proximity with the River Aire, Leeds city centre, coal mining communities to the south, extensive railways and some of Leeds' best infrastructure. From the 1960s onwards the motorways would also drive industry and commerce in Hunslet.

Hunslet grew from an unremarkable area at the beginning of the Industrial Revolution to a major industrial area only a few years later. The growing industries in Hunslet were not the textile industries, for which Leeds was becoming best known, but generally heavier industries such as steel and iron foundries, engine works and railway works.

== 1906 ==
By 1906, Hunslet was home to Leeds’ second largest gas works, the city's main rail goods yards, known at the time as ‘Midland Goods Station’ (now the site of Crown Point Retail Park), as well as a large number of factories, below is a rough inventory of the major industrial premises in Hunslet at the time.

- Joshua Tetley and Son's Brewery - South Brook Street/ Crown Point Lane
- Sun Foundry - Dewsbury Road
- Potterdale Mill - Dewsbury Road
- Well House Foundry - Dewsbury Road
- Oil Works - Dewsbury Road
- Malthouse and Maltkiln- Dewsbury Road
- Railway Works - Butterley Street
- Printing Works - Butterley Street
- Union Mills - Holmes Street
- Leeds Corporation Refuse Destructor - Kidacre Street
- Malthouse - Gold Street
- Stafford Pottery (disused) - Leathley Road
- Crown Point Printing Works - Hunslet Road
- Boyne Engine Works - Jack Lane
- Hunslet Engine Works - Jack Lane/Cancel Street
- Steam Plough and Locomotive Works - Hunslet Road/ Leathley Road
- Airedale Foundry (Iron and Steel) - Hunslet Road/ Grape Street/ Pearson Street
- Railway Foundry (Iron) - Jack Lane
- Midland Engine Works - Jack Lane
- St Helen's Mills - Whitehouse Street
- Brush Works - Glasshouse Street
- Larchfield Engineering Works - Hunslet Road
- Larchfield Woollen Mills - Pym Street
- Hunslet Glass Works - South Accommodation Road
- Goodman Street Works (Iron and Steel) - Goodman Street
- Lock Works - South Accommodation Road
- Aire Bank Mills - South Accommodation Road
- Airedale Chemical Manure Works - Clarence Road
- Dolphin Foundry (Iron) - Sayner Road
- Hunslet Nail Works - Atkinson Street
- Victoria Mills - Goodman Street
- Hunslet Linen Works - Goodman Street
- Nevin's Foundry - Goodman Street
- Malthouse - Larchfield Road
- Progress Works (Mineral Water) - Stafford Street
- Albert Tool Works - Donisthorpe Street
- Yorkshire Steel Foundry - Black Bull Street
- Victoria Chemical Works - Clarence Road
- Providence Works - Cudbear Street
- Saw Mills - Cudbear Street
- Iron Works - Crown Point Road
- Union Foundry (Iron) - Brookefield Street
- Airedale Works - Albury Road
- Globe Mills (Cabinet Works) - Chadwick Street
- New Dock Wagon Works - Black Bull Street
- Bowman Lane Dye Works - Crown Point Road
- Leather Works - Hunslet Lane

Hunslet was home to Leeds' second largest gasworks, the site had a large column guided gasholder, which was replaced in the 1960s by two spiral guided gasholders (which still stand). The site no longer produces town gas, storing natural gas instead.

== 1960s ==
In 1968, a widespread slum clearance project led to the construction of the Hunslet Grange Flats, also informally known as the Leek Street Flats. The 2,500 flats were commissioned by Leeds City Council and constructed by Shepherd Building Group. The flats were built as a large complex, sprawling over much of Hunslet. While the flats enjoyed a degree of popularity in their first few years, this did not last, the layout of the complex and severe condensation lead to them being attributed to many health and social problems in the area, and only 13 years after construction began, in 1983, the council began to demolish the complex.

The 1960s also saw the M1 motorway come to Hunslet. Since the rerouting of the M1 around the east of Leeds, taking it to the A1(M) motorway at Aberford, the Hunslet stretch of the former M1 is now part of the M621.

== 1980s ==
Following the demolition of Hunslet Grange, the area was again redeveloped with low rise council housing in the early 1990s.

== 2000s ==
The 2000s saw the redevelopment of the former industrial area surrounding Clarence Dock.

== Future ==
The proposed HS2 railway line will run through Hunslet adjacent to the Leeds to Pontefract railway line on a new viaduct. It was at one time planned to terminate at Leeds New Lane station to the west of Hunslet, but will now terminate at Leeds station. In the 2020s, Holbeck is part of the Leeds South Bank development.

== See also ==
- History of Leeds
- History of Seacroft
- History of Wetherby
