= Leeds (disambiguation) =

Leeds is a major town in West Yorkshire, England.

Leeds may also refer to:

== Business ==
- Leeds City Credit Union, a savings and loans co-operative
- Leeds TV, formerly Made in Leeds, television station

== Peerages ==
- Baron Milner of Leeds
- Duke of Leeds
- Leeds baronets

== Places ==
=== Canada ===
- Leeds (federal electoral district), Ontario
- Leeds (Province of Canada electoral district), Ontario
- Leeds (provincial electoral district), Ontario
- Leeds and the Thousand Islands, township in Ontario
- Leeds County, Ontario, historic county
  - United Counties of Leeds and Grenville
- Saint-Jacques-de-Leeds, Quebec

=== England ===
==== West Yorkshire ====
- Leeds city centre, the core inner portion of the settlement
- City of Leeds, local government district created 1974
- Leeds City Region, the area whose economic development is supported by the Leeds City Region Partnership, a sub-regional economic development partnership

===== Historical entities =====
- Leeds manorial borough (1207–1626), within Leeds manor, within Leeds parish
- Leeds (incorporated borough) (1626–1836)
- Leeds Municipal Borough (1836–1889)
- County Borough of Leeds (1889–1974)
- Leeds (UK Parliament constituency) (1832–1885)
- Leeds (European Parliament constituency) (1979–1999)

==== Kent ====
- Leeds, Kent, a village near Maidstone
  - Leeds Castle, a castle near Leeds, Kent
  - Leeds Priory, a priory near Leeds, Kent

=== United States ===
- Leeds, Alabama, a city
- Leeds, Maine, a town
- Leeds, Massachusetts, a village within Northampton, Massachusetts
- Leeds Township, Murray County, Minnesota, a township
- Leeds, Kansas City, a neighborhood of Kansas City, Missouri
- Leeds, New York, a hamlet
- Leeds, North Dakota, a city
- Leeds Township, Benson County, North Dakota
- Leeds, Utah, a town
- Leeds, Wisconsin, a town
  - Leeds (community), Wisconsin, an unincorporated community
  - Leeds Center, Wisconsin, an unincorporated community

== Schools ==
=== England ===
- University of Leeds
- Leeds Beckett University, formerly Leeds Metropolitan University and Leeds Polytechnic
- Leeds Trinity University, Horsforth, West Yorkshire
- Leeds Arts University, formerly Leeds College of Art
- Leeds College of Music
- Leeds College of Technology
- Leeds City College
- Leeds College of Building

=== United States ===
- Leeds School of Business, Boulder, Colorado, United States

== Sports ==
- Leeds Carnegie, sports teams associated with the Carnegie School of Physical Education
- Leeds City F.C., a 1904–19 football club
- Leeds City Vixens L.F.C., now Guiseley A.F.C. Vixens, a women's football club
- Leeds Rhinos, a rugby league club
- Leeds Road, a former football stadium in Huddersfield, England
- Leeds Tykes, a rugby union club
- Leeds United F.C., a football club
- Leeds United L.F.C., a football club

== Other uses ==
- Leeds (surname) (including a list of people bearing the surname)
- Leeds railway station, the central station in Leeds city centre
- HM Prison Leeds, a prison in Armley, Leeds, West Yorkshire, England
- "Leeds" (The Architecture the Railways Built), a 2023 television episode
- "Leeds", a song by the Indigo Girls from Shaming of the Sun

== See also ==
- Jersey Devil or Leeds Devil, a legendary creature said to inhabit southern New Jersey, US
- LEED (disambiguation)
- Leeds Building Society, previously Leeds and Holbeck Building Society
- Leeds Permanent Building Society, since 1995 part of the Halifax
- Leeds Talk-o-Phone, a record label
- Live at Leeds (disambiguation)
- Saint-Jacques-de-Leeds, Quebec, municipality in Quebec
