= Lied (disambiguation) =

Lied or Lieder may refer to:

- Lied, the German word for "song", usually used for the setting of romantic German poems to music
- Past tense and past participle of lie, a deliberate untruth

== People ==
- Finn Lied (1916–2014), Norwegian military researcher and politician
- Harald U. Lied (1927–2002), Norwegian politician
- Bernard Lieder (1923–2020), American politician

== Places ==
- Lied Bluff, a rocky hill near Club Lake in the north-central part of Breidnes Peninsula in the Vestfold Hills of Antarctica
- Lied Center for Performing Arts, a performing arts facility in Lincoln, Nebraska, opened 1990
- Lied Discovery Children's Museum, in Las Vegas
- Lied Glacier, a glacier close north of Cape Arkona on the southwest side of Heard Island in the southern Indian Ocean
- Lied Jungle, a large rainforest exhibit in the Henry Doorly Zoo and Aquarium in Omaha, Nebraska
- Lied Library, in the University of Nevada, Las Vegas campus in Paradise, Nevada

== Music ==
- Lieder, album by Adel Tawil

== See also ==
- Lie (disambiguation)
- Lying (disambiguation)
