= LED (disambiguation) =

LED, or light-emitting diode, is a solid-state semiconductor light source.

LED or led may also refer to:

- LED (editor), a programmers' editor by Norsk Data
- Led (river), a river in northern Russia
- L.E.D., the former stage name of Skydiver Elley Duhé
- Large extra dimensions, a theory in physics
- Lewis electron dot structure, a diagram tracking valence electrons
- Local economic development, an approach to development, particularly in the Third World
- Leading edge devices, the part of the wing that contacts the air first
- Locally-employed doctor, a grade of medical practitioner in the United Kingdom
- Lendu language (ISO 639-3 code: led)
- Pulkovo Airport, Russia (IATA code: LED)
- Ledbury railway station, England (National Rail code: LED)

== See also ==
- L. Ed., an unofficial reporter of Supreme Court of the U.S. opinions
- Lead, a chemical element
- Led Zeppelin, an English rock band (1968–1980)
