= Leeds (surname) =

Leeds is a surname of English origin. It is likely derived from the city of Leeds in West Yorkshire or the village of Leeds in Kent.

Notable people with the surname include:

- Alan Leeds (born 1947), American music executive
- Alfred Nicholson Leeds (1847–1917), English amateur paleontologist
- Andrea Leeds (1914–1984), American film actor
- Andrew Leeds (rugby) (born 1964), Australian rugby footballer
- Andrew Leeds (actor)
- Anthony Leeds (1925–1989), American anthropologist
- Billy Leeds (1880–1955), Australian rules footballer
- Charles J. Leeds, American politician, Mayor of New Orleans 1874–76
- Doug Leeds (born 1968), American businessman
- Douglas B. Leeds (1947–2011), American businessman
- Edward Leeds (priest) (died 1590), English clergyman
- Edward Thurlow Leeds (1877–1955), English archaeologist, Keeper of the Ashmolean Museum 1928–45
- Eric Leeds (born 1952), American musician
- Herbert I. Leeds (1900–1954), American film director
- Herbert Leeds (1855–1930), American amateur golfer and golf course architect
- Joanie Leeds (born 1978), American musician
- Lila Leeds (1928–1999), American film actor
- Morris E. Leeds (1869–1952), American electrical engineer
- Peter Leeds (1917–1996), American actor
- Phil Leeds (1916–1998), American film actor
- Sara Leeds (born 1994/1995), American TikToker
- Stacy Leeds (born 1971), American law professor
- Thelma Leeds (1910–2006), American actor
- Titan Leeds (1699–1738), American almanac publisher

== Fictional characters ==
- Ned Leeds, comic book character
- James Leeds, central character in the film Children of a Lesser God

== See also ==
- which may include people not yet added to the list above
- Leeds (disambiguation)
