= Leed (disambiguation) =

Leed is a former soft drink.

LEED is Leadership in Energy and Environmental Design, a standard for green building design.

Leed or LEED may also refer to:

- Leed Publishing, a Japanese company
- Rick Leed (1955–2017), American television and film producer
- Melveen Leed (born 1943), Hawaiian singer

== Acronyms ==
- Low-energy electron diffraction, a characterization technique in crystallography

== See also ==
- Leeds (disambiguation)
- Lead (disambiguation)
