= Lying in =

Lying in may refer to:

- Lying-in, a European term for lengthy bedrest after childbirth
- Lying in repose, the process of displaying a deceased person
- Lying in state, the process of displaying a coffin
