= Lead (disambiguation) =

Lead is a chemical element with symbol Pb and atomic number 82.

Lead or The Lead may also refer to:

== Animal handling ==
- Leash, or lead
- Lead (leg), the leg that advances most in a quadruped's cantering or galloping stride
- Lead (tack), a line used to lead a horse

== Arts, entertainment, and media ==
=== Journalism ===
- Lead (news), the leading news story or leading part of a news story
- Lead, information from a source that leads to the uncovering of more interesting information
- Lead paragraph, the opening paragraph of an article

=== Music ===
Concepts

- Lead sheet, a musical score describing the essential elements of a song
- Lead, type of voice, or patch, in synthesizer
- Lead instrument
- Lead vocalist
- Guitar solo, a solo performed by the lead guitar

Other

- Lead (band), a Japanese hip-hop group
- "Lead", a song by Matt Brouwer from Imagerical
- The Lead (EP), an extended play by British girl group FLO

=== Performance ===
- Leading actor
- Lead and follow, the direction or guidance one dance partner communicates to the other

=== Television ===
- The Lead, a 2017 Singaporean television series
- The Lead with Jake Tapper, an American news program

== Marketing and sales ==
- Pay per lead, a method of marketing
- Sales lead, a potential customer

== Places ==
- Lead, North Yorkshire, England
- Lead, South Dakota, a city in the United States

== Sports ==
- Lead (curling), a curling position
- Lead climbing
- Lead off, in baseball, a baserunner's position from the base he occupies
- Several meanings in card games; see Glossary of card game terms#L

== Substances ==
- Lead compound, a chemical compound in drug discovery (/liːd/, not the metal lead)
- Type metal, a lead alloy used in typesetting
- Tetraethyllead, a gasoline additive
- Pencil lead, the graphite writing core of a pencil

== Other uses ==
- Honda Lead, a model of scooter
- Lead, in international finance, expediting payment to take advantage of an expected change in exchange rates; see Leads and lags
- Lead, in project management, the amount of time to start an activity before a successor activity is finished, in project management
- LEAD (diode), a light-emitting and -absorbing diode
- Lead (electronics), a metallic wire for electrical devices and equipment
- Lead (engineering), the axial advance of a helix or screw during one complete turn (360°)
- Lead (geology), a subsurface feature with the potential to have entrapped oil or gas
- Lead (sea ice), a temporary stretch of open water in pack ice
- Sounding lead or sounding line, a line used to measure water depth
- Bullets, metonymically
- Valve lead, piston engine timing parameter

== See also ==
- Compounds of lead
- Lead–lag compensator, a component in a control system
- Leading (disambiguation)
- LED (disambiguation)
- Lede (disambiguation)
