= Yorkshire Trades Union =

- Founded: 1831
- Dissolved: 1834
- Location: England
- Members: 20,000 (1832)
- Key people: Simeon Pollard (Gen Sec)

The Yorkshire Trades Union, also known as the Leeds Trade Union, or the Leeds, Bradford and Huddersfield District Union, was an early trade union in England.

The union was established in 1831 by a wide variety of local societies, in support of a strike at Gotts Woollen Mill in Leeds. The most important society was the Leeds Clothiers Union, and its leader, Simeon Pollard, became the Yorkshire Trades Union's secretary.

The various societies comprising the union each had their own initiation ceremonies, and they required members to take a vow of secrecy.

Initially, the union grew quickly, having 20,000 members by October 1832, including some in other counties. However, the majority of members worked in making textiles from wool or worsted, and it was in these trades that it repeatedly took industrial action against employers who tried to force workers to sign agreements not to join a union.

The union collapsed in 1834, although many of its constituent societies remained active.
