= Lied Bluff =

Lied Bluff (68°31′S 78°16′E) is a rocky hill 1.5 nautical miles (3 km) north of Club Lake in the north-central part of Breidnes Peninsula, in the Vestfold Hills of Antarctica. The hill is 125 metres (410 ft) high and its southern face is almost perpendicular. It was mapped by Norwegian cartographers from air photos taken by the Lars Christensen Expedition (1936–37), and first visited by an Australian National Antarctic Research Expeditions sledge party led by B.H. Stinear in 1958. The hill was named by the Antarctic Names Committee of Australia for Nils Lied, a weather observer at Davis Station in 1957.
