= Lede =

Lede may refer to:

- The first sentence in a news article
- Lead paragraph, the first paragraph of a composition (in US English sometimes lede)

== Places ==
- Lede, Belgium, a municipality in Flanders
- Lède, a river in France
- Lede Formation, a geologic formation in Belgium

== People ==
- Marquess of Lede of Flanders
- Kiana Ledé (born 1997) US musician and actress

== Other uses ==
- LEDE, a Linux distribution of embedded Linux

== See also ==
- Lead (disambiguation)
