= Live at Leeds (disambiguation) =

Live at Leeds is a 1970 live album by British rock group The Who.

Live at Leeds may also refer to:

- Live at Leeds (festival), a music festival that takes place across various venues in Leeds, England on the weekend of the May Day bank holiday
- Live at Leeds (John Martyn album), a 1976 live album by British musician John Martyn
- Live at Leeds (Rolling Stones album), a 2012 live album by The Rolling Stones
- Live at Leeds '71 , a live album by The Groundhogs
- Live from Leeds, a live concert DVD by English folk musician Kate Rusby, released 2003
- Live at Leeds, a 1994 live album by the musical duo Moodswings
