= History of Kirkstall =

Kirkstall is a historically important area of Leeds. Its history can be seen in its abbey, its industrial remains and its regeneration.

== Early history ==
Kirkstall was historically an important centre of industry. Kirkstall Forge lays claim to being the longest continually used industrial site in Britain founded in the 13th century by the Cistercian monks of the abbey, and a number of printers. The earliest known activity on the site was a medieval mill race which supplied water to power the corn mill at Kirkstall Abbey. Iron production took place at the forge from the 1580s onwards.

Kirkstall Abbey, a daughter abbey of Fountains was founded in 1152 by Abbot Alexander. By the time of the Reformation the site covered 800 acres. The abbey buildings took over 75 years to build.

== Reformation ==
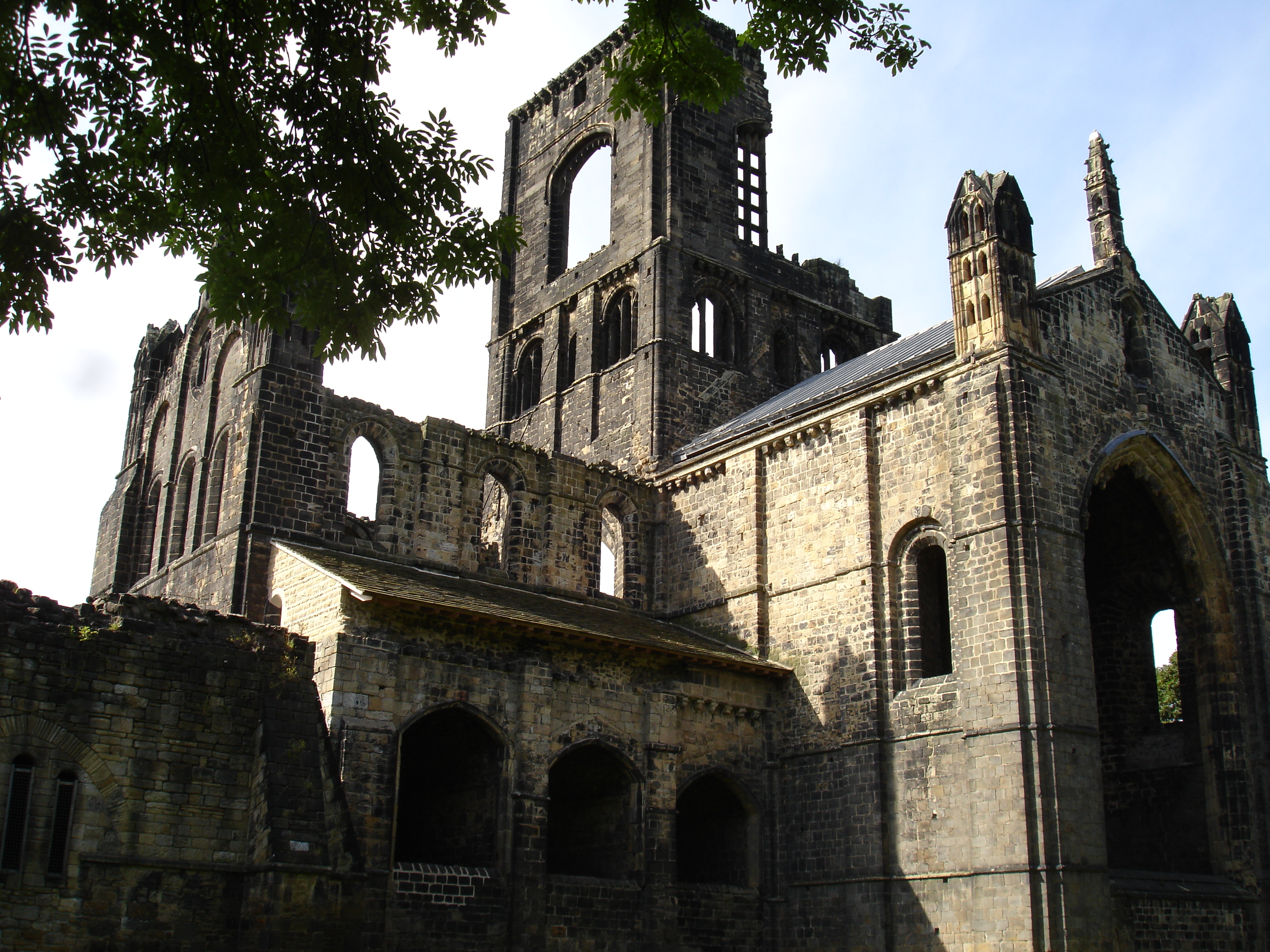
The ruins of Kirkstall Abbey

At the time of the reformation, Kirkstall Abbey covered around 800 acres. The monks in residence produced leather goods, pottery, leadwork as well as being involved in weaving and other forms of metalwork. The Cistercian foundries were well equipped and skilled and it has been likened to a forerunner to the Industrial Revolution.

Under the auspices of the dissolution of the monasteries, Kirkstall Abbey was formerly surrendered on 22 November 1539 by abbot John Ripley. He and 31 monks who gathered in the abbeys chapter house surrendering it to Richard Leyton, a commissioner to Henry VIII.

The abbey was left to ruin and now sits in parkland by the River Aire. The ruins have been painted by artists such as J. M. W. Turner and Thomas Girtin.

== English Civil War ==
During the English Civil War, the bridge over the Aire at Kirkstall (referred to in a contemporaneous account as 'Churchstall') was blown up by Royalist troops from Leeds. After discovering this, a Parliamentary force led by Ferdinando Fairfax, 2nd Lord Fairfax of Cameron – from Otley – had to cross the river upstream at Apperley Bridge before retaking Leeds in January 1643.

== Industrial Revolution ==
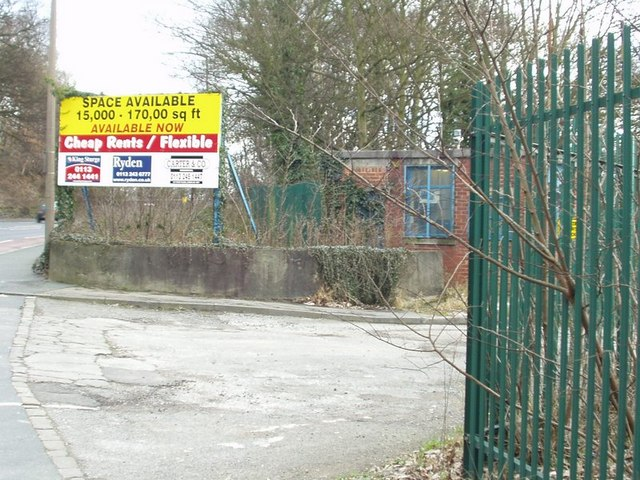
The entrance to the now disused Kirkstall Forge

Kirkstall's position on the River Aire made it a prominent place for industrial development in the early Industrial Revolution. A water power system was constructed on the River Aire below Kirkstall Abbey between 1760 and 1860; remains of this can still be seen today.

Construction of the Leeds and Liverpool Canal began in 1770, bringing greater transport links to Kirkstall, further increasing its attractiveness to industry. An array of industries developed including brewing, printing, textiles and iron forging.

Railway lines later opened to both the east and west of Kirkstall.

St. Ann's Mill, a mill manufacturing cashmere, opened in 1822 while J.E. Brooke, a woollen mill, opened in 1830.

Kirkstall's brewery was first registered in 1871 and its original building remains, albeit as student flats (the current brewery operates from premises nearby).

Kirkstall Forge continued to grow throughout this period. During the late 18th century, the reconstruction of the upper and lower forges allowed 'shovel and spade production' to commence. A railway was built at the forge in 1830 and sustained growth at the plant.

== 20th century ==
The First World War brought about large scale growth, providing axles for military vehicles and by 1930 most lorries and buses made in the UK had a Kirkstall back axle casing. In 2002 the owners of the site, the Dana announced the closure of the works, shifting production to India and Spain. The site is undergoing major redevelopment, as is the old Waide's Printers & Kwik Save site. Printing has, like iron-founding, suffered a decline, several printing companies remain. Until the late 1970s when it was closed, Kirkstall was dominated by a coal fired power station. It was replaced by larger power stations away from town at Ferrybridge, Eggborough and Drax. The power station was demolished in the early 1980s.

== Regeneration ==
The regeneration of Kirkstall and the surrounding valley began in the 1980s and continues today.

=== Past ===
The Kirkstall Valley and (in nearby Burley) Cardigan Fields retail parks was born out of an attempt to regenerate Kirkstall beginning in the 1980s. Much of the proposed regenerations never took place and many were held in contempt by residents such as the initially proposed 'dinosaur theme park'. Other features never to be built include a marina, shopping centres (although similar developments were built) and office developments

The nature of the Kirkstall area has often stalled development plans; with the area being divided by a railway, the River Aire and the Leeds Liverpool Canal, as well as the existence of a number of high-voltage power lines have presented developers with challenges not present at other sites.

=== Current ===
Currently the redevelopment of Kirkstall Forge which closed in 2002 involves the building of residential and commercial premises as well as the opening of Kirkstall Forge railway station. The redeveloped Kirkstall Forge will include over 1,000 new homes of varying types, as well as 150,000 square feet of space for offices and amenities. A hotel will also be built on site. This scheme is cited to create 3,000 new jobs.

The commercial centre of Kirkstall is somewhat dilapidated and it has been proposed by Tesco to redevelop this area. A supermarket, other shops and new premises for the Leeds Postal Workers Sports Association club are included in the plans. The former Kirkstall Lites pub and Kirkstall Liberal Club will be demolished along with the existing shopping centre.

A new park in the Kirkstall Valley has also been proposed.

The current regeneration of Kirkstall is laid down in the Aire Valley Action Plan.
