= Locally-employed doctor =

Grade of doctor not in specialty training in the UK

A locally-employed doctor (LED), also known as a trust doctor or trust-grade doctor, trust SHO, or clinical fellow is a doctor in the United Kingdom appointed to a non-training post in the National Health Service that is not nationally recognised, where their employment conditions are dictated by the local NHS trust as opposed to the national contracts on which other doctors are employed. The posts are, by their local nature, highly variable but generally only require doctors to have completed their foundation doctor post, as opposed to the nationally-recognised SAS grade posts which require some post-graduate experience in the relevant specialty. Some trusts may offer some specialty training to LEDs in order for them to progress to a SAS grade post, but this is optional and availability will depend on the trust. The British Medical Association has raised concerns that some LED posts may be undermining working conditions or pay for applicants unfairly in comparison to doctors in nationally-recognised posts. A 2005 survey by the BMA showed that many of the doctors accepting Trust Doctor posts are from overseas who may settle for these posts despite having adequate qualifications, leading to concerns of exploitation.
