= Sara Leeds =

American social media influencer (born 1994/1995)

- Born: 1994 or 1995 (age 31–32); New York, U.S.
- Occupation: Social media influencer

Instagram information
- Page: doormanstories
- Followers: 131 thousand

TikTok information
- Page: Doorman Stories
- Years active: 2023–present
- Followers: 95.3 thousand
- Last updated: January 17, 2026

Sara Leeds (born 1994/1995) is an American social media influencer. She is best known for her TikTok series Doorman Stories.

== Life and career ==
Leeds was born in New York, the daughter of a New York University professor.

In January 2023, Leeds began the video series Doorman Stories on TikTok, posting her first video on January 24, 2023, where she interviewed a doorman who shared a story about a sleepwalker who walked down to the lobby naked. After posting numerous doorman interview videos, she gained popularity, interviewing more than 100 doorman and gaining over 5.8 million likes throughout all her videos.
