= Specialist, associate specialist and specialty doctors =

Career-grade non-training NHS doctors

In the United Kingdom, Specialist, Associate Specialist and Specialty Doctors, also known as SAS grade doctors or career grade doctors, are doctors who are appointed to permanent non-training posts in the NHS, as opposed to other doctors who are undergoing specialty training, such as specialty registrars, or consultants who have completed their specialty training. While exact responsibilities differ depending on the particular title, SAS grade doctors generally deliver clinical care as part of a wider team, with less education, administration, and other non-clinical responsibilities compared to consultants or specialty trainees. There are many reasons doctors decide to take up SAS grade posts; while some enter these posts temporarily to gain experience or due to issues acquiring a more traditional training post, other doctors prefer to work permanently as SAS grades due to the posts' more favourable hours, increased control over places of work, or lesser administrative/educational duties when compared to specialty training.

== History ==
The SAS grade was created to incorporate and standardise a number of previously disparate titles, including clinical medical officer, clinical assistant, clinical fellow, hospital practitioner, community medical officer, and other titles created by individual organisations within the NHS to fulfil service requirements, collectively known as locally-employed doctors. These posts have typically been created ad-hoc by organisations to fill gaps in rotas not occupied by resident doctors, and have been considered as low-status positions occupied by doctors who have failed to enter the more traditional training posts. Previously, these posts were often known as non-consultant career grades or middle grades; this has since been discouraged as it was considered demeaning.

The post of associate specialist was introduced in 1981, replacing the previous medical assistant post, open to doctors with at least 10 years of post-graduate experience, with at least 4 of those years being in registrar or staff grade posts, 2 of which must have been in the specialty concerned. This was a senior role in a firm underneath a consultant which delivered well-defined levels of care in order to enhance service delivery and free up consultants to engage in their educational, administrative, and other non-clinical duties.

The aforementioned staff grade post was introduced in 1988, in response to bottlenecks in progression for doctors into specialty training posts. The post was open to any doctor who had completed their foundation doctor posts (or the previous pre-registration house officer post) and worked junior to the existing associate specialist and registrar grades performing more routine clinical tasks.

These two posts formed the majority of career grade posts up until 2008 when, after lobbying from the British Medical Association to standardise the various disparate career grade posts to improve recognition and pay, the NHS created the new specialty doctor post and closed entry to the staff grade post, with entry to the associate specialist post closing 12 months later. Some doctors remain in the previous staff and associate specialist grades, comprising around 3% of the total SAS grade workforce.

== Current roles and responsibilities ==
Specialty doctors are doctors with a minimum of 4 years of postgraduate experience, with at least 2 in the specialty concerned, although many specialty doctors have more than this. There are over 9,000 specialty doctors in the UK and a patient is likely to be seen by one if admitted to the care of a hospital specialist. Most report to a consultant but many have 20 or more years of specialty experience and they are employed on a contract similar to that for consultants. Specialty Doctors usually perform more direct patient care than their consultant colleagues as they are not normally involved in management, yet may have more experience and skills than some of their colleagues in the training grades.

In 2021, the NHS introduced the specialist doctor grade to offer career progression to SAS grade doctors; this followed lobbying by the BMA to properly implement the 'autonomous practitioner' role for SAS grade doctors which had been established by the 2014 SAS Charter, as well as to provide appropriate recognition and pay to senior SAS grade doctors. Specialist doctors must have a minimum of 12 years of postgraduate experience, with at least 6 in the specialty concerned, and can hold clinical responsibilities similar to those of consultants, such as being the responsible named clinician for a patient, serving as an expert decision-maker, and leading multi-disciplinary teams. In addition, they may have more opportunities to take up administrative, educational, and management responsibilities similar to those of consultants.

== Working conditions ==
SAS grade doctors often face extra challenges in their careers compared to doctors on the traditional specialty training route; for example, some doctors in the grade report being overlooked for professional development, further development, and educational opportunities. SAS grade doctors, even when working in the higher specialist grade, are often seen as purely "service providers" and excluded from advanced decision making due to traditional hierarchical attitudes. Despite making up almost a quarter of the workforce and being the fastest-growing grade of doctor, many SAS grade doctors have reported feeling isolated and othered at work, and have struggled to have their full workload recognised.

== See also ==
- Resident doctor (United Kingdom)
- Locally-employed doctor
- Medical education in the United Kingdom
