= Teasdale and Metcalfe =

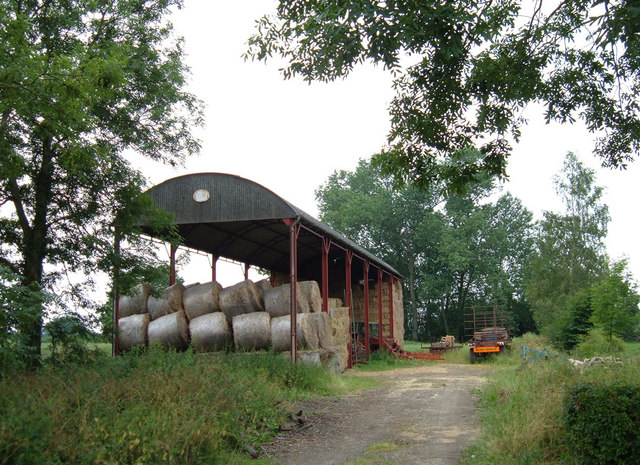
A Teasdale and Metcalf Dutch-barn near Church Fenton in North Yorkshire.

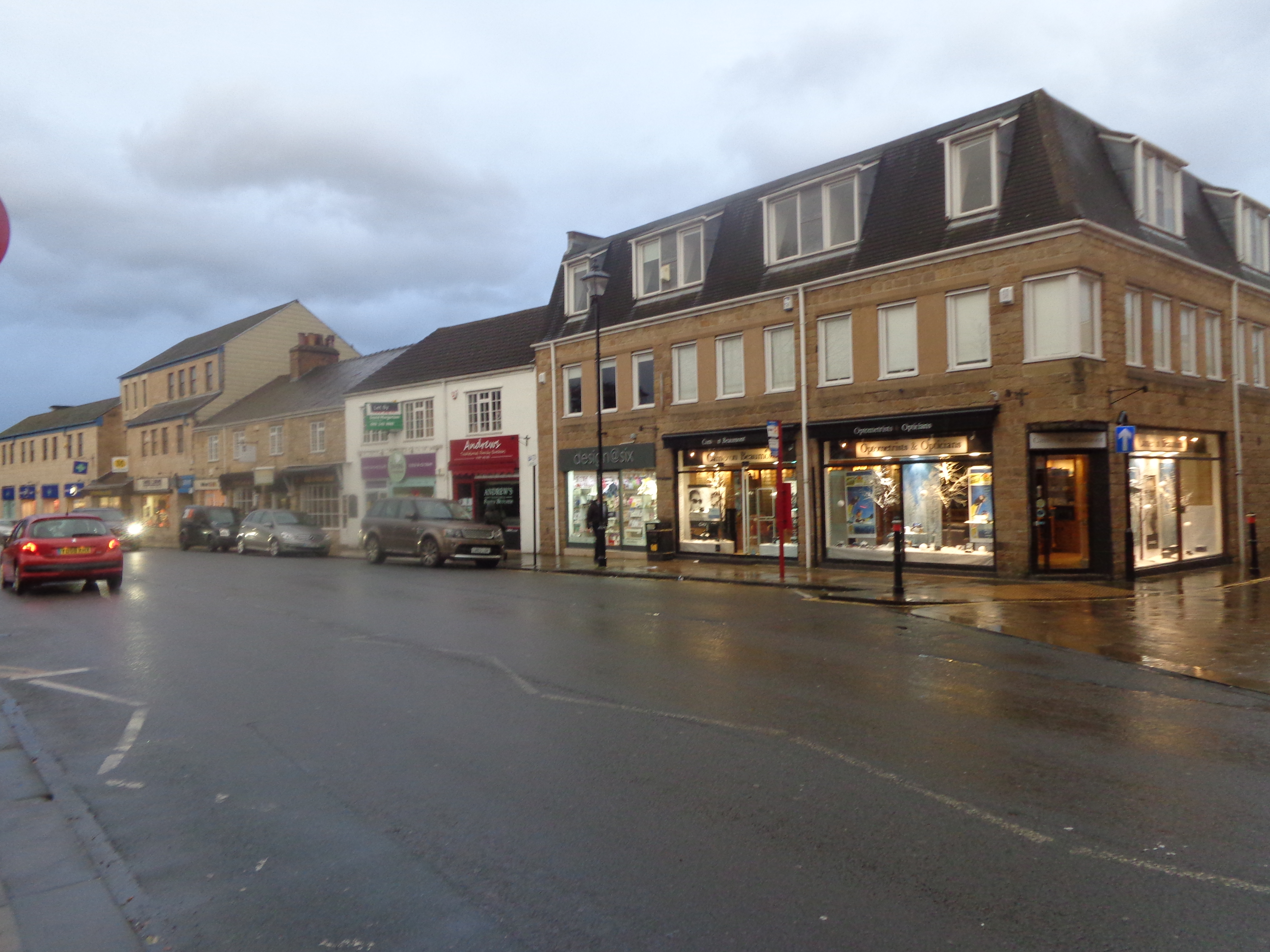
Site of the North Street entrance to the Teasdale and Metcalf works in 2014

Teasdale and Metcalfe was a company based in Wetherby, West Yorkshire, England, who specialised in the manufacturing of prefabricated buildings for industrial and agricultural use. The company had a large works off North Street in Wetherby. In the late 1970s this was developed into the Horsefair Shopping Centre. Teasdale and Metcalfe buildings are recognisable as they carry a red and white oval plaque with the T&M logo on. Prior to manufacturing prefabricated buildings the company were dealers in agricultural equipment.
