= History of Seacroft =

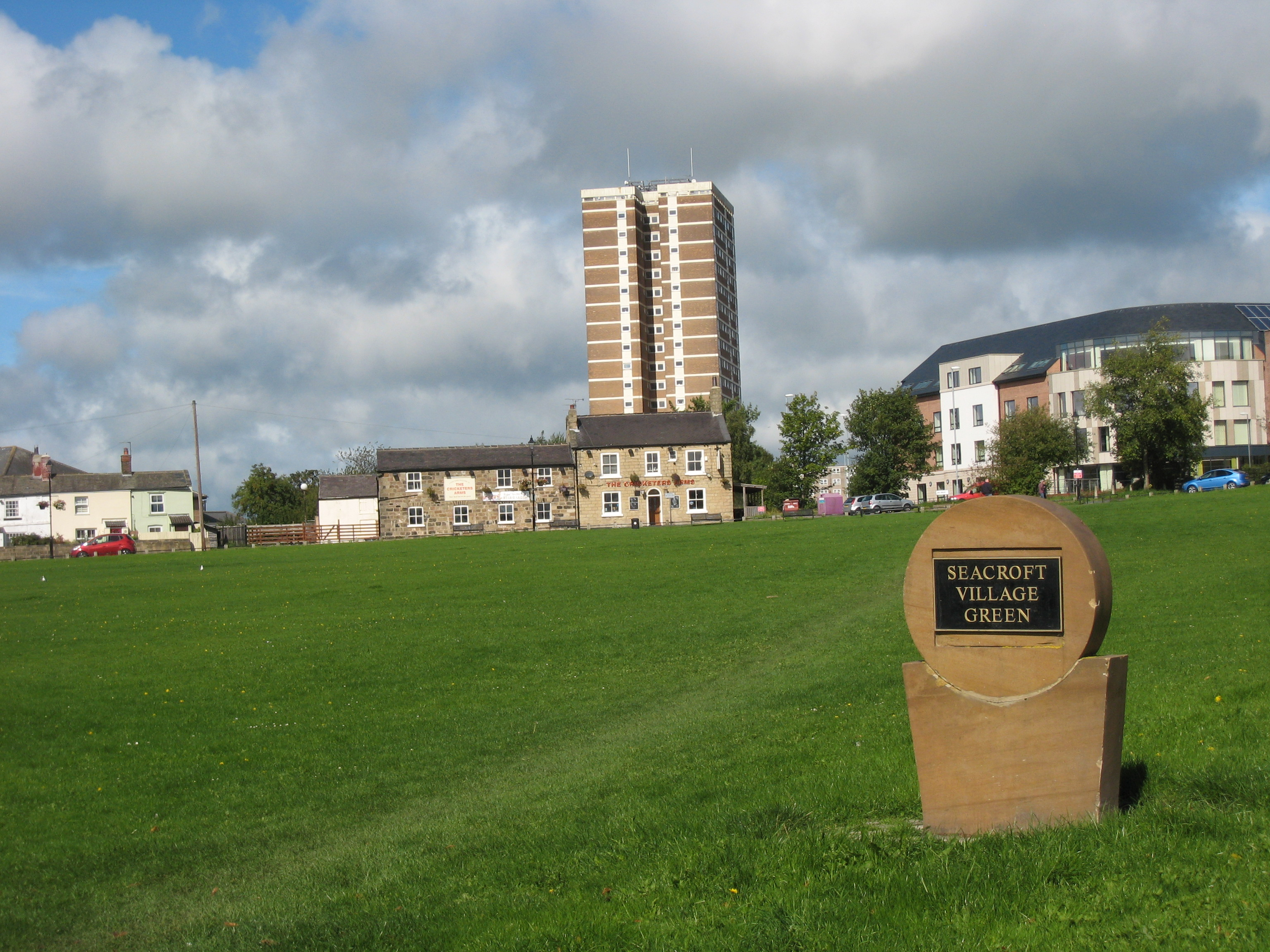
Seacroft Village Green

Seacroft (once a village, now a suburb of Leeds, England) pre-dates the Domesday Book, with evidence of a settlement in the area from the Neolithic age. Seacroft remained largely unchanged for centuries as a small Yorkshire village, until in the 1950s the area was developed into Leeds' largest council estate. In the 1960s and 1970s the building of Whinmoor and Swarcliffe enclosed Seacroft within other suburbs.

== Seacroft Village ==
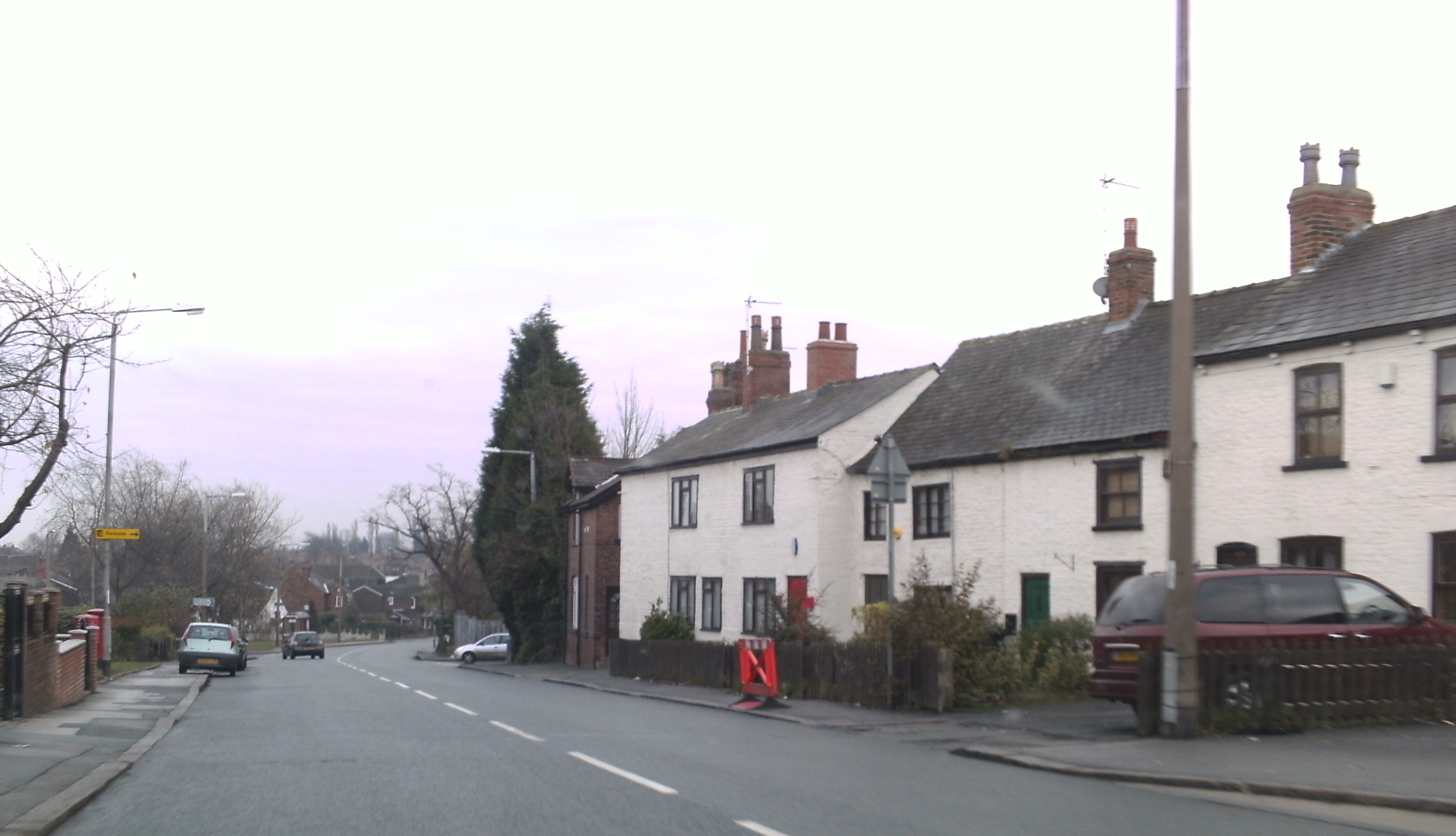
Areas of the original Seacroft village

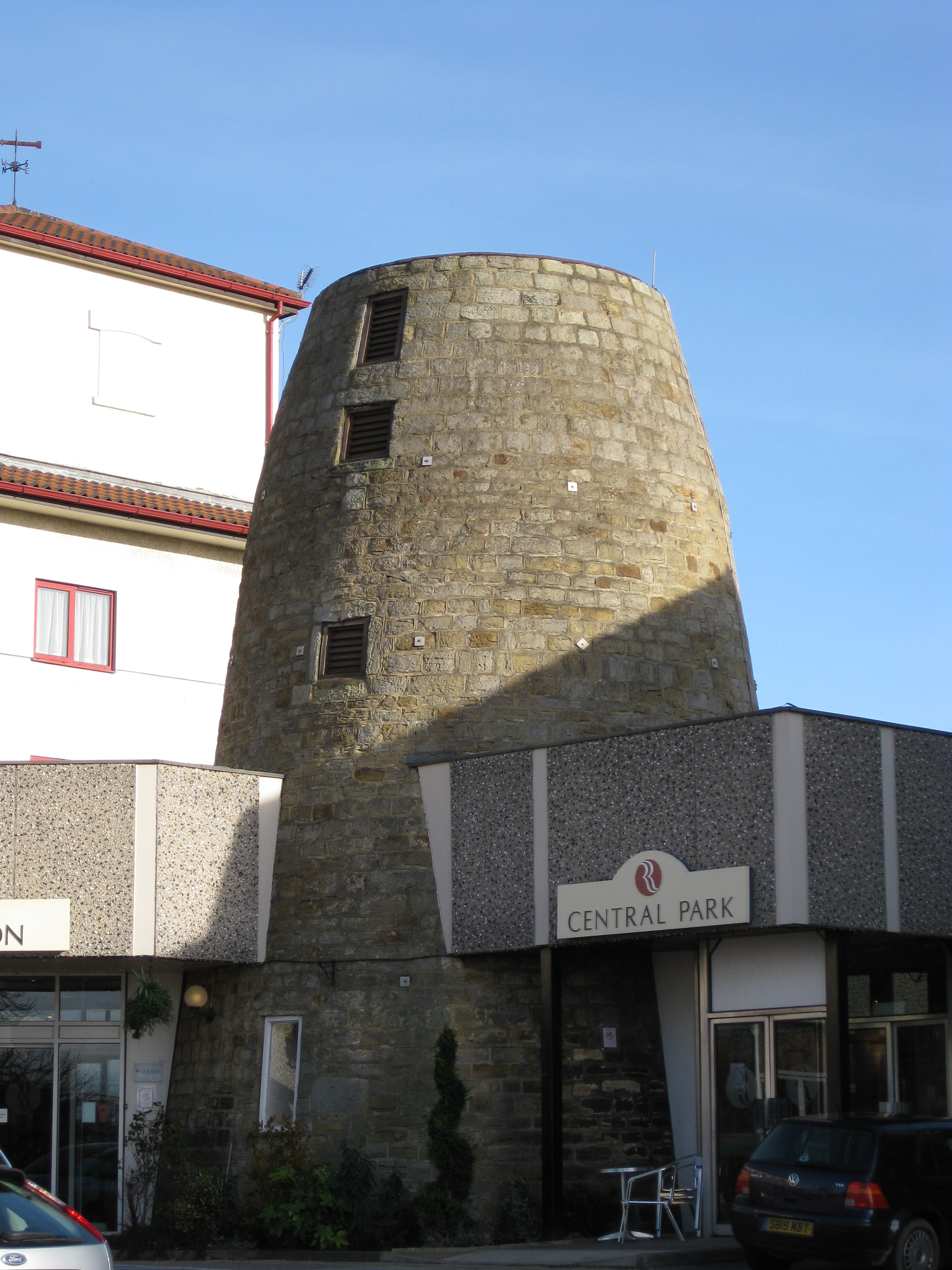
Seacroft Windmill

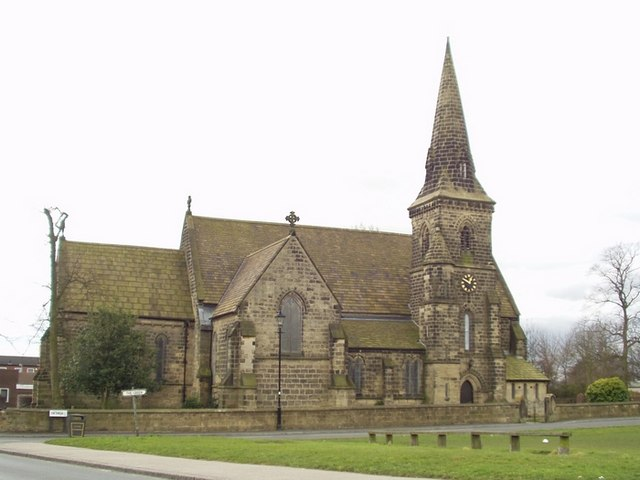
St. James Church, Seacroft

Seacroft has a history dating back beyond the Domesday Book (1086). However, there is evidence of inhabitation prior to that, during construction of the estate in the 1950s, a stone axe dating from the Neolithic age (3500)-(2100)BC was found on Kentmere Avenue, while two silver Roman coins were found on Seacroft Green in the 1850s.

The Venerable Bede records the battle of Winwaed between King Oswy's forces and the, unsuccessful, invading Mercians under King Penda. Bede gives this as taking place near Seacroft on 15 November 655. The name (originally Saecroft) is of Saxon origin - sae meaning pool or lake and croft meaning enclosure or farm.

In 1643 a minor battle between Royalists for Charles I and a small group of Roundheads under Thomas Fairfax, who were en route from Tadcaster to Leeds, took place at Seacroft. Fairfax was obliged to retreat across Bramham moor.

=== Manor of Seacroft ===
Seacroft Village is the original part of Seacroft, around the Green and Cricketers Arms (pictured top), it is often still talked about today. Seacroft Village is mentioned in the Domesday Book. Seacroft Hall was built in the 16th century by the Shiletto family and extensively refurbished in the 17th century and incorporated extensive landscaping and parkland. Despite being a listed building the hall was demolished in the 1950s, the original entrance lodge still stands on York Road with Parklands School on South Parkway now occupying the location of the hall. In 1603 on 26 February, the dependent Manor of Seacroft was granted by King James I to Charles Blount, Earl of Devon. In 1605 the Earl conveyed Seacroft to George Shillito Esq. of Houghton. For the next 200 years the legal dispute, whether the manor of Seacroft had ceased to be subject to the paramount manor of Roundhay, dragged on.

See also The Seacroft Village Preservation Society.

There is an old non-operating windmill, that pre-dates the estate, which has been incorporated into a hotel (now known as the Ramada Leeds North).

Seacroft Village was surrounded by several farms, including the Beechwood Estate and Pigeon Cote Farm which was demolished in 1954 to make way for the building of the estate. The Georgian mansion Beechwood survives, the name Beechwood being chosen for one of the estate's early state schools.

== 1950s and 1960s ==
=== Satellite Town Within The City Boundary ===
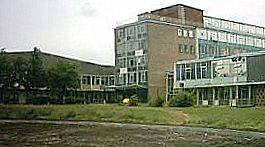
Foxwood School was used for the filming of the Beiderbecke Trilogy.

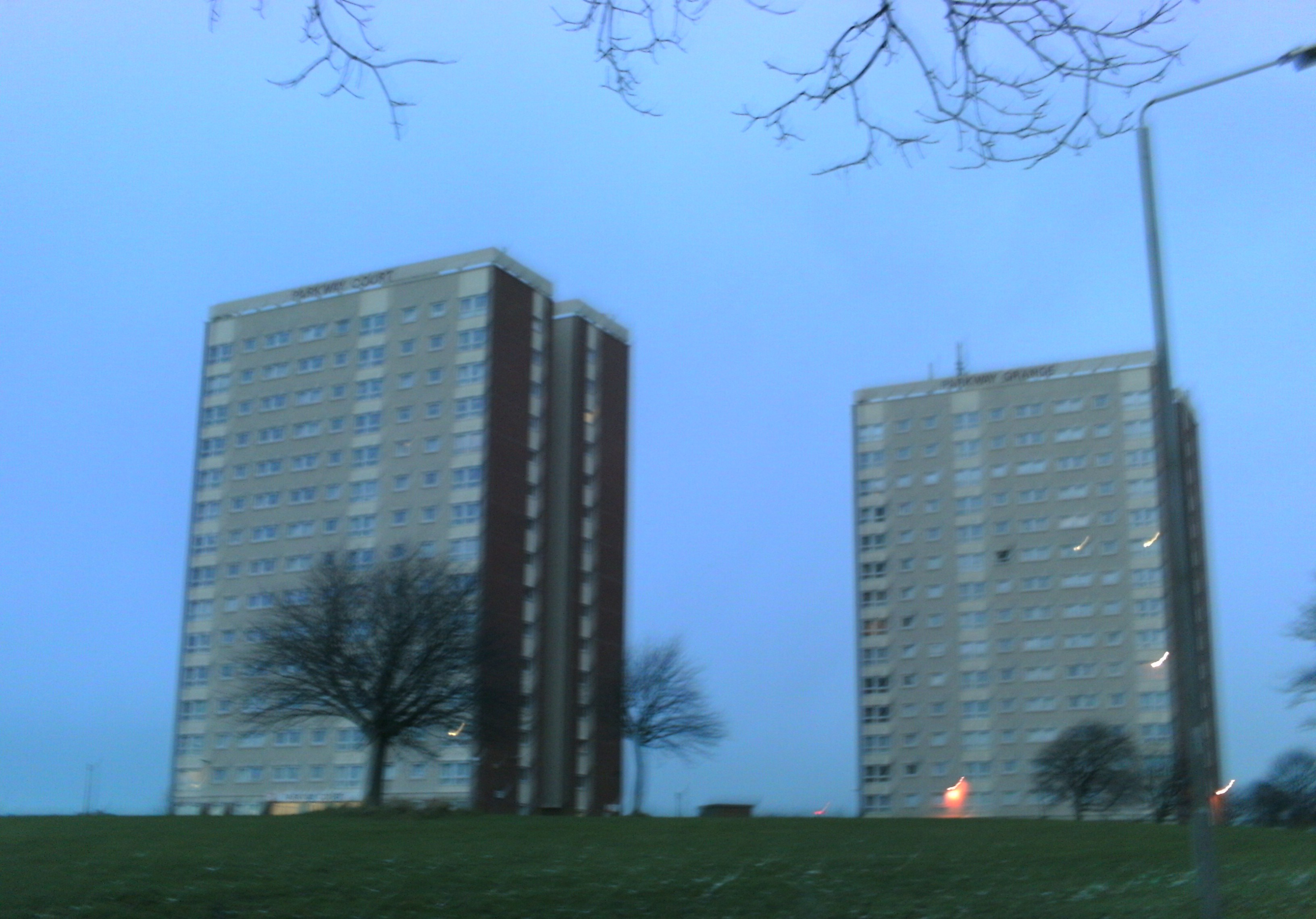
High rise flats along the Southern edge of Seacroft

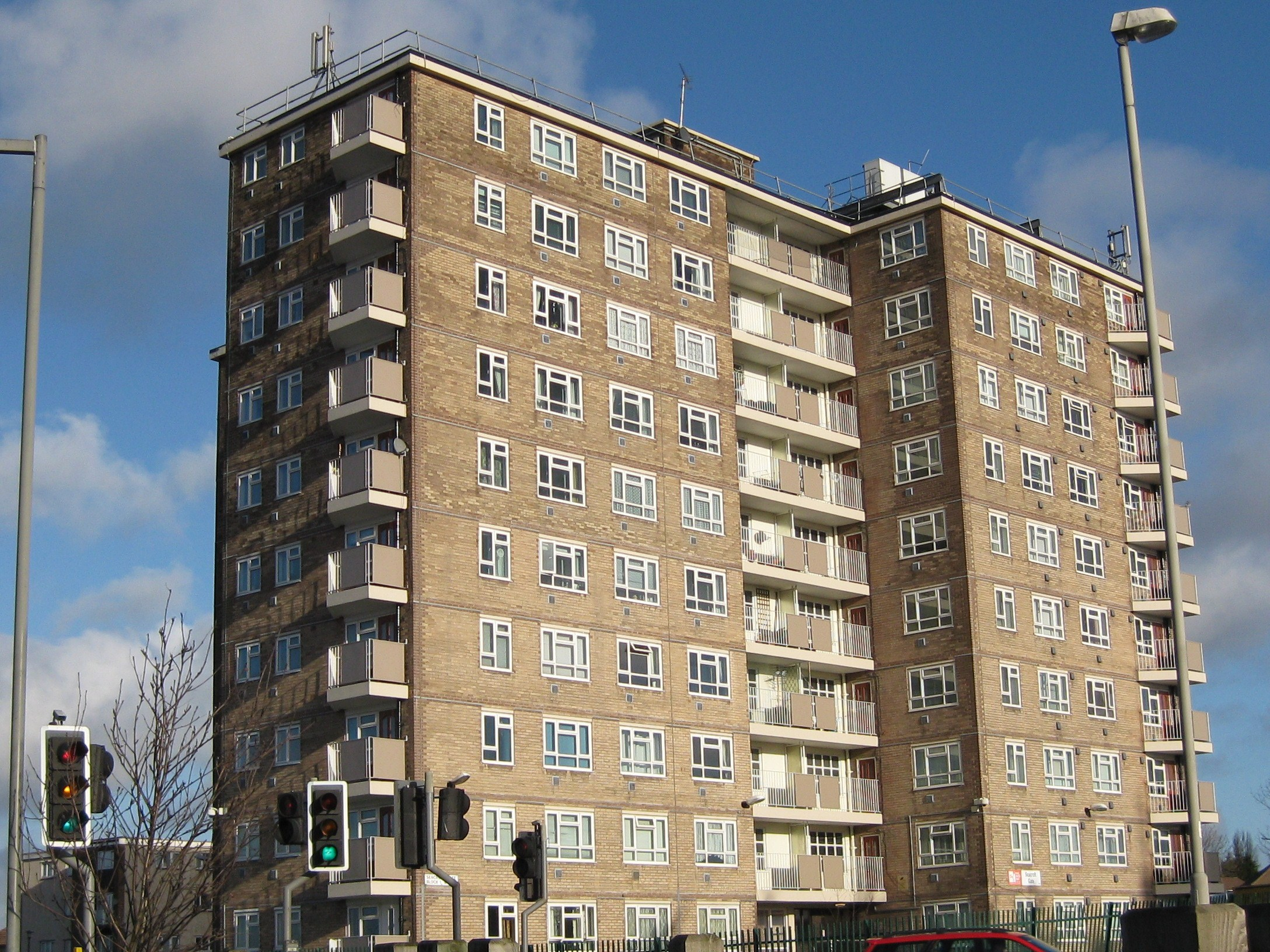
High rise flats adjacent to the ring road

The Village developed slowly over the centuries, and saw very little change until the post war years. In 1934, Leeds City Council bought 1,000 acres (4.0 km^{2}) for municipal housing and after World War II the majority of houses and blocks of flats were built. The council had planned for Seacroft to be a "satellite town within the city boundary".

=== Beechwood Estate ===
Circa 1950 - Original plan for the building on the northern part of the Beechwood Estate, later Seacroft

Work began in the early 1950s on what was originally known as the Beechwood Estate. Many of the older houses on the estate are more traditional red-brick semis. In the early 1950s, 500 Wates type houses - a prefabricated system construction - were built on the sub-divided north of the Lupton family's Beechwood Estate. In 2014, members of the Lupton family still retain ownership of the land around Asket Hill.

In the 1960s many prefabricated housing and high rise flats were constructed on the estate. Two main roads were built through the estate, these being North Parkway and South Parkway. North Parkway was built as a dual carriageway, in a similar way as had been done to Oak Tree Drive, Coldcotes Drive and Gipton Approach in neighbouring Gipton. In addition to this vision, other areas surrounding Seacroft were built using the same principle, in the early 1950s work started on building the Swarcliffe and Stanks areas and in the 1960s work began on building Whinmoor, none of these were however as large or ambitious as Seacroft, the intention being that these areas will use many of the amenities built along with the Seacroft Estate such as the Civic Centre and Seacroft's secondary schools. As such amenities were at a minimum in Swarcliffe and Whinmoor, with the estates only having parades of small local shops, public housing and primary schools. Seacroft also has the main central bus interchange for North East Leeds, although the nearest railway station is in Cross Gates.

Whether Seacroft ever achieved being a 'satellite town within the city boundary' is debatable, the success of such a claim may be measured by the self-sufficiency of the area. While the estate offered many amenities in the original civic centre and now offers modernised facilities in the Seacroft Green shopping centre, the estate lacked amenities such as a leisure centre. The area also offered very little in the way of employment, besides that provided by the shops and the few office blocks in the civic centre, there was only a small industrial estate, most of the major tenants (Cable and Wireless, Transco and many Leeds City Council facilities) have vacated the estate. Neighbouring Whinmoor contains major plants operated by Agfa and Unilever.

=== The Building of the Estate ===
Brooklands Avenue under construction in 1951

Cedarwood Corporation Houses

The architecture of Seacroft varied throughout the construction of the estate. The earlier houses dating back to the 1950s are a mixture of concrete houses and red brick traditional terraces and semis. In the late 1960s and 1970s the prefabricated housing built towards the South West of the estate was constructed. The build quality of these houses was considerably poor and most are now uninhabited. The older council houses were generally built to a higher quality and are still in good condition. The northern parts of the estate were generally built first (with the exception of pockets of temporary prefabs), leaving undeveloped land between Seacroft and Gipton and Killingbeck to the South and West in the early years.

Much of Seacroft was built twice, high demand for houses lead to many temporary prefabs being built in Seacroft shortly after the war. These were generally known as the 'war houses'. In the late 1960s and early 1970s these were replaced by the Cedarwood Corporation Houses (or 5M as they were referred to in council records). These were a quick and cheapm option of replacing the older prefabs. Like their predecessors they were also prefabricated houses, however were intended to last longer. Local people often refer to these as the 'gas houses' in comparison with the 'war houses' and in note of them having natural gas. The exact same style of building was used around Coal Road in Whinmoor and Queenswood Drive in Beckett Park.

During the 1960s and 1970s, a variety of styles of high rise flats were built. These were concentrated close to the civic centre, in the Bogart Hill and Ramshead areas of the estate and along the southern edge of the estate. Lower rise flats were also built around the civic centre in the 1960s. The Queensview flats were converted into sheltered accommodation in the 1990s.

Since the last of the prefabs (or gas houses) were finished in the early 1970s there was no further development of residencial properties in Seacroft until after the new century. Newer houses are now starting to be built around the Eastern end of South Parkway, most will be owned by a housing association.

The 1960s also saw the construction of the Seacroft Civic Centre, which was at the time a novel way of building an outdoor purpose built town centre. The centre was opened by the Queen Elizabeth II in 1965. The Civic Centre had a Grandways supermarket and a Woolworths as well as many other smaller shops, banks, pubs, an open market (which was converted into a car park in the 1980s) and a library.

It was hoped that the centre's proximity to the A58, A64 and outer ring road would attract people to the centre from further afield, however the 1970s saw the redevelopment of other regional commercial centres. The building of the Arndale Centre in neighbouring Cross Gates threatened the centre, unlike the Seacroft Civic Centre, the Arndale Centre was fully indoors, climate controlled and adjoined a busy railway station. As the number of chain shops in the Seacroft Centre dwindled and the centre housed more down market retailers, the Cross Gates Centre attracted national retailers such as Tesco, Boots the Chemist, Wilko and Woolworths (perhaps killing off the Seacroft Woolworths).

In the 1990s it had become apparent that the condition of the Civic Centre had deteriorated significantly in the 30 years since its construction. Talks were held with Leeds City Council, and Tesco were found as the preferred bidder to rebuild the Seacroft Civic Centre.

== 1990s and 2000s ==
=== Seacroft Green Shopping Centre ===
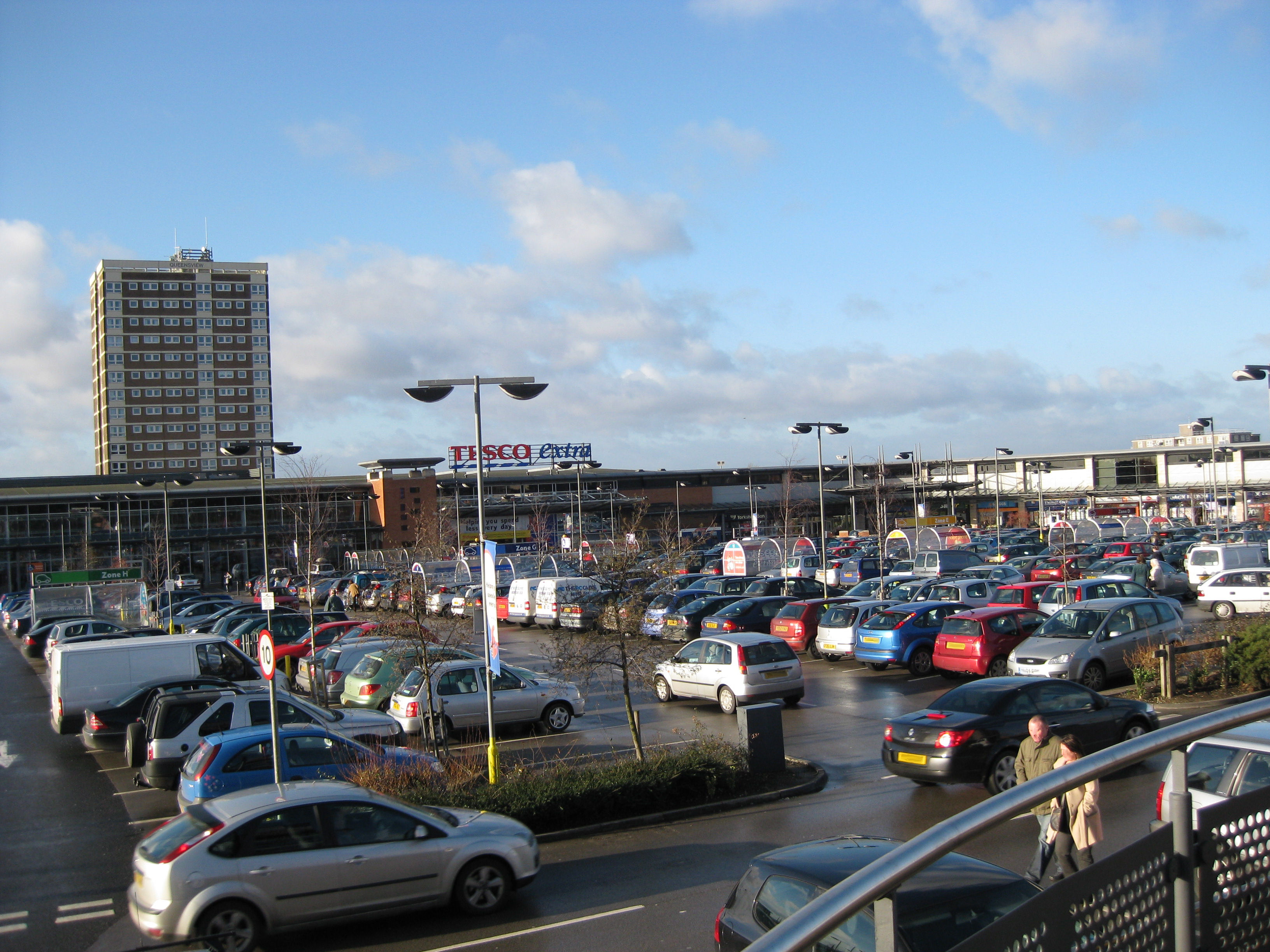
Tesco at The Seacroft Green Shopping Centre

In 1999, work began clearing the site and in the 2000s (decade) the new 'Seacroft Green Shopping Centre' opened. The Tesco was cited at the time to be the largest supermarket in Europe, a claim which may not have been true. It was however still an enormous supermarket spread over two levels (the second being a large mezzanine level). The car park was also enlarged and other shop units were built along the side of the supermarket, making the centre a crescent shape. The huge supermarket as well as the other shops promised to create hundreds more jobs than would be lost through the loss of trade in the Civic Centre; this was no doubt one factor which made the redevelopment favourable with many Seacroft residents.

The Seacroft Green Shopping Centre is also the main transport interchange in Seacroft, with the main bus station for Seacroft and the surrounding areas being centred there. From here buses run out through the estate as well as to the city centre, Wetherby and Harrogate. Seacroft bus station has five stands and an average daily footfall of 2,687. (See Transport)

The centre was not entirely popular with the local residents with many saying they had lost their town centre to a Tesco supermarket. To an extent this is true. Although there are shops besides Tesco, there are far fewer than there were; the precinct area has been lost, the pubs in the centre have been lost and there are no offices. Until the building of the new centre, and since the closure of Grandways, it was said that Seacroft suffered from 'food poverty' as fresh produce could not be bought on the estate. This was probably not true as there was still a Co-op on South Parkway.

The rebuilding of the Civic Centre did not however alter the deprivation on the estate. Throughout the 2000s (decade) the condition of many of the houses on the estate deteriorated, particularly amongst the prefabricated housing to the South West of the estate. Many houses were vacated and demolished to make way for new modern housing. The estate's high rise flats are seen as a refuge, and as such they have largely been allocated to older residents. Some (including Queensview) have become sheltered housing.

== Decline ==
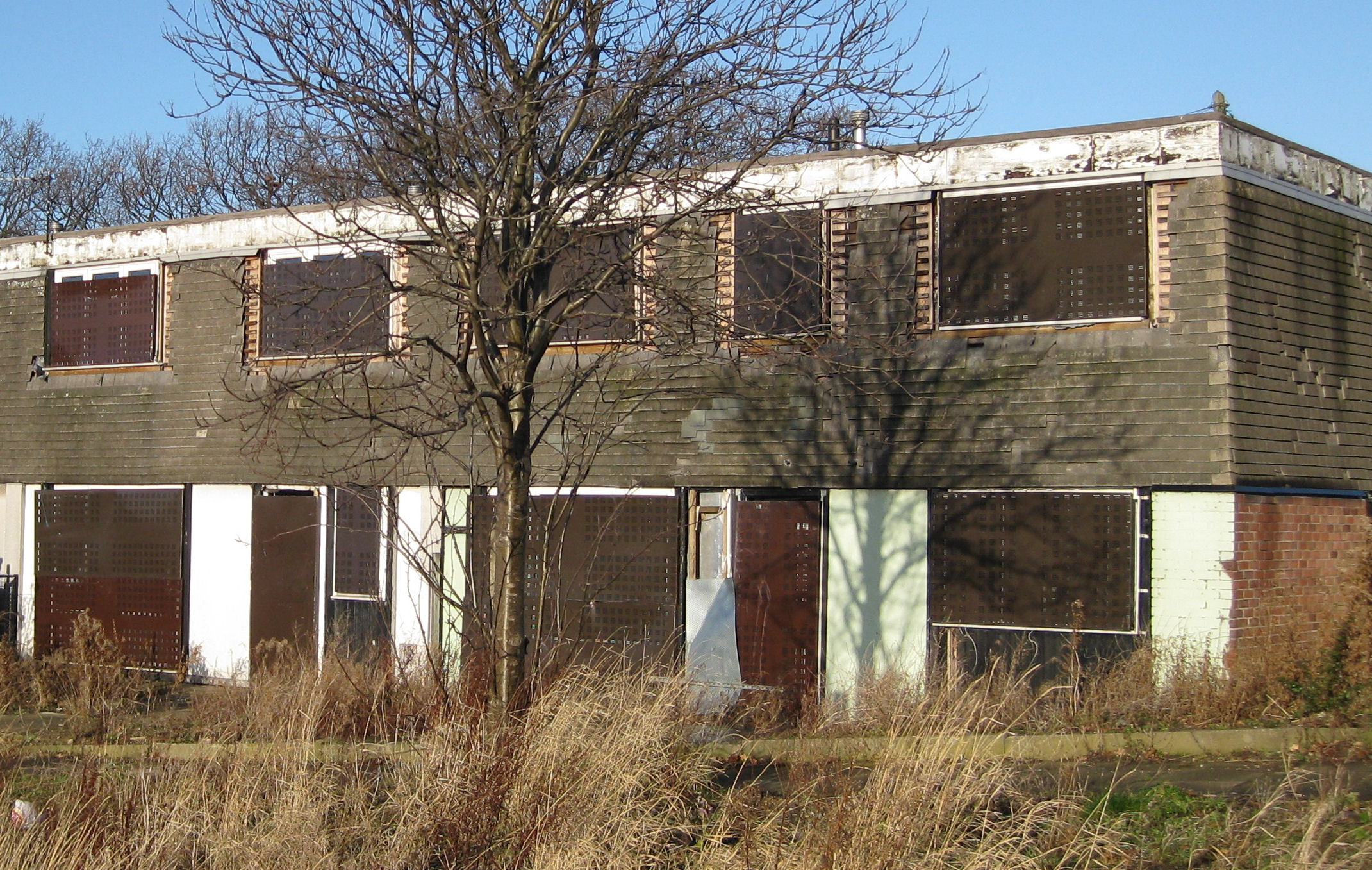
Council houses waiting demolition in Seacroft, 2009

While the estate enjoyed some popularity in its early years, offering residents modern houses and a more spacious community then the terraces available in other estates, the estate was one of the first in Leeds to decline in popularity. Crime rose consistently throughout each decade and the housing stock, in particular the prefabricated housing around South Parkway began to deteriorate. In the 2000s (decade) many of the prefabricated houses were boarded up and later demolished. By the Millennium, the estate had a reputation for being one of the worst in Leeds. The poor reputation Seacroft developed was shared with neighbouring Gipton. In 2007, there was a minor riot in the Hawkshead area of Seacroft. Racial motives were cited. Despite the run down looks of the estate, the Seacroft Green Shopping Centre is still in good condition, with Tesco and other retailers making a particular effort to keep the centre tidy. The estate still suffers from high unemployment.

== Seacroft Scroll ==
An illustrated history was prepared in 2018 in the form of a long wall chart, called the Seacroft Scroll, which has been displayed in libraries and schools. It is available free to download.
