= Medical education in the United Kingdom =

Medical education in the United Kingdom includes educational activities involved in the education and training of medical doctors in the United Kingdom, from entry-level training through to continuing education of qualified specialists. A typical outline of the medical education pathway is presented here. However training schemes vary in different pathways may be available.

== Medical school ==
Jeremy Hunt in 2016 got agreement to increase the number of doctors trained in England and five new medical schools were opened.

=== Assessments ===
Like many other university degrees, UK medical schools design and deliver their own in-house assessments. This practice is different from, for example, the United States, where a national licensing examination has been in place for over 20 years. Each UK undergraduate summative assessment in medicine is subject to the scrutiny of a formally appointed external examiner.

In 2003 a number of UK medical schools began to work together to increase quality assurance activities in the area of assessment as part of the Universities Medical Assessment Partnership (UMAP). UMAP is a collaborative item banking project seeking to build a quality assured written assessment item bank suitable for high-stakes examinations at all UK medical schools.

=== Qualities assurance of the undergraduate medical education ===
The UK General Medical Council (GMC) has the ability to reverse its endorsement of any medical undergraduate training course as part of its regular visiting schedule should a course fall short of the expected standards.

Due to the UK code for higher education, first degrees in medicine comprises an integrated programme of study and professional practice spanning several levels. The final outcomes of the qualifications typically meet the expectations of a higher education qualification at level 7 (the UK Master's degree). These degrees may retain, for historical reasons, "Bachelor of Medicine, Bachelor of Surgery" and are abbreviated to MBChB or MBBS.

== Specialty training and postgraduate studies ==
Following completion of medical school, junior doctors then enter a vocational training phase. In the UK a doctor's training normally follows this path:

- Newly qualified doctors enter a two-year Foundation Programme, where they undertake terms in a variety of different specialities. These must include training in General Medicine and General Surgery but can also include other fields such as Paediatrics, Anaesthetics or General Practice.
- Following completion of the Foundation Programme a doctor can choose to specialise in one or more fields. All routes involve further assessment and examinations.

=== General Practitioner ===
To train as a general practitioner (GP), after completing the Foundation Programme, a doctor must complete three years of speciality training. This comprises a minimum of 12 to 18 months of posts in a variety of hospital specialities - often including paediatrics, psychiatry, geriatrics and obstetrics & gynaecology. The trainee spends the remaining 18 to 24 months as a General Practice Speciality Registrar (GPST) - based in primary care. After completing this training and the membership exams and required portfolio of the Royal College of General Practitioners, the doctor will be awarded a Certificate of Completion of Training (CCT) from the GMC and can work as a General Practitioner and can practise independently as a post-CCT doctor. Many GPs undertake additional qualifications during training and may extend their training to accommodate these. There are also a number of post-CCT fellowships available for GPs. On qualifying, GPs will be added to the GMC General Practice Register, unlike their colleagues on the Specialty Register, GPs are unable to undertake formalised subspecialty training, however many have further qualifications in specialist areas and practice as sub-specialists.

=== Specialist Training ===
All doctors who are not training to be General Practitioners must complete an appropriate training pathway to gain entry to the General Medical Council specialty register, which provided eligibility to work as a Consultant Physician in the UK. Such training involved sitting a number of relevant postgraduate exams within their chosen speciality (e.g. Member of the Royal College of Physicians MRCP, Member of the Royal College of Surgeons MRCS) and competitive interview processes at various stages of training. Once this training pathway is completed a Certificate of Completion of Training (CCT) is awarded and the doctors name is added to the GMC Speciality Register.

The competition is significant for those who wish to attain the most sought after consultant posts and many trainees now complete higher degrees such as a Doctorate of Medicine (MD), which is a thesis-based award based on at least two years full-time equivalent research; or PhD which involves at least three years of full-time equivalent research. The time taken to get from medical school graduation to becoming a consultant varies from speciality to speciality but can be anything from 7 to over 10 years.

=== Evolution of Training Programmes ===
In the United Kingdom, doctors' training has been evolving, for example, with the introduction of run-through training programmes. These offer direct entry to a typically longer training programme after foundation training (providing a pathway to consultant without an additional re-application step after the first 2–3 years). These changes were proposed in accordance with the government-instituted plan for Modernising Medical Careers. They formed part of a drive to offer streamlined training pathways, although in light of the COVID-19 pandemic of 2020, some have argued that current training frameworks are now too inflexible. In UK trauma and orthopaedics, for instance, one study reported that trainees experienced a 43% reduction in surgical training activities due to the pandemic and all trainees in the study had their final examinations cancelled - a situation incompatible with fixed, time-limited training pathways. In plastic surgery it has also been questioned whether the training standards set by the Joint Committee on Surgical Training (JCST) are achievable in the new training climate.

Issues with training frameworks across all medical specialties had been identified previously and high-profile calls are now being made to change the system in favour of individualised training tailored to each trainee. In many ways this would be a return to the previous system.

== NHS medical career grades ==
Medical career grades of the National Health Service
Year	Current (Modernising Medical Careers)		Previous	
1	Foundation doctor -sometimes called Foundation House Officer, 2 years (FY1 and FY2)		Pre-registration house officer (PRHO), 1 year	
2	Foundation doctor -sometimes called Foundation House Officer, 2 years (FY1 and FY2)		Senior house officer (SHO), minimum 2 years; often more	
3	Core Trainee/Specialist Trainee, often still referred to as Senior house officer, CT/ST 1-2	Specialty registrar, general practice (GPST 1-3)	Senior house officer (SHO), minimum 2 years; often more	
4	Core Trainee/Specialist Trainee, often still referred to as Senior house officer, CT/ST 1-2	Specialty registrar, general practice (GPST 1-3)	Specialist registrar, 4–6 years	GP registrar, 1 year
5	Specialty registrar, hospital speciality (SpR, CT 3/ ST 3-6+)	Specialty registrar, general practice (GPST 1-3)	Specialist registrar, 4–6 years	General practitioner, 4 years total time in training
6	Specialty registrar, hospital speciality (SpR, CT 3/ ST 3-6+)	General practitioner, minimum 5 years total time in training	Specialist registrar, 4–6 years	General practitioner, 4 years total time in training
7	Specialty registrar, hospital speciality (SpR, CT 3/ ST 3-6+)	General practitioner, minimum 5 years total time in training	Consultant, minimum 7 years total time in training	General practitioner, 4 years total time in training
8	Consultant, minimum 7–9 years total time in training	General practitioner, minimum 5 years total time in training	Consultant, minimum 7 years total time in training	General practitioner, 4 years total time in training
Optional	Training is competency based, times shown are a minimum. Training may be extended by obtaining an Academic Clinical Fellowship for research or by dual certification in another speciality.		Training may be extended by pursuing medical research (usually 2–3 years), usually with clinical duties as well	

== Continuing medical education ==
Continuing medical education is now mandatory for all doctors, under guidelines from the General Medical Council and Clinical governance.

== Controversies ==
=== Selection ===
==== The Foundation Programme ====
Those hoping to work in the UK in foundation year one posts apply to a process co-ordinated by the United Kingdom Foundation Programme Office (UKFPO). Applicants are ranked based on a number of factors. Half of the marks available are awarded based on the candidate's performance in a situational judgement test, sat by every applicant for the programme. This examination is taken in two fortnight-long windows, typically before and after Christmas.

During the first summative running of the UKFPO's Situational Judgement Test, issues were identified with the automatic marking process used which led to candidates being given incorrect scores. Offers were rescinded shortly after being made, and medical schools were required to remark all papers manually, delaying the application process. Following the re-marking, 148 applicants had their offers altered.

During the 2021 application cycle, invigilation policies for candidates sitting the Situational Judgement Test outside of examination centres were covered in the mainstream media following reports that candidates were incontinent of urine after invigilators denied them permission to step away from their screens to use toilets.

During the 2022 application cycle, the UKFPO apologised after it was heavily criticised for updating its website during the examination cycle to highlight a resource explaining how to address a type of question being introduced for the first time in that year's diet. The UKFPO was further criticised by applicants for the tone in its response to those raising concerns about the fairness of this.

==== Higher specialty training ====
On 4 May 2018, the Royal College of Physicians apologised for a "human error" which resulted in incorrect scores being given to applicants for higher specialty training in the physician specialties. This error - identified three months before candidates were due to take up new roles - required job offers to be rescinded and re-issued based on corrected scoring. Concerns were raised that those candidates whose job offers were in different parts of the country may have already made financial commitments in preparation for moving for their new posts.

=== Postgraduate examinations ===
The Royal College of Emergency Medicine announced on 16 May 2022, that a number of candidates who had sat part of the Fellowship of the Royal College of Emergency Medicine two months previously had been incorrectly told they had passed the examination. This exam is sat by postgraduate doctors in training nearing completion of their training in emergency medicine; completion of training, or progression to higher stages of training, is contingent on passing it.

The Royal College of Surgeons were heavily criticised for a question encountered by candidates sitting the September 2022 diet of the Membership of the Royal Colleges of Surgeons of Great Britain and Ireland part A exam. This question was described by the Association of LGBTQ+ Doctors and Dentists as "built around harmful stereotypes and prejudice towards members of the LGBTQ+ community".

The Royal College of Obstetrics and Gynaecology cancelled the September 2022 diet of the MRCOG seven days before candidates were due to sit it. This arose due to the decision of its exam delivery partner, Pearson Vue, to close their UK centres on 19 September 2022, following the UK Government's announcement of a bank holiday to mark the funeral of Queen Elizabeth II. Affected UK candidates were offered a resit; the examination will proceed as planned outside of the UK.

== See also ==
- Certificate of Completion of Training
- Clinical governance
- INMED
- Modernising Medical Careers
- Medical education in Wales
- Medical education in Scotland
