= Medical education in Wales =

Education of medical students

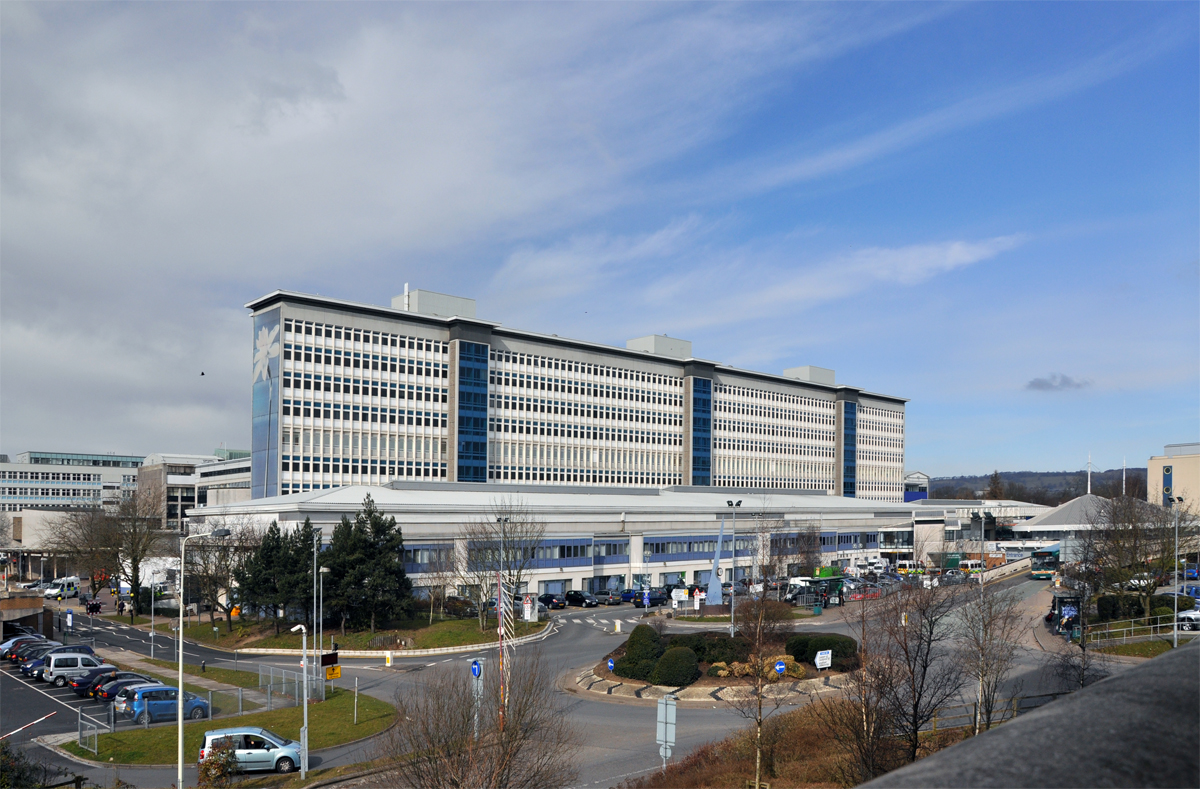
University Hospital of Wales, Heath Park, Cardiff

Medical education in Wales is the education of medical students and qualified medical doctors in Wales.

== Medical schools ==
There are currently three dedicated medical schools in Wales:

- Cardiff University School of Medicine
- Swansea University Medical School
- North Wales Medical School (Bangor University)

Cardiff's is the earliest of the three, founded in 1893, whereas Swansea's was first established as a clinical school in 2001 and later becoming a medical school in 2004 and receiving independent awarding rights in 2014. For 2024 entry, Cardiff offers a five undergraduate medicine course with 295 total places and a four year postgraduate course following graduation from a recognised 3 year feeder course with 10 places. Swansea offers a four year graduate entry course with 142 places.

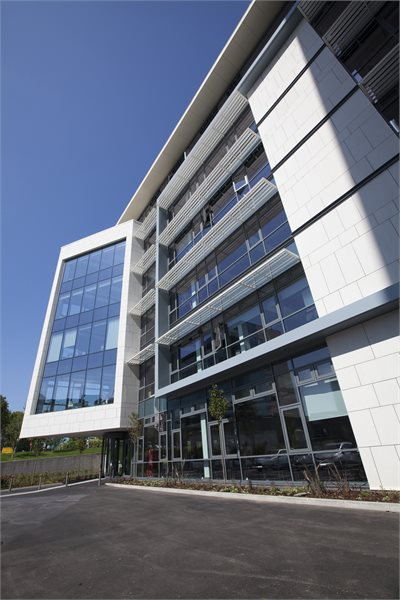
Swansea University Medical School - Data Science building

In 2019, Bangor University began a Graduate Entry Medicine course in collaboration with Cardiff University. In January 2023, it was confirmed that Bangor University would be forming North Wales Medical School, teaching and awarding both four-year graduate entry medicine and five-year undergraduate courses from September 2024. The new medical school offers 140 places, set to be expanded to capacity from 2029.

=== Welsh medium education ===
Medical students in Wales would have the option to study at least 30% of their degree in Welsh for the first time from 2015 according to Coleg Cymraeg Cenedlaethol, and receive a scholarship by doing so. In 2021 there were 71 students in Wales pursuing their medical studies in Welsh.

In 2017 a six-part television series, Doctoriaid Yfory, followed students at Cardiff University who were able to use the Welsh language as part of the training, preparing them in particular to work in Welsh-speaking areas of Wales.

From 2023 all medical students in year two of Cardiff medical school will receive mandatory Welsh language training. Students can choose to be part of the fluent, non-fluent and non-Welsh streams, allowing tailored training. Awen Iorwerth, a clinical lecturer at Cardiff medical school, said: "We know that receiving care from someone who recognizes and - possibly - speaks your mother tongue leads to better results and satisfaction." "Recent research has shown that medical students with Welsh skills are more likely to stay and work in Wales after graduating." Swansea medical school also reported an increase from 50 to 62 of their graduate medical students having Welsh language lessons.

== Postgraduate education ==
Following completion of medical school, resident doctors then enter a vocational training phase. In Wales a doctor's training normally follows this path:

=== Welsh Foundation School ===
The Wales Foundation Programme is coordinated by the Wales Foundation School which is based within Health Education Improvement Wales. These offices are in Nantgarw, South Wales. Welsh Unpaired Foundation Programme: Foundation Doctors can select F2 placements following the start of their Foundation training and can apply for placement anywhere in Wales, regardless of their F1 placement. The Foundation programmes in Wales meet the clinical competency as required by the Foundation Programme Curriculum and General Medical Council (GMC) national standards and allow full GMC registration.

=== Speciality Training ===
==== General Practice ====
To train as a general practitioner (GP), after completing a Foundation Programme (not limited to Wales), a doctor must complete three years of speciality training (ST). This comprises a minimum of 12 to 18 months of posts in a variety of hospital specialities - often including paediatrics, psychiatry, geriatrics and obstetrics & gynaecology.

==== Hospital Specialty ====
After successfully completing a Foundation Programme (not limited to Wales), doctors can pursue Core Training (CT) that lasts two to three years which depends on the specialty. After completion of CT training, doctors can enter a ST post via open competition.

Alternatively, those who complete a Foundation Programme can apply for a run-through programme which lasts five to seven years.

==== Certificate of Completion of Training ====
A Certificate of Completion of Training (CCT) is awarded after competencies are met in specialty programme. This allows registration on either the GMC specialist register or GP register, depending on speciality training. Doctors can then apply for a Consultant job or GP job after this registration.

Medical career grades of the National Health Service
Year	Current (Modernising Medical Careers)		Previous	
1	Foundation doctor (FY1 and FY2), 2 years		Pre-registration house officer (PRHO), 1 year	
2	Foundation doctor (FY1 and FY2), 2 years		Senior house officer (SHO), minimum 2 years; often more	
3	Specialty registrar, general practice (GPST), minimum 3 years	Specialty registrar, hospital speciality (SpR), minimum 5 years	Senior house officer (SHO), minimum 2 years; often more	
4	Specialty registrar, general practice (GPST), minimum 3 years	Specialty registrar, hospital speciality (SpR), minimum 5 years	Specialist registrar, 4–6 years	GP registrar, 1 year
5	Specialty registrar, general practice (GPST), minimum 3 years	Specialty registrar, hospital speciality (SpR), minimum 5 years	Specialist registrar, 4–6 years	General practitioner, 4 years total time in training
6–8	General practitioner, minimum 5 years total time in training	Specialty registrar, hospital speciality (SpR), minimum 5 years	Specialist registrar, 4–6 years	General practitioner, 4 years total time in training
9	General practitioner, minimum 5 years total time in training	Consultant, minimum 7 years total time in training	Consultant, minimum 7–9 years total time in training	General practitioner, 4 years total time in training
Optional	Training is competency based, times shown are a minimum. Training may be extended by obtaining an Academic Clinical Fellowship for research or by dual certification in another speciality.		Training may be extended by pursuing medical research (usually 2–3 years), usually with clinical duties as well	

=== Continuing medical education ===
Continuing professional development is now mandatory for all doctors, under guidelines from the General Medical Council.

== Recruitment and retention ==
=== Medical students ===
In 2012, 670 students applied to study medicine which decreased to 570 in 2015.

In 2017, 410 students began studying medicine or dentistry in 2018, increasing by 23% from 2017.

For 2023/24, the Welsh Government dedicated an additional £7.14 million for medical student training. From September 2024 there will be 305 medical students starting training at Cardiff, 142 at Swansea and 140 at Bangor, bringing the total number of students starting studies in Wales to 587 students.

=== Medical doctors ===
On the 1 December 2015 there were 493 vacancies (7.8%) for doctors in Welsh health boards. This was lower than comparable figures in England and Northern Ireland (NI).

The number of speciality training doctors as well as the fill rate of these positions has increased in Wales from 2018 to 2020. In 2018 348 of 409 positions for filled; up to 394 of 415 in 2019; up to 425 of 428 in 2020.

In 2021, there were 3,107 GPs resident in Wales, of which 742 were over the age of 60. With this being a higher proportion than England, Scotland or NI, concern was raised that not enough was being done to prepare for recruiting more GPs to replace retiring ones.

A 2022 report by the GMC found that most medical students who graduate in Scotland, NI or England remain in that country, but in Wales 46% move to England due to more availability of foundation training posts. Wales retained 77% of newly-qualified GPs and specialists after four years whereas in England, this figure was 92%. There were also 271.4 patients per doctor in Wales compared to 242.9 patients per doctor in both Scotland and England. Overall, Wales did have an increase in the number of doctors; from 10,105 in 2017; up to 11,046 in 2020; and up again to 11,615 licensed doctors in 2021. This means that the total doctors in Wales increased by 15%, more than Scotland or NI, but behind England at 16%.

Between 2015 and 2017 there was an increase of 2.9% in the number of paediatric consultants in Wales although at least 73 consultant paediatricians (42% increase) was needed for appropriate level of care according to the Royal College of Paediatrics and Child health. Concern was also raised by the Royal college of Radiologists about the number of oncologist trainees with the number of oncology consultants lower than Scotland, England and NI. They called on the Welsh Government to increase funding for training posts in oncology in Wales.

==== North Wales ====
The development of North Wales Medical School was part of an effort to improve medical doctor recruitment in North Wales. In Betsi Cadwaladr University Health Board, there are currently 28 vacant GP positions that are currently filled in by locum staff.

== See also ==
- List of Welsh medical pioneers
- Healthcare in Wales
- Certificate of Completion of Training
- Clinical governance
- INMED
- Modernising Medical Careers
