= Medical education in Scotland =

Education of medical students

A map of the five medical schools of Scotland.

Medical education in Scotland includes the education of medical students and qualified medical doctors in Scotland.

== Medical schools ==
Wolfson Medical School, University of Glasgow

Scotland has five medical schools: Edinburgh, Glasgow, St Andrews, Dundee and Aberdeen.

=== Courses ===
The undergraduate medicine MBChB courses at Glasgow, Dundee and Aberdeen are 5 years long; the MBChB undergraduate degree at Edinburgh is 6 years long; and St Andrews has a 3 year BSc degree before students finish the last 3 years at a partner university to obtain an MBChB/MBBS.

The graduate entry course, known as ScotGEM is four years long with the first and second year at the University of St Andrews and the third and fourth year with the University of Dundee.

=== Admission statistics ===
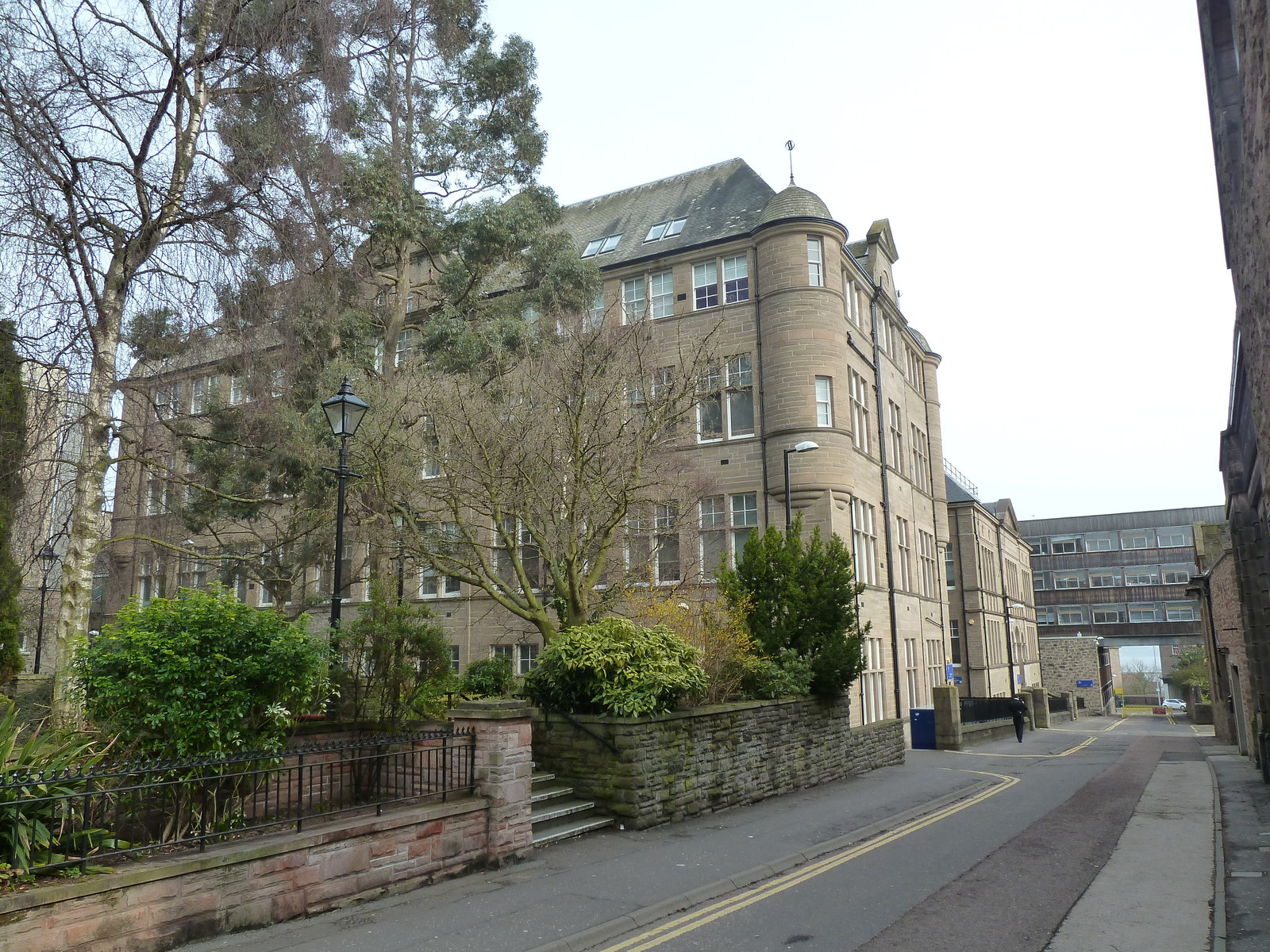
Old medical school, University of Dundee

All five participate in the Reach national initiative, with applications from the poorest 40% of areas increasing by 60% since the beginning of the initiative. During the same period, the number being accepted from the same areas has increased by 50%.

The number of medical school places in Scotland for the last five years was as follows;

- 1,013 in 2019/20
- 1,038 in 2020/21
- 1,117 in 2021/22
- 1,317 in 2022/23
- 1,417 in 2023/24

In 2019/20, an increased target was set for the number of Scottish students enrolled at medical school. All medical school places in Scotland were increased by another 15-20 places for 2023.

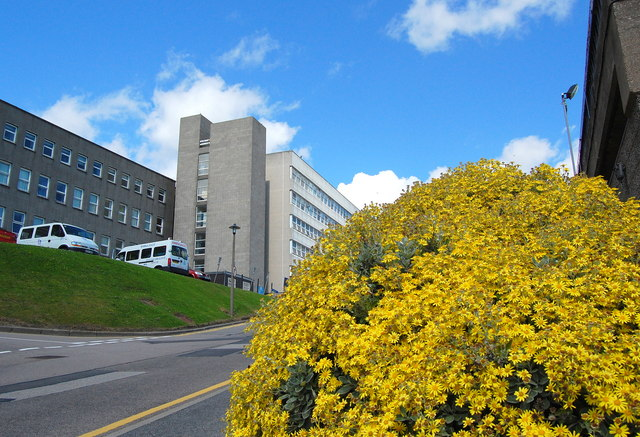
Aberdeen medical school

Intake target breakdown, 2023-24
Medical School	Core	ScotGEM	Widening Access	GP Track	HCP-Med	International	Total intake target
Aberdeen	200	-	24	55	-	19	298
Dundee	180	-	24	-	-	16	220
Edinburgh	245	-	25	-	35	21	326
Glasgow	269	-	25	30	-	22	346
St Andrews	145	70	12	-	-	-	227
Total	1,039	70	110	85	35	78	1,417

== Postgraduate education ==
Following completion of medical school, junior doctors then enter a vocational training phase. In Scotland a doctor's training normally follows this path:

=== Scottish Foundation School ===
The Scottish Foundation School covers the four regions of Scotland: North, East, South East and West. It is managed by the Foundation Programme Board and the Foundation Programme Directors are responsible for Foundation training in each region.

The training standards for Foundation year 1 are published by the General Medical Council (GMC) :Outcomes for Provisionally Registered Doctors" (GMC July 2015). The two-year programmes are delivered within the national operational framework agreed by the Departments of Health. The curriculum is approved by the GMC.

=== Speciality Training ===
==== General Practice ====
To train as a general practitioner (GP), after completing a Foundation Programme (not limited to Scotland), a doctor must complete three years of speciality training (ST). This comprises a minimum of 12 to 18 months of posts in a variety of hospital specialities - often including paediatrics, psychiatry, geriatrics and obstetrics & gynaecology.

==== Hospital Specialty ====
After successfully completing a Foundation Programme (not limited to Scotland), doctors can pursue Core Training (CT) that lasts two to three years which depends on the specialty. After completion of CT training, doctors can enter a ST post via open competition.

Alternatively, those who complete a Foundation Programme can apply for a run-through programme which lasts five to seven years.

==== Consultant ====
In NHS Scotland, a doctor must train for a minimum of six years training in a speciality to attain a certificate of completion of training (CCT) and be listed on the GMC's specialist register in addition to a full license to practice. Those that did not train in the UK can apply for the Certificate of Eligibility for Specialist Registration (CESR) route instead of CCT. to apply for a consultant role in NHS Scotland, a doctor must apply directly to a job advert on the NHS Scotland jobs website.

Medical career grades of the National Health Service
Year	Current (Modernising Medical Careers)		Previous	
1	Foundation doctor (FY1 and FY2), 2 years		Pre-registration house officer (PRHO), 1 year	
2	Foundation doctor (FY1 and FY2), 2 years		Senior house officer (SHO), minimum 2 years; often more	
3	Specialty registrar, general practice (GPST), minimum 3 years	Specialty registrar, hospital speciality (SpR), minimum 5 years	Senior house officer (SHO), minimum 2 years; often more	
4	Specialty registrar, general practice (GPST), minimum 3 years	Specialty registrar, hospital speciality (SpR), minimum 5 years	Specialist registrar, 4–6 years	GP registrar, 1 year
5	Specialty registrar, general practice (GPST), minimum 3 years	Specialty registrar, hospital speciality (SpR), minimum 5 years	Specialist registrar, 4–6 years	General practitioner, 4 years total time in training
6–8	General practitioner, minimum 5 years total time in training	Specialty registrar, hospital speciality (SpR), minimum 5 years	Specialist registrar, 4–6 years	General practitioner, 4 years total time in training
9	General practitioner, minimum 5 years total time in training	Consultant, minimum 7 years total time in training	Consultant, minimum 7–9 years total time in training	General practitioner, 4 years total time in training
Optional	Training is competency based, times shown are a minimum. Training may be extended by obtaining an Academic Clinical Fellowship for research or by dual certification in another speciality.		Training may be extended by pursuing medical research (usually 2–3 years), usually with clinical duties as well	
