= Medical Training Application Service =

The Medical Training Application Service (MTAS, pronounced em-tass) was an on-line application system set up under the auspices of Modernising Medical Careers in 2007 and used for the selection of Foundation House Officers and Specialty Registrars, and allocating them to jobs in the UK. Its implementation was heavily criticised both in the press and within the medical profession, and its operation was marked by the resignation of key staff and serious security breaches. The system affected junior doctors, and so every qualified doctor in the UK who had not yet attained Consultant status.

== Overview of the system prior to MMC ==
Prior to the introduction of Modernising Medical Careers (MMC), junior doctors who had completed their initial training after medical school (formerly the Pre-registration house officer or PRHO grade) could apply for posts as a Senior House Officer (SHO). They could apply for as many posts as they wished, and would be selected by their future employers based on their CV / application form and interview. They could devise their own training programme or apply to be part of a training rotation – usually entailing changing jobs every six months, but staying within the same speciality and hospital. Whilst training, an SHO would be encouraged to take professional exams to enable them to become a member of one of the medical royal colleges. Once this was achieved, they could apply for jobs as a specialist registrar. The lack of formal structure between the PRHO grade and the specialist registrar grade led to SHOs being labelled as a "lost tribe". During the MTAS crisis, however, "The Lost Tribe" was used to refer to doctors who were not able to proceed using the new computer system and as a result were left with no career at all, and so in a worse situation that the original "Lost Tribe" the system had been intended to help.

== MTAS application process ==
Under MTAS, junior doctors who had completed the PRHO grade, and more recently the Foundation House Officer grades, along with those who already had up to several years of experience working at the old SHO (next grade up) level, were invited to submit an electronic application form on the MTAS website. Applications could be made to one speciality in four geographic areas (called 'Units of Application' or UoAs), or to two specialties in two UoAs, or four specialties in one UoA. There were twelve geographical areas: one each for Scotland, Wales and Northern Ireland; one covering the whole of London, Kent, Surrey and Sussex; and eight others. The completed application forms were used for selection for interviews. Candidates who were not eligible (for example, not having practised medicine for a number of years, or not being registered with the UK General Medical Council) were rejected at the 'longlisting' stage, with the 'shortlisting' stage designed to pick out the best applicants.

=== Scoring of applicants ===
The application form consisted of shortlisting questions with space for 150-word answers. One of the changes promoted by the new system was that little (25%) importance was given to past experience, achievements, or examinations passed in the specialties, while the majority of the weighting for selection was based on the 150-word answers in the electronic application form (75% weighting). This was in sharp contrast to the previous CV-led process where past experience, achievements and examinations passed in the specialties were used to shortlist candidates for interview.

The questions on which the majority of the score was based were heavily criticised both at the time by the medical professionals obliged to answer them and subsequently in the independent review of MMC led by Professor John Tooke. The report commented:

"Free-text boxes encouraged plagiarism and commercial websites sold responses. Plagiarism was common but the promised plagiarism software did not function initially. Even when it did, plagiarism detection was relatively unhelpful as it could identify similar responses but could not identify whether the applicant composed or copied the text and thus could not be used to exclude applicants. In addition, the word limit was felt to be too restrictive by many.

Shortlisting was widely regarded as uneven and unfair, with the Tooke Report noting: "Some excellent candidates not shortlisted. Many very poor candidates were shortlisted." A number of local schools withdrew from the process in protest, with the North Central London School of Anaesthesia noting "It is our professional duty as shortlisters to make sure that the appointment process is carried out correctly and that all candidates are considered equally and fairly. There have been a series of serious procedural errors during the process[...]There has been a general recognition that round 1 of MTAS has been unfair and ineffective."

=== Interviews ===
The interviews were again designed to be unbiased, in that, once selected for interview, the application form would be ignored, and CVs would not be allowed at interview. Instead, defined questions with explicit marking schemes gave scores to the candidate's answers by looking for certain phrases and keywords. Again, the emphasis here was on removing possible bias due to a candidate's past achievements and experience, and focusing only on the performance at the standardised interview.

As with other areas of the scheme, the interview process attracted several criticisms at independent review as they were "felt by many to be too formulaic and politically correct rather than sufficiently probing to demonstrate differences in competencies and abilities", they were frequently too short ("In many cases the time allocated to interviews was the minimum of 30 minutes which some interviewers felt was insufficient"), and they failed to reward those with high academic achievements, who "were particularly disadvantaged by a non-CV based process."

After the first round of interviews, there was a plan for a second round of applications. Candidates who were unsuccessful in both rounds would have no further opportunity to gain access to a training job in the UK for the year ahead, as MMC meant it was impossible to recruit junior doctors after the single specified start date.

Application forms were released in February 2007, with two weeks to complete and submit. The first round of interviews were due to be carried out in February, March, and April 2007 with applicants finding out whether they were successful in May. The second round was to take place after this, finishing in late June 2007.

== Theoretical benefits of MTAS ==
In theory, the new application system centralised the application process, reducing the workload for consultants in shortlisting candidates for interview, and the workload of candidates applying multiple times for different posts.

Unfortunately in practice the centralised system failed, with MTAS withdrawn after the matching process, and the workload for consultants was hugely increased, as evidenced in several of the resignation letters prompted by the procedure: "The Consultants involved in shortlisting have all worked long hours, often at weekends or during half term holidays, and have done their utmost to cooperate[...]Most of us had 48 hours in which to carry out shortlisting of up to 650 applications.".

== Problems with MTAS ==
=== Theoretical problems ===
Theoretical concerns behind the process include:

1. The MTAS system was based on five academic papers all produced by Fiona Patterson. The papers were based on a very small sample size and made clear that the correlation between successful completion of the MTAS form and having the competencies required to be a successful doctor was 0.35, or poor.
2. It was decided to make a 'clean break' with the old system of Senior House Officer training by making all SHOs currently in training apply through the system. These doctors were between six months and six years into their training in a particular speciality. Many had higher qualifications such as membership of the Royal College of Physicians (MRCP) or had taken part in research in their chosen speciality. It was a common misconception amongst more senior colleagues that SHOs would essentially be reapplying for their old jobs. Given the centralised nature of the selection process, this was not the case. Tabulation of the number of jobs at each level revealed that there were far fewer posts in the upper ranks of training than there were doctors already at that stage, which left many doctors partially trained and without a career under the new system.
3. Since geographical units of application were so large, candidates had to be prepared to work in a huge area of the country, or to compromise on their speciality since they were warned that making fewer than four choices would place them at a disadvantage. This was extremely hard for those who had family or financial ties.
4. Because interview and selection took place centrally, rather than at the employing institution or hospital, specialist institutions had no input into the particular skills and attributes needed to work in particular posts.
5. An application via MTAS was seen as an endorsement for Modernising Medical Careers, leading to a moral dilemma for those disagreeing with the system but obliged to apply in order to have a chance of a job.

=== Implementation problems ===
1. The system used horizontal marking, whereby each of a single candidate's responses were marked by a different set of markers. Unfortunately, candidates were not informed that this would occur, and many had assumed the entire form would have been marked by the same markers. Consequently, candidates that cross referenced their answers across the form (e.g., by writing "as detailed in my answer above") failed to score marks compared to candidates who did not do this.
2. The online application system frequently became overloaded which meant that potential applicants were unable to log into the site, complete or submit their forms. The application deadline was extended by 48 hours to enable candidates to submit their forms
3. Some forms were "lost" in the online system, and parts of other forms were not visible to markers.
4. The "double-blind" system for marking failed. Each form should have been marked independently by two consultants to ensure mistakes by one marker are covered by the second marker. Unfortunately, some forms were only marked by one consultant.
5. Not all forms were marked by consultants. Many deaneries asked non-medical staff to help them meet their deadlines. It is unclear whether these non-medical staff were appropriately trained to mark the papers, and whether applicants were disadvantaged or advantaged if their forms were marked by non-medical staff.
6. Exceptional candidates received no interviews. A large proportion of candidates who had already passed professional exams, had PhDs or research experience in the relevant speciality and many with considerable clinical experience were not shortlisted for interviews. This was largely due to the weighting of questionnaire responses over academic and clinical achievements.

=== Security concerns ===
The security of the system failed, with personal details including phone numbers, home addresses and sexual orientation of junior doctors publicly available for several hours to anyone with the right URL. The following day it was reported that applicants had been able to see each other's files by changing two digits in the personalised web address given to each individual, and the system was suspended.

== Attempts to repair interview process ==
The allegations of widespread execution problems led to a review and a rolling program of sweeping changes, leaving the junior doctors in the system unsure of where they stood for long periods. The review stated that everyone should be entitled to keep any previous interviews in hand and also have an interview for their first choice if this was in England, with Wales and Scotland deciding to interview all applicants for all posts. Applicants for English programmes were able to make any of their four initial choices into their new first choice if they wished, in order to maximise the number of interviews they would have. This extra round of interviews was called Round 1B. Estimates are that there were 30,000 extra interviews requiring at least 15,000 consultant hours of interview time.

The initial offers from Rounds 1 & 1B were made by 10 June 2007. Round 2 started on 22 June and was organised locally as the MTAS system was offline. Round 2 continued until 31 October 2007, three months after the process should have been completed. The guidance from MMC indicated that any junior doctor in substantive employment on 31 July, and taking part in Round 2 will be guaranteed employment until the end of Round 2 in October, "Please note that all applicants who applied to MTAS who are in substantive NHS employment on 31 July will continue to have employment while they progress through Round 2".

There was, however, a general feeling amongst those involved in the system that it was beyond repair and further efforts to do so constituted an example of 'irrational escalation'.

== Repercussions ==
The British Medical Association (the largest trade union body representing doctors) pulled out of the review panel after their announcement that each doctor would only be given one interview. Organisations like the Royal College of Surgeons stated that they had lost confidence in the system.

The BMA later rejoined the review and have since lent their support to the proposed changes ("Round 1B"). However, following an outcry by members and a controversial letter to The Times newspaper, Mr James Johnson, Chairman of the BMA resigned on 20 May 2007, citing his reasons for leaving as the contents of the letter.

On 30 March 2007 Professor Alan Crockard resigned as National Director of Modernising Medical Careers. In his resignation letter he stated that he has "responsibility but less and less authority" and that "the overriding message coming back from the profession is that it has lost confidence in the current recruitment system".

On 3 April 2007, during an interview on BBC Radio 4's Today programme, the Health Secretary Patricia Hewitt apologised to junior doctors over the crisis, saying that the application scheme had caused "needless anxiety and distress". The British Medical Association welcomed the government's acknowledgement of the problem but stated that "an apology isn't enough". Patricia Hewitt's apology was repeated to parliament on 16 April 2007, however she stated that, "the problems that have arisen relate in the main to the implementation process and not to the underlying principles of Modernising Medical Careers." Later that month Ms Hewitt was accused by the opposition of failing to express genuine regret over the fiasco.

The MTAS website was suspended on 26 April 2007 after a Channel 4 News report stated that applicants had been able to see each other's files by changing two digits in the personalised web address given to each individual. At that point the Department of Health announced that this was a temporary suspension.

Ms Hewitt made another apology on 1 May 2007 in the House of Commons after the suspension of the MTAS website due to security breaches that she described as "utterly deplorable". On 3 May, Hewitt appeared on BBC Question Time where she faced hostile questioning from a junior doctor over MTAS failures.

On 15 May 2007 MTAS was shelved by ministers due to security breaches. Patricia Hewitt said that after the first round of recruitment, the system would only fulfil a monitoring role.

A judicial review of MTAS was successfully called for by pressure group Remedy UK, who demanded that the appointments process should be scrapped altogether. The case was heard in the High Court from 16 to 17 May 2007, where the BMA sided with the government despite an overwhelming majority of their own membership opposing MTAS. On Wednesday 23 May 2007 Mr Justice Goldring ruled against Remedy UK, stating that "although far from ideal", the Review Group's decision on amending the appointments process after the first round of interviews was "within the range of reasonable responses", and that the Review Group was "entitled to reach the decision it did given the circumstances facing it at the time". Although he ruled against invalidating the interviews that had already taken place, Mr Justice Goldring added that this judgement did not imply that junior doctors were not entitled to feel aggrieved, as "the premature introduction of MTAS has had disastrous consequences". Remedy UK have said they will not appeal the verdict, in order to avoid further uncertainty for junior doctors.

== Cost ==
The estimated cost of MTAS was £6.3m.
