= Non-consultant hospital doctor =

Medical practitioner in Ireland

Non-consultant hospital doctor (NCHD), sometimes also referred to as junior doctor, is a term used in Ireland to describe qualified medical practitioners who work under the (direct or nominal) supervision of a consultant in a particular speciality. It is an umbrella term, encompassing doctors on formal postgraduate training schemes as well as doctors in "service" roles outside of postgraduate training.

The clinical duties and responsibilities of NCHDs are varied but centre around the provision of medical care to patients. Examples of work carried out by NCHDs includes the diagnosis and treatment of medical conditions, performing therapeutic and diagnostic tests and interaction with other healthcare professionals. A clinical team made up of a consultant, or group of consultants, along with a cohort of NCHDs, is the core of medical service delivery in the Irish hospital system. A NCHD may be in a training programme or in a non-training role. Non-training doctors are employed most commonly at SHO or registrar level, and hold either 6 or 12 months contracts, a small number hold permanent posts. The doctors employed in non-training posts are not eligible for the trainee specialist division, and are most commonly registered on the general or supervised divisions of the Irish Medical Council register.

== Post-Graduate Training and NCHD Grades ==
Structured postgraduate medical training in Ireland is provided by the medical postgraduate training bodies who are accredited by the Medical Council of Ireland. Postgraduate training is specifically designed to address the needs of junior doctors who have successfully completed their internship. It provides a career pathway towards achieving specialist registration. The career path for a doctor trained in Ireland ideally should follow structured training route from the point of entry to medical school to certification as a specialist (e.g. GP; Orthopaedic Surgeon; Gastroenterologist, Pathologist, Obstetrician, Public Health Specialist etc.). NCHDs are graded by seniority and time since graduation from medical school. These grades are:

- intern (Post-Graduate year 1)
- senior house officer (Post-Graduate year 2–3)
- registrar/specialist registrar (Post-Graduate year 4+)
- Fellow (Post-Graduate year variable)

After completion of specialist registrar training, doctors are qualified to take up consultant posts.

== See also ==
- Consultant (medicine)
- Fellowship (medicine)
- Foundation doctor
- Medical resident work hours
- Modernising Medical Careers
- Physician training
- Post graduate year annotation (PGY)
- Postdoctoral researcher
- Residency (medicine)
- Senior house officer
