= MTAS =

MTAS may refer to:

- Medical Training Application Service
- The railway company Malmtrafikk
- Ericsson's Multimedia Application Server Ericsson MTAS
