= Deanery (NHS) =

UK medical education organization

An NHS deanery is a regional organisation responsible for postgraduate medical and dental training, within the structure of the National Health Service (NHS) in Scotland, Wales and Northern Ireland. In 2013, restructuring of the NHS in England led to its deaneries being incorporated into new bodies, known as Local Education and Training Boards (LETBs), that have taken over these functions.

== Role ==
Each deanery is responsible for coordinating postgraduate medical and dental education within a given region, to standards that are set by the General Medical Council and the General Dental Council. Deaneries are each advised by a Specialty Training Committee (STC), which includes consultants.

Postgraduate medical education begins as doctors start their initial Foundation Programme (F1/F2) jobs, where they are closely supervised and their progress is monitored across two years of training. The recruitment of doctors into Speciality Training Programmes is managed by deaneries. Once a doctor accepts a post on a training programme the deanery allocates specific jobs, arranges educational supervision and provides the assessment of whether the doctors in training have demonstrated sufficient progress.

== Criticisms ==
Deaneries have been criticised in the past for not providing accurate and detailed information to applicants who have no alternative methods of finding employment within the UK, in particular for failing reliably to tell applicants exactly when and where jobs will start, what hours will be, and what their salary will be. The BMA have observed "It's hard to imagine another profession where you could start salaried employment without knowing how much you'll be paid in six months' time. That's been the reality for junior doctors for years, but it may be about to change."

As of June 2008, the Employment Agency Standards Inspectorate have ruled that deaneries should be legally classified as employment agencies, which calls into question the legality of existing recruitment processes. This has led Remedy UK to call for junior doctors, who are currently employed on a series of short-term contracts, to be given a single unified contract covering the whole process.

== EU applicants ==
Recent changes in UK legislation mean that deaneries must give preference to applicants from the UK or the European Union. This is likely over the medium term to change the make-up of the hospital registrar workforce, in which over recent years candidates from developing countries in Asia and Africa have been strongly represented.

== See also ==
- Conference of Postgraduate Medical Deans
