= NCHD =

NCHD may refer to:

- National Commission for Human Development
- Non-consultant hospital doctor
