= David A. Ferenbach =

Scottish academic

- Education: University of Edinburgh (MBChB; BSc Hons Pathology; PhD)
- Known for: Macrophage role in acute kidney injury; Aging and senescence in kidney disease; Senescence-targeted anti‑fibrotic therapies
- Awards: Clinical Training Fellowship (Kidney Research UK); Research Fellowship (Medical Research Scotland); Wellcome Trust Intermediate Clinical Fellowship; MRC Senior Clinical Fellowship
- Scientific career
- Fields: Nephrology; Immunology; Regenerative medicine; Cellular senescence
- Workplaces: University of Edinburgh (MRC Centre for Inflammation Research)
- Doctoral advisor: Jeremy Hughes; David Kluth
- Website: https://inflammation-research.ed.ac.uk/research/research-groups/professor-david-ferenbach

David A. Ferenbach is a Scottish medical researcher. He specializes in renal medicine. As of 2023, he holds a Personal Chair of Regenerative Nephrology at the University of Edinburgh, and is a fellow of the Royal College of Physicians of Edinburgh.

== Biography ==
David Arthur Ferenbach was born and raised in Edinburgh, Scotland, the eldest of five children. He attended George Watson's College in Edinburgh and matriculated at the University of Edinburgh, graduating with a Bachelor of Medicine, Bachelor of Surgery (MBChB), alongside an intercalated Bachelor of Science with honours in Pathology. Following medical school, he completed house officer rotations in Edinburgh. He then moved to Glasgow, working as a Senior House Officer on the Royal Infirmary medical rotation and later as an SHO3 in Renal Medicine at the Glasgow Royal and Western Infirmaries.

Ferenbach pursued his doctoral research in Nephrology at the University of Edinburgh under the supervision of Professor Jeremy Hughes and Dr David Kluth. His PhD was supported by a Clinical Training Fellowship from Kidney Research UK (2005–2008), followed by a Research Fellowship from Medical Research Scotland (2008–2009). He was appointed Clinical Lecturer in Nephrology at the University of Edinburgh in 2011. In 2013, he was awarded a Wellcome Trust Intermediate Clinical Fellowship, during which he conducted research at Harvard Medical School and Edinburgh. In 2022, he received an MRC Senior Clinical Fellowship to investigate senescent cell signalling pathways. He was promoted to Personal Chair of Regenerative Nephrology at the University of Edinburgh in April 2023. He is also a fellow in the Royal College of Physicians of Edinburgh.

== Research ==
Ferenbach's research centers on the mechanisms of acute kidney injury, the role of macrophages in renal repair, the effects of ageing and cellular senescence on kidney disease progression, and the development of senescence‑targeted anti‑fibrotic therapies. As of 2025, he has authored over 37 peer‑reviewed articles and led multiple grants funded by the Medical Research Council, ARGENX BV, and Kidney Research UK. Ferenbach's work has been featured in outlets such as Medical Xpress and SciTechDaily.

== Selected publications ==
- O'Sullivan, Eoin D.; Mylonas, Katie J.; Xin, Cuiyan; Baird, David P.; Carvalho, Cyril; Docherty, Marie‑Helena; Campbell, Ross A.; Matchett, Kylie P.; Waddell, Scott H.; Walker, Alexander D. (31 May 2023). "Indian Hedgehog release from TNF‑activated renal epithelia drives local and remote organ fibrosis". Science Translational Medicine. 15 (698) eabn0736. doi:10.1126/scitranslmed.abn0736. PMC 11977576. PMID 37256934.
- Ferreira-Gonzalez, Sofia; Man, Tak Yung; Esser, Hannah; Aird, Rhona; Kilpatrick, Alastair M.; Rodrigo‑Torres, Daniel; Younger, Nicholas; Campana, Lara; Gadd, Victoria L.; Dwyer, Benjamin (7 December 2022). "Senolytic treatment preserves biliary regenerative capacity lost through cellular senescence during cold storage" (PDF). Science Translational Medicine. 14 (674) eabj4375. doi:10.1126/scitranslmed.abj4375. PMID 36475903.
- O'Sullivan, Eoin D.; Mylonas, Katie J.; Bell, Rachel; Carvalho, Cyril; Baird, David P.; Campbell, Ross A.; Docherty, Marie‑Helena; Mylonas, Hannah (22 November 2022). "Single‑cell analysis of senescent epithelia reveals targetable mechanisms promoting fibrosis". JCI Insight. 7 (22) e154124. doi:10.1172/jci.insight.154124. PMC 9746814. PMID 36509292.
- Campbell, Ross A.; Docherty, Marie‑Helena; Ferenbach, David A.; Mylonas, Katie J. (1 June 2021). "The Role of Ageing and Parenchymal Senescence on Macrophage Function and Fibrosis". Frontiers in Immunology. 12 700790. doi:10.3389/fimmu.2021.700790. PMC 8248495. PMID 34220864.
