= Remedy UK =

Remedy UK logo

Remedy UK was a pressure group representing junior doctors in the United Kingdom. The organisation was set up by four junior doctors in 2007 to campaign against UK government-led medical training reforms known as Modernising Medical Careers(MMC) and their implementation through the Medical Training Application Service (MTAS). Remedy UK was created in response to what was perceived to be an insufficiently robust response by the official doctors' trade union, the BMA, and professional associations (Royal Colleges of Medicine).

Remedy UK had over 13,000 members and campaigns as a grassroots doctors' organisation. It was supported by optional subscriptions from its members.

After Remedy UK lost an application for Judicial Review in May 2007, the BMA announced that it would not seek to recover its legal costs. An Early Day Motion in the UK Parliament was signed by 50 MPs that urged the Secretary of State not to pursue costs against Remedy UK.

Remedy UK announced its closure on 15 May 2012, saying it had been "unable to sustain the management and leadership that an effective Remedy needs."

== Campaigns ==
Remedy UK mounted several high-profile campaigns against Modernising Medical Careers.

1. Early Day Motion - an Early day motion explicitly backing RemedyUK's concerns about MMC and MTAS was signed by 127 Members of Parliament
2. March in March - Remedy UK organised a march that took place in London on 17 March 2007 from the headquarters of the Royal College of Physicians to the offices of the Royal College of Surgeons of England. Thousands of junior doctors turned out to protest. A parallel protest was organised on the same day in Glasgow.
3. Mass Lobby of Parliament - on 24 April 2007 Remedy UK organised a mass lobby of the UK parliament in Westminster attended by hundreds of doctors. This aimed to directly pressure individual MPs and to raise awareness of the issues surrounding recent reforms to medical training in the UK.
4. Judicial Review - Remedy UK launched a judicial review in May 2007 challenging the legality of MTAS and MMC in court. Justice Goldring did not rule in favour of Remedy UK but in his summary described the reforms as "disastrous" and suggested that individual doctors cases should be open to scrutiny by employment tribunals.

MMC & MTAS march in London
