= Conference of Postgraduate Medical Deans =

The Conference of Postgraduate Medical Deans provides a forum for postgraduate deans of the National Health Service of the United Kingdom to discuss current issues, share best practice and agree a consistent and equitable approach to medical training in all deaneries.

It also acts as a focal point for contact between the postgraduate medical deans and other organisations, for example:

- Medical royal colleges
- General Medical Council
- British Medical Association
- Academy of Medical Royal Colleges
- Council of Heads of Medical Schools
- Postgraduate Medical Education and Training Board
- Health departments for postgraduate medical and dental education matters

It has an office in Red Lion Square in the same building as the Royal College of Anaesthetists and the Academy of Medical Royal Colleges which provides administrative support.
