= Resident doctor (United Kingdom) =

UK medical practitioner under postgraduate training

In the United Kingdom, a resident doctor, known until 2024 as a junior doctor, is a qualified medical practitioner who is either engaged in postgraduate training or employed in a non-training post. The period of being a resident doctor starts when they qualify as a medical practitioner following graduation with a Bachelor of Medicine, Bachelor of Surgery degree and start the UK Foundation Programme. It culminates in a post as a consultant, a general practitioner (GP), or becoming a SAS doctor (Specialty, Associate Specialist, or Specialist doctor).

The term resident doctor currently incorporates the grades of foundation doctor, core trainee (in some specialties, such as surgery, medicine, and psychiatry), and specialty registrar. Before 2007, it included the grades of pre-registration house officer, senior house officer and specialist registrar. During this time, resident doctors will do postgraduate examinations to become members of a medical royal college relevant to the specialty in which they are training, for example membership of the Royal College of Physicians for doctors specialising in internal medicine, membership of the Royal College of Surgeons for doctors specialising in surgery or membership of the Royal College of General Practitioners for doctors specialising in family medicine. Doctors typically may be resident doctors for 8–20 years, and this may be extended by doing research towards a higher degree, for example a Doctor of Philosophy or Doctor of Medicine degree. In England, there are around 71,000 resident doctors.

== Replacement of the term "junior doctor" ==
There had been controversy about the historical term "junior doctor", with many organisations and individuals voicing concern that it created misconceptions about their work and did not do justice to the skills and experience acquired by these doctors, many of whom have been working for several years.

The British Medical Association (BMA) voted to discontinue the term "junior doctor" from all forms of communication at their 2023 annual representative meeting (ARM). The motion was presented to the BMA Representative Body by Dr Sai Pillarisetti, a foundation year doctor. After a debate and vote of members, it was passed in full and made BMA policy. References to junior doctors in BMA policies and communications are due to change to "resident doctors" from September 2024.

An independent report for Health Education England (HEE) authored by Prof Scarlett McNally found more than 75% of those surveyed found the term "junior doctor" inappropriate, and almost half thought "trainee" should be avoided. The report recommended a shift towards "postgraduate doctors" instead.

In December 2023, then Health Secretary Victoria Atkins faced criticism for using the term "doctors in training" as an alternative to "junior doctor" in a TV interview on BBC Breakfast. This was followed by a spokesperson for the Department of Health and Social Care stating they respected the profession's decision to move away from the term "junior doctor".

In July 2024, as part of a deal between the BMA and the UK government to settle a long-running dispute about junior doctors' pay in the NHS in England, it was announced that the term "junior doctor" would be changed to "resident doctor" within the English NHS. This deal was accepted by the BMA on 16 September 2024, and the name change took effect on 18 September 2024. A similar agreement was made between BMA Scotland and the Scottish government covering NHS Scotland in October 2024, with this agreement coming into effect in November 2024. Separately, the Northern Ireland executive agreed to start using the term "resident doctor" in Health and Social Care (Northern Ireland) from the same date as in England, while the Welsh government agreed to start using the term in NHS Wales from November 2024.

== Working hours ==
In Europe and the US, there has been some reduction of the working hours of doctors who are in postgraduate training, in line with recommendations and legislation aimed at improving patient safety and doctors' working conditions. In 1991, the government, the NHS and the British Medical Association (BMA) agreed a package of measures on working hours, pay and conditions which was called the New Deal for Junior Doctors. The doctors' duty hours, which were felt to be excessive, were reduced to a maximum average of 56 hours' actual work and 72 hours' on call duty per week, although the change was not enforced until 1 December 2000. The European Working Time Directive (EWTD) sets out minimum health and safety requirements for the organisation of working time. The EWTD required the average working week to fall to 48 hours or fewer by 2009.

The shortening of resident doctors' working hours had implications for how training programmes are organised, especially for specialties such as surgery, where there was a tradition of maximising the hours of experience. Most studies that have looked at a reduction of resident doctors' working hours have found either a beneficial or neutral impact in terms of measures of patient safety, clinical outcomes and postgraduate training.

The reduction in number of hours worked by resident doctors is one of the factors leading to blurring distinctions between them and other clinical professions, such as nurse practitioners who also perform complex tasks.

== Migration ==
An Organisation for Economic Co-operation and Development survey in December 2015 showed that 35.4% of NHS doctors, 34,000, were born abroad compared with 5% in Italy, 10.7% in Germany and 19.5% in France. The UK was the second highest exporter of doctors, second only to Germany, with 17,000 British doctors working in other OECD countries. These figures are for all doctors in the NHS, not just resident doctors.

According to the Career Destination Report published by the UK Foundation Programme Office in 2019, an increasing number of UK resident doctors are seeking to take up work abroad. A report by the General Medical Council described a number of "push" and "pull" factors, including seeking a better work-life balance and wanting to take advantage of other opportunities abroad. Most doctors who complete foundation training do eventually return to specialty training in the UK within three years.

== Modernising medical careers ==
In 2005, postgraduate medical training was significantly changed in the Modernising Medical Careers programme. A two-year Foundation Programme was introduced for newly qualified doctors, the number of years of postgraduate training changed in some specialties, and doctors needed to decide which specialty to follow sooner after graduation.

There were later initiatives to engage resident doctors in NHS leadership; resident doctors are seen as essential to the drives to achieve efficiency savings in the NHS since 2010.

NHS Medical Career Grades
	Old System		New System (Modernising Medical Careers)	
Year 1:	Pre-registration House Officer (PRHO) 1 year		Foundation Programme: 2 years	
Year 2:	Senior House Officer (SHO) a minimum of 2 years, although often more.		Foundation Programme: 2 years	
Year 3:	Senior House Officer (SHO) a minimum of 2 years, although often more.		Specialty Registrar (StR) in a hospital specialty: 6–8 years	Specialty Registrar (StR) in general practice: 3 years
Year 4:	Specialist Registrar: 4–6 years	GP Registrar: 1 year	Specialty Registrar (StR) in a hospital specialty: 6–8 years	Specialty Registrar (StR) in general practice: 3 years
Year 5:	Specialist Registrar: 4–6 years	General Practitioner total time in training: 4 years	Specialty Registrar (StR) in a hospital specialty: 6–8 years	Specialty Registrar (StR) in general practice: 3 years
Years 6-8:	Specialist Registrar: 4–6 years	General Practitioner total time in training: 4 years	Specialty Registrar (StR) in a hospital specialty: 6–8 years	General Practitioner total time in training: 5 years
Year 9:	Consultant total time in training: minimum 7—9 years	General Practitioner total time in training: 4 years	Consultant total time in training: 8—10 years*	General Practitioner total time in training: 5 years
Optional	Training may be extended by pursuing medical research (usually two-three years), usually with clinical duties as well		Training may be extended by obtaining an Academic Clinical Fellowship for research, or a Clinical Fellowship for sub-specialisation. *due to competition for consultant posts, it may take longer than 8 years to gain Consultant status .	

== Pay and conditions ==
The NHS Careers website stated in 2025:

As a resident doctor you’ll earn a basic salary, plus pay for any hours over 40 per week, a 37 per cent enhancement for working nights, a weekend allowance for any work at the weekend, an availability allowance if you are required to be available on-call, and other potential pay premia.

In Foundation training, you will earn a basic salary of £38,831 to £44,439 (from 1 April 2025).

If you’re a doctor starting your specialist training in 2025 your basic salary will be £52,656 to £73,992.

— NHS Careers

The basic salaries outlined are defined for a contract of 40 hours per week. Salaries are increased proportionally for any extra hours worked on average per week. Any hours outside "social" hours, namely between 9pm and 7am, are supplemented by a 37% enhanced rate. Weekend duty is paid as a percentage bonus, up to 10% of the basic salary for working alternate (1 in 2) weekends. Other bonuses are also available for being non-resident on-call (being not physically on site, but available to answer calls or come in to hospital if necessary), for recruitment into academia and undersubscribed specialties, and for doctors living and working in London. In 2015, NHS Employers reported the total annual earnings for foundation doctors in England averaged just over £36,000. While the basic starting salary for doctors in specialty training was £30,002, NHS Employers were reporting that average earnings in this group of doctors was nearly £53,000.

In 2013, graduates who had studied medicine or dentistry were the most likely to be employed and had the highest average gross annual pay when compared to graduates who studied other subjects. In 2015, the average starting salary of resident doctors was the third-highest of all graduate starting salaries, after dentistry and chemical engineering. In 2016, it was reported that after 10 years of employment, medicine graduates had the highest salary of all degrees. Research conducted in December 2014 showed that across a range of other jobs, almost a third of graduate programmes at Britain's best known and leading employers paid starting salaries of more than £35,000; however, 83% of these leading employers reported that they were recruiting for jobs in London where salaries are higher, whereas NHS salaries are set on a nationwide basis, with doctors in London given an additional payment (£2,162 as of 2013) known as London weighting to compensate for increased cost of living.

Since 2007, resident doctors have been receiving below inflation salary rises. The Independent Review Body on Doctors' and Dentists' Remuneration (DDRB) takes evidence from a range of sources and makes recommendations around pay; in 2015, they recommended a 1% pay increase. In 2005, the average starting earnings (salary plus bonuses) for a medical graduate was £32,086. In an inflationary environment, all wage-earners, including doctors, may find the buying power of their income becomes less; some describe this as a real-terms cut in pay of 15% between 2007 and 2014. In 2019, the British Medical Association came to an agreement with NHS England to settle for a guaranteed 2% annual pay rise until 2023.

In 2023, resident doctors in England initiated their longest-ever strike, protesting against pay disparities within the National Health Service (NHS). The strike, which began on 13 July 2023, continued for five days and led to the postponement of appointments and disruptions in healthcare services. While emergency care remained accessible, patients were advised to seek alternative options for minor health concerns. The ongoing dispute revolved around the demand for a 35% pay increase to address below-inflation salary increments over the past 15 years. The impact on patient care, NHS costs, and waiting list reduction was a matter of significant concern.

=== Expenses ===
Doctors pay professional annual fees to maintain registration with the General Medical Council and medical indemnity cover. Resident doctors also incur costs associated with training courses, preparing for and sitting exams and college membership; training can be associated with £420-£3,000 of professional fees annually, depending on stage of training and level of income. English students embarking on a medical degree could in 2015 expect to pay £40,000 on university tuition fees alone. Student loans are available to meet these costs, with repayment starting as soon as individuals begin working as resident doctors. University tuition in Scotland is free for students ordinarily resident in Scotland, and grants and loans are available to help with living costs.

Changes to working patterns of doctors meant there was no longer a requirement for first-year resident doctors to be resident, and from 2008 free accommodation was no longer provided by employers. The British Medical Association said that this amounted to a £4,800 annual pay cut for those who might have previously lived at the hospital rather than independently, but the numbers of doctors involved was not clear. Ann Keen, Labour Parliamentary Under-Secretary for Health Services, stated: "The provision of free accommodation for foundation year 1 doctors who are on call at night is dependent on the contract of employment of the resident doctor, which is for agreement locally. The Junior Doctors' Terms and Conditions of Service continue to provide that if a doctor is contractually required to live in hospital accommodation no charges should be made for the accommodation provided."

=== Prospects ===
The NHS Careers website states:

Specialty doctors and specialist payscale

If you’re working as a specialty doctor you’ll earn a basic salary of £61,542 to £99,216. If you are a specialist grade doctor you'll earn a basic salary of £100,870 to £111,441 (from 1 April 2025).

Consultants

As a consultant from 1 April 2025, you'll earn a basic salary of £109,725 to £145,478 per year, depending on the length of your service. You may apply for local Clinical Excellence Awards and national Clinical Impact Awards (previously known as Clinical Excellence Awards). This is a competitive process which takes into account work that you do over and above delivering your basic job requirements. In addition, if you take on extra responsibilities, for example in management or education, you may expect to be paid more.

Consultants can also supplement their salary by working in private practice if they wish. The opportunities available will depend on their specialty areas and the time they wish to spend on this outside of their NHS contracted hours.

General practitioners

There are two contractual options for GPs. They can be:

1) independent contractors who are in charge of running their own practices as business either alone or in partnerships. They have autonomy in how services are delivered according to their contract with NHS England. In England, these GPs have increasing responsibility for the commissioning of hospital services for the community

2) salaried GPs who are employees of independent contractor practices or directly employed by primary care organisations. From 1 April 2025, the pay range for salaried GPs is £76,038 to £114,743.

=== Pension scheme ===
Resident doctors may pay into the NHS Pension Scheme, which from April 2015 has been a Career Average Revalued Earnings (CARE) scheme. The 2015 scheme involves paying towards a pension that will be based on the average of a member's pensionable earnings throughout their whole career, with a revaluation of active members benefits in line with the consumer price index plus 1.5 per cent per annum. The 1995–2008 scheme is closed to new entrants.

=== Contract dispute in England ===
Since 2012, NHS Employers and the BMA had been in negotiation towards a new contract for resident doctors. These talks ran into serious problems when the Secretary of State for Health, Jeremy Hunt, appeared willing to impose items from the Conservative 2015 election manifesto upon resident doctors in England.

On 12 January 2016, resident doctors in England took part in the first general strike across the NHS, the first such industrial action in 40 years. Emergency care was still provided. There have been claims that the medical director of NHS England, Professor Sir Bruce Keogh, has used performance target levels to justify and encourage NHS Trusts to declare an emergency situation, forcing resident doctors to work despite the strike, a move which the BMA has condemned.

In September 2015, Hunt proposed new contracts for resident doctors that would scrap overtime rates for work between 7am and 10pm on every day except Sunday while increasing their basic pay in a move that Hunt said would be cost neutral, a claim the BMA says NHS Employers have been unable to support with robust data. In response, the BMA called for a strike, the first since the 1970s. The strike vote started on 5 November. In November 2015, the BMA balloted more than 37,700 of their members in response to Hunt's contract proposals; 76% of eligible doctors voted, with 99.6% of doctors voting for action short of strike and 98% voting for all out strike. In November 2015, Hunt said he would offer a basic pay increase of 11% but still remove compensation for longer hours. On 19 November 2015, the result of the BMA strike ballot was announced, with more than 99% in favour of industrial action short of a strike, and 98% voting for full strike action. Hunt said the strike was "very disappointing", but declined the appeal for arbitration. He was criticised for failing to answer MPs' questions about the strike, with his deputy claiming he was too busy preparing for the strike. Hunt eventually agreed to discussions overseen by Acas. After five days of talks between the government and BMA, Hunt withdrew his threat to impose a new contract without agreement, and the strike action that had been planned for December was suspended. The first day of strike action was called off hours before it was due to start (too late to avoid some disruption), with later days suspended.

On 24 December 2015, Dr Johann Malawana, leader of the BMA's junior doctors committee (JDC), gave a 4 January deadline for the talks to yield an acceptable outcome, or industrial action would be announced. An agreement was not reached by this deadline, and so the BMA announced that a strike would go ahead, blaming "the government's continued failure to address resident doctors' concerns about the need for robust contractual safeguards on safe working, and proper recognition for those working unsocial hours". The first day of the strike went ahead on 12 January. Resident doctors again withdrew their labour for routine care on 10 February 2016, leading to the cancellation of around 3,000 elective operations.

=== Rest breaks ===
In a case involving University Hospitals of Derby and Burton NHS Foundation Trust in July 2019, the Court of Appeal decided that the trust had breached the 2002 contract for resident doctors because their hours and rest periods had been underestimated by commercial software over some years. The case will affect other NHS employers and substantial arrears will be due.

== Risks to patients ==
The period in August where there was a large changeover of hospital staff has sometimes been dubbed the "killing season" (due to a perception that there is an associated rise in the number of patient deaths). In 2009, research looking at emergency admissions to hospitals in England established that a small but statistically significant increase in patient mortality occurred during August. The limited data was collected retrospectively over an 8-year period, comparing two week-long blocks (one week before commencement, one week after commencement). The methodology meant that drawing firm conclusions was unwise with correlation not implying causation. In the month when resident doctors start working, when other factors are adjusted for, patients had a 6% increase in mortality. For patients admitted as an emergency who were not requiring surgery or suffering from cancer, the mortality rate increased by 7.86%.

Other concerns have been raised regarding mortality following admission to hospital at a weekend. A research paper published in 2012 looked retrospectively at data from 2009; the study observed an increase in 30-day mortality for people admitted to hospital on Saturday and Sunday, compared to mid-week days. The risk of dying in a hospital on Saturday or Sunday was actually less than on a weekday. The data in the study did not enable the authors to describe the cause of this so-called weekend effect. Subsequently, there has been considerable speculation around whether the availability of consultants was a factor. The authors of the paper have also openly criticised the conclusions drawn by the government and popular media on the paper, saying that to draw such conclusions as to associated decreased weekend staffing levels to increased mortality at 30 days post-admission would be "rash and misleading".

Health Education England produces reports on NHS trusts under "enhanced monitoring" by the General Medical Council, because of concerns from trainees. Twenty of these were analysed by the Health Service Journal in 2020. Bolton NHS Foundation Trust and Barking, Havering and Redbridge University Hospitals NHS Trust featured prominently. Reports included consultants leaving resident doctors with insufficient support, bullying, reluctance to report concerns and IT problems. It has the power to withdraw trainees from trusts but this has been used only once since the start of 2019.

== See also ==
- Residency (medicine)
- Foundation doctor
- Specialty registrar
- Bullying in medicine
- List of health and medical strikes
- Early career doctor
