= Liam Donaldson =

British doctor (born 1949)

Sir Liam Donaldson FRCSE FRCP FRCPE FMedSci FRCA
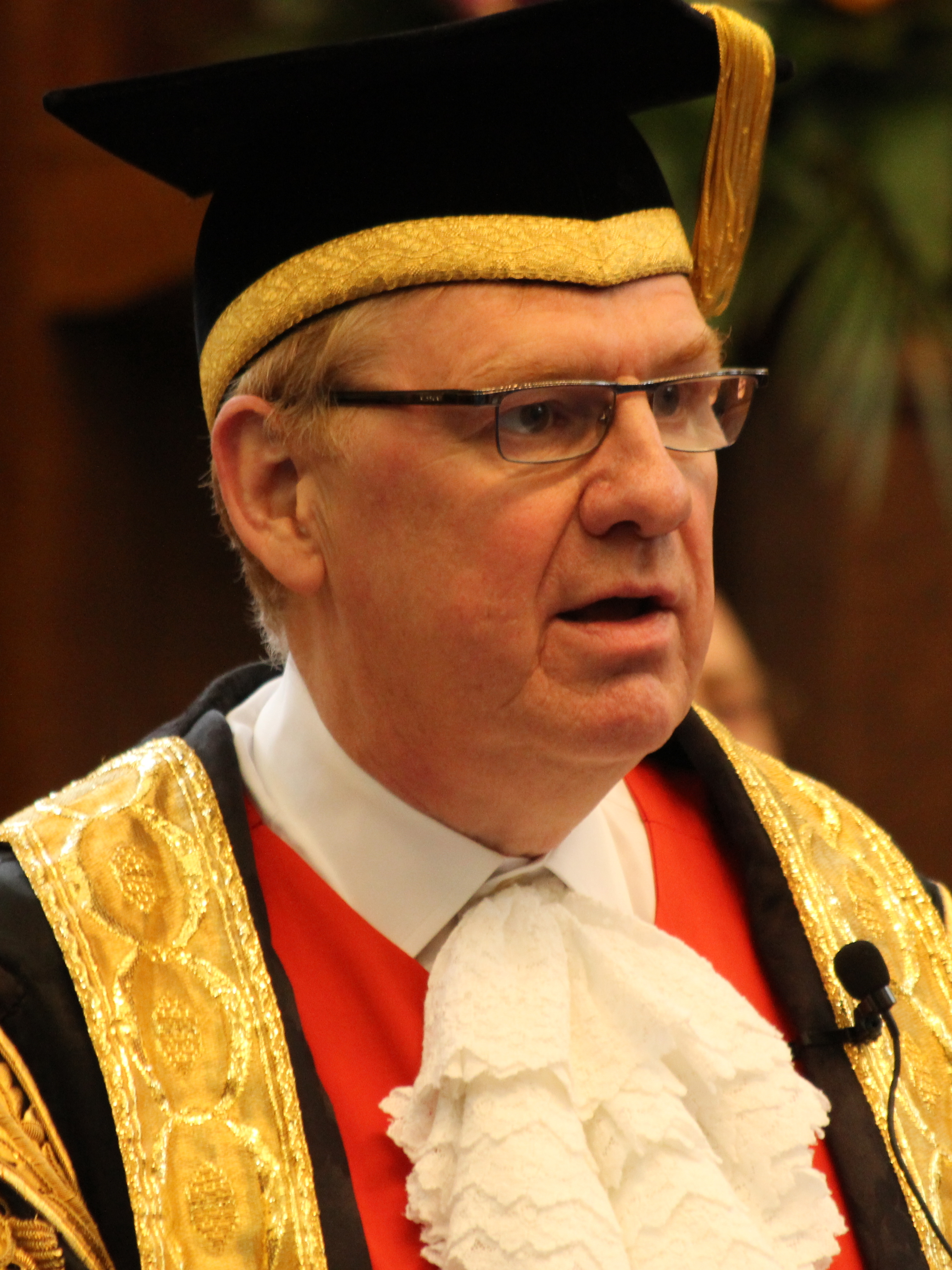
- Donaldson as Chancellor of Newcastle University in 2011

Chief Medical Officer for England
- In office 1 January 1998 – 31 May 2010
- Preceded by: Sir Kenneth Calman
- Succeeded by: Dame Sally Davies

Chair of the World Alliance for Patient Safety
- Incumbent
- Assumed office 2004

Chancellor of Newcastle University
- In office 1 August 2009 – 31 July 2019
- Preceded by: Chris Patten
- Succeeded by: Imtiaz Dharker

Personal details
- Born: 3 May 1949 (age 77) Middlesbrough, England
- Education: University of Bristol; University of Birmingham university of Leicester
- Profession: Physician surgeon

Sir Liam Joseph Donaldson (born 3 May 1949) is a British physician. He was formerly the Chief Medical Officer for England, being the 15th occupant of the post since it was established in 1855. As such, he was principal advisor to the United Kingdom Government on health matters and one of the most senior officials in the National Health Service (NHS).

In December 2009 it was announced that he planned to retire from this role in May 2010, although he said that, if the influenza pandemic should unexpectedly worsen, he would have postponed his retirement. On 1 July 2010 he was appointed the Chairman of the Independent Monitoring Board overseeing the polio eradication initiative coordinated by the World Health Organization.

In the 2002 New Year Honours List he was awarded a knighthood in recognition of his achievements in health and health care. Between 2009 and 2019 he served two terms as Chancellor of Newcastle University.

== Career ==
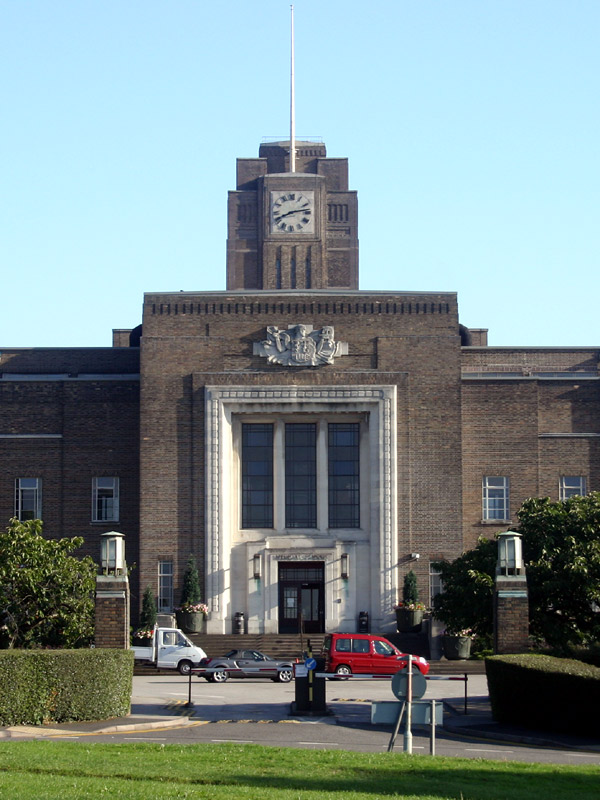
Birmingham University Medical School

Donaldson qualified in medicine from the University of Bristol in 1972, and he did his two six-month pre-registration house jobs at the Bristol Royal Infirmary. He graduated with an MSc degree in anatomy from the University of Birmingham in 1976.

Donaldson was appointed as Chief Medical Officer in 1998. Between 1994 and 1998 he was Regional Director for the NHS Region of Northern and Yorkshire, and prior to that Regional Medical Officer and Regional Director of Public Health for the Northern Regional Health Authority. He began his career as a surgeon before training in public health.

=== Academic and other posts ===
Donaldson is visiting professor in the University of Leicester's Department of Epidemiology and Public Health, and also holds an honorary Chair of Applied Epidemiology at Newcastle University. In August 2009 he became Chancellor of Newcastle University, replacing Chris Patten, who stood down after 10 years in office. Donaldson retired from this role in the summer of 2019.

He is also Chair of the World Alliance for Patient Safety, which was established by the Director-General of the World Health Organization in October 2004.

=== Achievements ===
As a result of his reports as Chief Medical Officer, Donaldson has had a marked effect on policy and legislation in a wide range of areas including stem cell research, quality and safety of health care, infectious disease control, patient empowerment, clinical performance, temperance legislation, medical regulation, and organ and tissue retention.

Donaldson has degrees from:

- the University of Bristol (MB ChB, 1972), where he attended Wills Hall;
- the University of Birmingham (MSc, Anatomy, 1976); and
- the University of Leicester (MD, 1981), and he was also a lecturer in the Department of Community Health, and subsequently Senior Lecturer in Epidemiology for four years.

He has also been awarded honorary doctorates by:

- the University of Huddersfield (DSc, 1998);
- the University of Bristol (MD, 1999);
- the University of Leicester;
- Cranfield University (2000);
- the University of Portsmouth;
- the University of East Anglia (ScD, 2003);
- the University of Teesside (DSc, 2004);
- the University of York (2004);
- the University of Birmingham (DSc, 2005);
- the University of Nottingham (DM, 2005);
- De Montfort University Leicester (DSc, 2005);
- the University of Sunderland (Doctor of Science, 2006);
- the University of Hull (Doctor of Science, 2006); and
- Newcastle University (Doctor of Humanities and Sciences, 2019).

Donaldson is:

- a Fellow of the Royal College of Surgeons of Edinburgh (FRCS(Ed));
- a Fellow of the Faculty of Public Health Medicine (FFPHM);
- a Fellow of the Royal College of Physicians (FRCP);
- a Fellow of the Royal College of Physicians of Edinburgh (FRCP(Ed));
- a Fellow of the Academy of Medical Sciences (FMedSci); and
- a Fellow of the Royal College of Anaesthetists (FRCA).

Other honours include:

- the post of Queen's Honorary Physician during the mid-1990s;
- the College Medal by the Royal College of Surgeons of Edinburgh, awarded in June 2000;
- presenting the Bradshaw Lecture, Royal College of Physicians, 2002;
- receiving a knighthood in the New Year Honours in 2002;
- receiving the Picker Award for Excellence, in recognition of his achievements in the field of patient-centred care and patient safety; and
- receiving the World Health Executive Forum Distinguished Leader Award.

=== Modernising Medical Careers ===
Donaldson was involved in devising the Modernising Medical Careers (MMC) system and the Medical Training Application Service (MTAS). This has been very controversial since its inception, with officials from the DH proclaiming success although it has been outrightly rejected by a large group of trainees and consultants. It champions competence rather than excellence and substantially reduces the length of the training programme required to become a consultant.

In an unprecedented demonstration against this system, around 12,000 junior doctors marched against MMC and the associated MTAS in March 2007. Subsequently, Prof. Alan Crockard the National Director of MMC resigned stating that the project had "lacked clear leadership from the top for a very long time". A colleague of Crockard, Prof. Shelley Heard, also resigned. The BMA and senior doctors have called repeatedly for his resignation in this matter.

=== Britain's drinking problem ===
In March 2009, to combat what he referred to as the country's drinking problem or 'passive drinking', Donaldson recommended setting a minimum price per unit of alcohol at 50p and tightening licensing laws. Despite Prime Minister Gordon Brown's opposition to the move, Donaldson said he would continue to push his case, just as he had with the successful ban on smoking in public places.

== Controversy ==
Donaldson angered civil liberties campaigners, GPs, and the BMA's spokesman for IT in December 2006 by recommending that GPs should forward letters from patients, requesting that personal medical data not be uploaded to the Spine centralised NHS database, to Health Secretary Patricia Hewitt.

== Publications ==
Liam Donaldson is co-author of a standard text book of public health, a history of the Chief Medical Officer of England and over 130 papers in peer review journals. He has also written a foreword for a book on clinical audit.

In his role as Chief Medical Officer, Donaldson has produced a number of major reports, including:

- Supporting doctors, protecting patients (1999)
- Stem cell research: Medical progress with responsibility (2000)
- An organisation with a memory (2000)
- The expert patient: a new approach to chronic disease management for the 21st century (2001)
- The removal, retention and use of human organs and tissue from post-mortem examination (2001)
- Getting ahead of the curve: a strategy for combating infectious diseases (2002)
- At least five a week: Evidence on the impact of physical activity and its relationship to health (2004)
- Good doctors, safer patients: Proposals to strengthen the system to assure and improve the performance of doctors and to protect the safety of patients (2006)
- Safety first (2006)
- Bearing good witness: Proposals for reforming the delivery of medical expert evidence in family law cases (2007)

His papers are now archived as one of the special collections of Newcastle University.

Government offices
Preceded by Kenneth Calman	Chief Medical Officer for Her Majesty's Government; 1998–2010	Succeeded by Sally Davies
Academic offices
Preceded by Chris Patten	Chancellor of Newcastle University; 2009–present	Succeeded by Incumbent
