= Patricia Hewitt =

British politician (born 1948)

The Right Honourable Dame Patricia Hewitt DBE FRSA
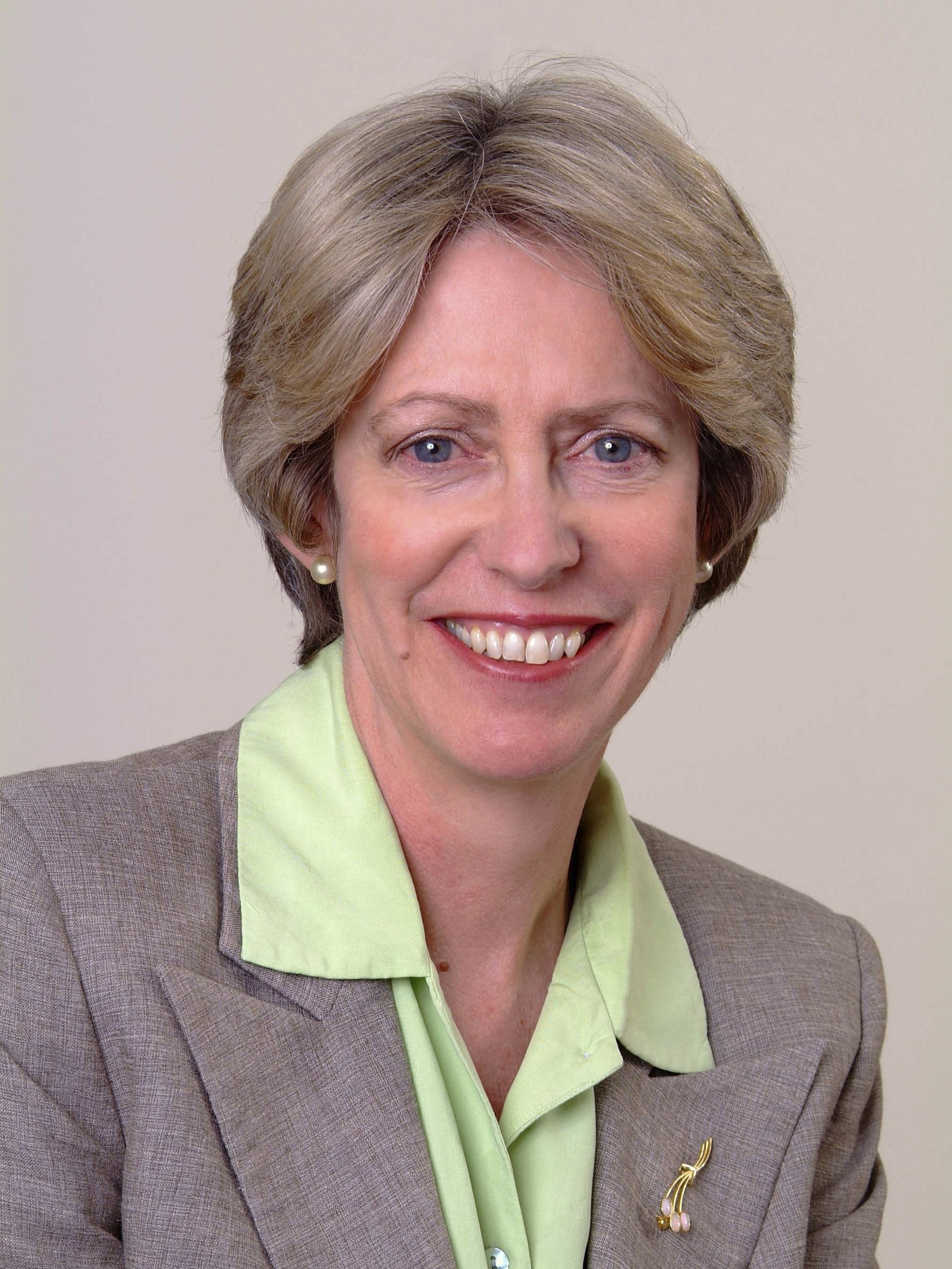
- Official portrait, 2006

Secretary of State for Health
- In office 6 May 2005 – 28 June 2007
- Prime Minister: Tony Blair
- Preceded by: John Reid
- Succeeded by: Alan Johnson

Secretary of State for Trade and Industry President of the Board of Trade
- In office 8 June 2001 – 6 May 2005
- Prime Minister: Tony Blair
- Preceded by: Stephen Byers
- Succeeded by: Alan Johnson

Minister for Women
- In office 8 June 2001 – 6 May 2005
- Prime Minister: Tony Blair
- Preceded by: The Baroness Jay of Paddington
- Succeeded by: Tessa Jowell

Minister of State for Small Business & E-Commerce
- In office 17 May 1999 – 8 June 2001
- Prime Minister: Tony Blair
- Preceded by: Ian McCartney
- Succeeded by: Douglas Alexander

Economic Secretary to the Treasury
- In office 27 July 1998 – 17 May 1999
- Prime Minister: Tony Blair
- Preceded by: Helen Liddell
- Succeeded by: Melanie Johnson

Member of Parliament for Leicester West
- In office 1 May 1997 – 12 April 2010
- Preceded by: Greville Janner
- Succeeded by: Liz Kendall

Personal details
- Born: Patricia Hope Hewitt; 2 December 1948 (age 77) Canberra, Australia
- Party: Labour
- Spouse(s): David Gibson-Watt (m. 1970; div. 1978) Bill Birtles (m. 1981; died 2020)
- Children: 2
- Relatives: Lenox Hewitt (father)
- Education: Australian National University; Newnham College, Cambridge

Dame Patricia Hope Hewitt (born 2 December 1948) is an Australian-born British government adviser and former politician, who was the Secretary of State for Health from 2005 to 2007. A member of the Labour Party, she had previously been the Secretary of State for Trade and Industry from 2001 to 2005.

Hewitt's political career began in the 1970s, as a high-profile left-winger and supporter of Tony Benn. She was even classified by MI5 as an alleged communist sympathiser. After nine years as General Secretary of the National Council for Civil Liberties, she became press secretary to Neil Kinnock, whom she assisted in the modernisation of the Labour Party. In 1997, she became the first female MP for Leicester West, a safe Labour seat in the East Midlands, which she represented for thirteen years.

In 2001 she joined Blair's cabinet, the first of the 1997 intake of MPs to do so, as President of the Board of Trade and Secretary of State for Trade and Industry, before becoming Health Secretary in 2005. During her tenure, the ban on smoking in public places became legally enforceable. In March 2010, Hewitt was suspended from the Parliamentary Labour Party over the question of political lobbying irregularities, alleged on the Channel 4 Dispatches programme.

She is a former school governor at the Kentish Town Primary School.

In November 2022, British Chancellor of the Exchequer, Jeremy Hunt, announced that Hewitt would serve in an advisory role to the then Conservative Government.

== Early life ==
Hewitt was born in Canberra, Australia. She is the daughter of Sir Lenox Hewitt, a leading Australian civil servant and later chairman of Qantas, and the former Hope Tillyard. Her maternal grandfather was entomologist Robert John Tillyard.

Hewitt was privately educated at Canberra Church of England Girls' Grammar School and the Australian National University. She then studied at Newnham College, Cambridge, where she graduated with a BA degree in English Literature (later promoted to an MA). She became a visiting fellow at Nuffield College, Oxford. She speaks French and is a keen gardener.

In 1970, Hewitt married David Julian Gibson-Watt, second son of David Gibson Watt, Conservative MP for Hereford, and Diana Hambro. The couple divorced in 1978. Originally a Conservative, by the time of her divorce she had moved to the left, becoming a committed feminist. MI5 classified her as a "Communist sympathiser" in the 1970s because of her relationship with William (Bill) Jack Birtles, a radical lawyer. In 1981, she married Birtles in Camden; they have a daughter (born September 1986) and a son (born February 1988). In 1971, she became Age Concern's Press and Public Relations Officer, before joining the National Council for Civil Liberties (now Liberty), initially as a women's rights officer in 1973, and for nine years from 1974 as the general secretary.

In 1990, the Council of Europe ruled that MI5 surveillance of both Hewitt and the NCCL legal officer, Harriet Harman, had breached the European Convention on Human Rights.

== Pre-Parliamentary career ==
Hewitt joined the Labour Party in the 1970, and was initially a follower of Tony Benn; she publicly condemned those left-wing MPs who abstained in the deputy leadership election of 1981, giving Denis Healey a narrow victory. She was selected as the Labour candidate for Leicester East at the 1983 general election, following the defection of the sitting Labour MP, Tom Bradley, to the Social Democratic Party. Bradley stood for the SDP at the election, but the Conservative candidate, Peter Bruinvels, won the seat, beating Hewitt by just 933 votes.

Following her defeat in Leicester, she became press secretary to the Leader of the Opposition, Neil Kinnock. In this role she was a key player in the first stages of the 'modernisation' of the Labour Party and, along with Clive Hollick, helped set up the Institute for Public Policy Research and was its deputy director 1989–1994.

Following Labour's defeat in 1992, Hewitt was asked by the new Labour leader, John Smith, to help establish the Commission on Social Justice, of which she became deputy chair. She became head of research with Andersen Consulting, remaining in the post during the period 1994–1997.

Hewitt was elected to the House of Commons as the first female MP for Leicester West at the 1997 general election, following the retirement of the Labour MP Greville Janner. She was elected with a majority of 12,864 and remained the constituency MP until stepping down in 2010. She made her maiden speech on 3 July 1997. Leicester West is a safe Labour seat, with a majority of 9,070 votes in the 2005 general election.

== Parliamentary career ==
In 1997, Hewitt was a member of the social security select committee for a year, before becoming a member of Tony Blair's government in his first reshuffle in 1998, as the Economic Secretary to the Treasury. She was promoted in 1999 to become a Minister of State for Small Business and E-Commerce at the Department of Trade and Industry, and created the Social Enterprise Unit for similar new companies. While in office Hewitt initiated a White Paper on telecommunications and broadcasting, jointly published by the DTI and DCMS; this proposed the merger of seven or more different regulators to create a single converged regulator, OFCOM. Hewitt was then responsible for appointing its first chairman, Lord Currie.

She joined the Blair Cabinet for the first time following the 2001 general election as the Secretary of State for Trade and Industry and Minister for Women and Equality. She spent four years in this post and was seen as a fairly effective Trade and Industry Secretary despite controversial policies affecting her own constituency. However, she was seen as lacking leadership, particularly on consumer issues. Hewitt was then moved sideways to Health Secretary in May 2005.

== Secretary of State for Trade and Industry ==
Hewitt became a member of the Privy Council in 2001 and was Secretary of State for Trade and Industry from June 2001 until May 2005. During her time at the DTI, Hewitt introduced the "say on pay" laws, which require public companies to hold an annual shareholders' vote on the Remuneration Committee report on senior executive pay.

Hewitt defended outsourcing public sector support jobs to countries such as India in May 2004, arguing that outsourcing supported poorer communities in India and opposing protectionist proposals.

In September 2005, a Judicial Review found Hewitt "guilty of unlawful sex discrimination" when she employed a female applicant for a DTI position ahead of a significantly stronger male candidate. The judge ruled that Malcolm Hanney had lost out to a candidate ranked third by the interview panel and that the failure to appoint him was "in breach of the code of practice for ministerial appointments to public bodies". Hewitt had quoted the Code of Practice on Public Appointments, which said: "Ministers will wish to balance boards in terms of diversity as well as skills and experience", although the panel had clearly stated that Mr Hanney was "much the strongest candidate". The DTI apologised and Hanney was awarded £17,967.17 costs. However, the appointment was not overturned, and Hewitt herself did not apologise and claimed not to have realised she had been in breach of the law. Rod Liddle, writing in The Times, juxtaposed Hewitt's claim with the fact that Hewitt's department was itself responsible for the Sex Discrimination Act, suggesting that she believed the purpose of sex discrimination legislation "was intended to be of benefit only to women", rather than "maltreated job applicants ... foolish enough to be born with a penis".

Hewitt was criticised for a 2003 report by the Women and Equality unit, which was run by Hewitt, in which it was suggested that there was a "real problem" with mothers who stayed at home to bring up their children.

== Secretary of State for Health ==
Hewitt was appointed Secretary of State for Health following the 2005 general election, having previously been tipped for the Work and Pensions department. She had a turbulent two years in office, during which several difficult issues arose, such as the controversy over the Medical Training Application Service computer system and her decision to allow women with early breast cancer to have access to trastuzumab (Herceptin), for which it was not at that time a licensed indication and in the absence of NICE guidance. However, she also achieved several pieces of Labour's 2005 manifesto legislation during her time in office, including persuading MPs to vote for a complete smoking ban in public places in England in 2006.

In April 2006, Hewitt made a speech in which she quoted the foreword to the 2014 NHS Annual Report by Nigel Crisp, the then current NHS chief executive, stating the NHS had had "its best year ever", and citing a reduction in waiting times for hospital treatment. However, this claim came at a time when thousands of jobs were being cut across the country, as a number of NHS trusts attempted to cope with budget deficits. This comment did not go down well, and at the Royal College of Nursing's 2006 Congress in Bournemouth, Hewitt was heckled and booed by health workers. Delegates at the conference called for a halt to job cuts and bed closures, part of planned NHS reforms aimed at improving the effectiveness of the service, predicting that the number of posts lost could reach 13,000, and said that a work to rule was possible. The BMA chairman, James Johnson, claimed that 2006 was actually one of the worst years on record, and that "2006 has been full of bleak moments for the NHS – job losses, training budgets slashed, trusts delaying operations in order to save money, and hospital closures announced at the same time as new PFI developments. Added to this the government's fixation with introducing the private sector into primary care which risks destabilising the well-respected UK system of general practice."

In January 2007, Hewitt criticised the pay of general practitioners (GPs), which had increased to an average of £106,000 per annum, as a result of the contract the Government had implemented in 2004. Her department claimed that GPs had unfairly taken money out of their practices, when the new contract was actually intended to increase investment in practices, although statements from Lord Warner in 2004 appeared to contradict this claim. He said that "The better services GPs provide, the more pay they will receive, as rewards will be directly linked with patients' experiences."

On 17 March 2007 over 12,000 doctors went to London to take part in a march, objecting to the 'Medical Training Application Service' (MTAS), a job application system for junior doctors, which was subsequently investigated by the Department of Health, and the programme 'Modernising Medical Careers', for revealing the personal data of applicants. The Conservative Leader of the Opposition, David Cameron, joined the march and gave a speech.

On 23 May 2007, Hewitt survived a vote of no confidence in the House of Commons led by the Conservatives, winning by 63 votes. A number of her cabinet colleagues joined her on the front bench to express solidarity. Despite this, pressure continued to mount on her to resign as Health Secretary. As Blair had already announced his imminent resignation for 27 June, it was widely expected Hewitt would step down.

On 3 April 2007, Hewitt apologised on BBC Radio 4's Today programme, saying that the application scheme had caused terrible anxiety for junior doctors. However, the change offered by the Government to the scheme was not accepted by the BMA, and she was accused by Andrew Lansley, the Conservative Shadow Minister for Health, of failing to express genuine regret. Hewitt also made another apology on 1 May 2007 in the House of Commons, after the suspension of the MTAS website, owing to security breaches, which she called "utterly deplorable".

Front-line health workers also lobbied against Hewitt, sending her petitions opposing cuts to the NHS and privatisation plans, which the Department of Health wanted to follow up. Andy Belfield of East Midlands Unison stated that waiting list reductions achieved before the 2005 election were now at risk, owing to expansion of private sector involvement. A survey from October 2006 showed that only 37% of workers from the Department of Health were confident in the leadership provided by Hewitt, compared with 57% across Whitehall.

Despite the criticism, Hewitt managed to balance the books of the NHS, which had previously been in huge debt. After having vowed to resign should the NHS complete another year with debts, Hewitt ensured that the Health Service ended 2006/2007 with a £510 million surplus. However, to do this she was forced to cut 17,000 jobs, cut public health spending, although that had previously been at a high level, and reduce study budgets for NHS staff. By June 2007, although the overall budget was balanced, one in five NHS hospital trusts were still in debt.

As Health Secretary, Hewitt lobbied hard for a complete ban on smoking in public places, which came into force on 1 July 2007. Her predecessor, John Reid, had been in favour of limiting the Government's proposed smoking ban as much as possible, and Labour's 2005 election manifesto had included only a limited pledge, proposing only to ban smoking in places where food was served. Even though he had been moved to Secretary of State for Defence, Reid was the main opponent of her proposals, and a leading figure in the decision of the Cabinet to grant an exemption for private clubs and pubs that did not serve food. However, the exemption in the Cabinet proposals did not find favour with MPs, and the Government gave them a free vote on the issue. Hewitt voted with the rebels to defeat the Cabinet's partial ban, which was replaced by the outright ban that she had always wanted. Sir Liam Donaldson described the ban as "a momentous move, which would prevent the deaths of both smokers and non-smokers." In June 2010, it was announced that there had been a 2.4% fall in heart attack admissions in the year following the ban. She also called for a tax increase on alcopops, although none ultimately took place. She also introduced the NHS Choices website.

Hewitt was known as a reliable Blairite within the cabinet and voted loyally with the Government in Parliament. However, she once notably broke ranks on the BBC's Question Time, expressing her concern about Government plans to introduce ID cards. She ruled herself out of the Deputy Leadership of the Labour Party, declaring her support for Harriet Harman, who was the successful candidate. On 27 June 2007 it was announced that Hewitt would not be Health Secretary in Gordon Brown's new cabinet, an announcement that had been widely expected.

== Retirement from the cabinet ==
On 27 June 2007, with the appointment of Gordon Brown as Prime Minister, Hewitt announced her retirement from frontline politics, citing 'personal reasons'. On resigning from the cabinet, Hewitt was asked by the Prime Minister to head an EU manifesto group, developing European policy for the next general election manifesto.

== After cabinet – consultancies and directorships ==
In January 2008, Hewitt was appointed special consultant to the world's largest chemists, Alliance Boots. Such an appointment was controversial, given Hewitt's former role as Health Minister, resulting in objections to her appointment by members of a Parliamentary committee. Hewitt also become the special adviser to private equity company Cinven, which paid £1.4 billion for Bupa's UK hospitals.

Hewitt joined the BT Group board as a non-executive director on 24 March 2008. and retired from the position in 2015, after six years as a director and five as senior independent director and chair of the remuneration committee.

In July 2009, Hewitt joined the UK India Business Council as its chair and was reappointed to the role in 2014. She stepped down from this role in 2017.

In July 2017, Hewitt was appointed the chair of the NHS Sustainability and Transformation Plan (STP) Oversight Board for Norfolk and Waveney. In this capacity she also attends the Health and Wellbeing Board, Norfolk.

== Stepping down and suspension from Parliamentary Labour Party ==
In May 2009, The Daily Telegraph reported that Hewitt had claimed £920 in legal fees when she had moved out of a flat in her constituency, stayed in hotels, and then rented another flat in Leicester. Claims for furniture included £194 for blinds delivered to her London home. In June 2009 Hewitt announced that she would be stepping down from the House of Commons. She said she was leaving the Commons for personal reasons as she wanted to spend more time with her family.

On 6 January 2010, she and fellow ex-minister Geoff Hoon jointly called for a secret ballot on the future of the leadership of Gordon Brown. The following day Hoon said that it appeared to have failed and was "over". Brown later referred to the call for a secret ballot as a "form of silliness".

In March 2010, Hewitt was suspended from the Parliamentary Labour Party over the question of political lobbying irregularities, alleged in the Channel 4 Dispatches programme.

At the 2010 general election Hewitt was succeeded as MP for Leicester West by Liz Kendall, who had been her Special Adviser (SpAd) during her time in Cabinet.

== Dispatches Lobbyist investigation ==
Hewitt was one of the MPs named in the 2010 sting operation into political lobbying in the Channel 4 Dispatches programme, in which she appeared to claim that she had been paid £3,000 a day to help a client obtain a key seat on a Government advisory group. On 22 March 2010, Hewitt, along with Geoff Hoon and Stephen Byers, was suspended from the Parliamentary Labour Party over the allegations. Hoon and Byers were both banned from the House of Commons for five and two years respectively, but no further action was taken against Hewitt for her part in the "Cash for Access" affair.

== Later career ==
Since September 2020, Hewitt has been an adviser to the British Board of Trade.

In November 2022, the British Chancellor of the Exchequer, Jeremy Hunt, announced that Hewitt would serve in an advisory role to the Conservative Government on NHS administration.

== PIE and the NCCL controversy ==
In February 2014, the NCCL's connection with the Paedophile Information Exchange, an affiliated group, gained media attention, to which Harriet Harman and her partner Jack Dromey also responded. A document in Hewitt's name stated: "NCCL proposes that the age of consent should be lowered to 14, with special provision for situations where the partners are close in age or where the consent of a child over ten can be proved". The document also called for incest to be decriminalised. On 27 February 2014, Hewitt apologised and took responsibility for the "mistakes" made, saying that she and the NCCL had been "naive" about PIE, and that she had never "supported or condoned the vile crimes of child abusers".

== Awards ==
In the 2025 New Year Honours, Hewitt was appointed a Dame Commander of the Order of the British Empire (DBE) by King Charles III "for services to healthcare transformation". She is also a Fellow of the Royal Society of Arts (FRSA).

== Publications ==
- Your Rights by Patricia Hewitt, 1973, Age Concern Books, Age Concern England, ISBN 0-904502-08-2
- Danger Women at Work: Conference Report Edited by Patricia Hewitt, National Council for Civil Liberties, ISBN 0-901108-30-8
- Equality for Women: Comments on Labour's Proposals for an Anti-Discrimination Law, Edited by Patricia Hewitt, National Council for Civil Liberties, ISBN 0-901108-33-2
- Step-by-Step Guide to Rights for Women by Patricia Hewitt, 1975, National Council for Civil Liberties, ISBN 0-901108-49-9
- Your Rights by Patricia Hewitt, 1976, Age Concern Books, Age Concern England, ISBN 0-904502-62-7
- Your Rights: For Pensioners by Patricia Hewitt, 1976, Age Concern Books, Age Concern England, ISBN 0-904502-66-X
- Civil Liberties by Patricia Hewitt, 1977
- The Privacy Report by Patricia Hewitt, 1977
- Privacy: The Information Gatherers by Patricia Hewitt, 1978, National Council for Civil Liberties, ISBN 0-901108-68-5
- Your Rights at Work by Patricia Hewitt, 1978, National Council for Civil Liberties, ISBN 0-901108-71-5
- Computers, Records and the Right to Privacy by Patricia Hewitt, 1979, Input Two-Nine, ISBN 0-905897-27-7
- Income Tax and Sex Discrimination: Practical Guide by Patricia Hewitt, 1979, Civil Liberties Trust, ISBN 0-901108-84-7
- Your Rights at Work by Patricia Hewitt, 1980, National Council for Civil Liberties, ISBN 0-901108-88-X
- Prevention of Terrorism Act: The Case for Repeal by Catherine Scorer and Patricia Hewitt, 1981, National Council for Civil Liberties, ISBN 0-901108-94-4
- The Abuse of Power: Civil Liberties in the United Kingdom by Patricia Hewitt, 1981, Blackwell Publishers, ISBN 0-85520-380-3
- A Fair Cop: Reforming the Police Complaints Procedure by Patricia Hewitt, 1982, Civil Liberties Trust, ISBN 0-946088-01-2
- Race Relations: A Practical Guide to the Law on Race Discrimination by Paul Gordon, John Wright, Patricia Hewitt, 1982, Civil Liberties Trust, ISBN 0-946088-02-0
- Your Rights: For Pensioners by Patricia Hewitt, 1982, Age Concern England, ISBN 0-86242-014-8
- Your Rights at Work by Patricia Hewitt, 1983, National Council for Civil Liberties, ISBN 0-946088-06-3
- Your Rights: For Pensioners by Patricia Hewitt, 1984, Age Concern England, ISBN 0-86242-029-6
- The New Prevention of Terrorism Act: The Case for Repeal by Catherine Scorer, Sarah Spencer, Patricia Hewitt, 1985, Civil Liberties Trust, ISBN 0-946088-13-6
- Your Rights: For Pensioners by Patricia Hewitt, 1986, Age Concern England, ISBN 0-86242-047-4
- A Cleaner, Faster London: Road Pricing, Transport Policy and the Environment by Patricia Hewitt, 1989, Institute for Public Policy Research, ISBN 1-872452-00-0
- Women's Votes: The Key to Winning Edited by Patricia Hewitt and Deborah Mattinson, 1989, Fabian Society, ISBN 0-7163-1353-7
- Your Rights: A Guide to Money Benefits for Retired People by Patricia Hewitt, 1989, Age Concern England, ISBN 0-86242-080-6
- The Family Way: A New Approach to Policy-Making by Anna Coote, Harriet Harman, Patricia Hewitt, 1990, Institute for Public Policy Research, ISBN 1-872452-15-9
- Your Second Baby by Patricia Hewitt and Wendy Rose-Neil, 1990, HarperCollins, ISBN 0-04-440608-8
- Next Left: An Agenda for the 1990s by Tessa Blackstone, James Cornford, David Miliband and Patricia Hewitt, 1992, Institute for Public Policy Research, ISBN 1-872452-45-0
- About Time: Revolution in Work and Family Life by Patricia Hewitt, 1993, Rivers Oram Press, ISBN 1-85489-040-9
- Social Justice, Children and Families by Patricia Hewitt and Penelope Leach, 1993, Institute for Public Policy Research, ISBN 1-872452-76-0
- A British Bill of Rights by Anthony Lester, Patricia Hewitt et al., 1996, Institute for Public Policy Research, ISBN 1-86030-044-8
- The Politics of Attachment: Towards a Secure Society by Sebastian Kraemer, preface by Patricia Hewitt, 1996, Free Association Books Ltd, ISBN 1-85343-344-6
- Defence for the 21st Century: Towards a Post Cold-War Force Structure by Malcolm Chalmer, foreword by Patricia Hewitt, 1997, Fabian Society, ISBN 0-7163-3040-7
- Information Age Government: Delivering the Blair Revolution by Liam Byrne, foreword by Patricia Hewitt, 1997, Fabian Society, ISBN 0-7163-0582-8
- Pebbles in the Sand by Patricia Hewitt, 1998, Dorrance Publishing Co., ISBN 0-8059-4272-6
- Winning for Women by Harriet Harman and Deborah Mattinson, foreword by Patricia Hewitt, 2000, Fabian Society, ISBN 0-7163-0596-8
- Unfinished Business: The New Agenda for the Workplace by Patricia Hewitt, 2004, Institute for Public Policy Research, ISBN 1-86030-259-9
- The Future of the NHS(contributed a chapter) edited by Dr Michelle Tempest, xpl Publishing, ISBN 1-85811-369-5

Parliament of the United Kingdom
Preceded by Greville Janner	Member of Parliament for Leicester West; 1997–2010	Succeeded by Liz Kendall
Political offices
Preceded by Helen Liddell	Economic Secretary to the Treasury; 1998–1999	Succeeded by Melanie Johnson
Preceded by Stephen Byers	Secretary of State for Trade and Industry; 2001–2005	Succeeded by Alan Johnson
Preceded by Baroness Jay of Paddington	Minister for Women; 2001–2005	Succeeded by Tessa Jowell
Preceded by John Reid	Secretary of State for Health; 2005–2007	Succeeded by Alan Johnson
