= INMED =

Irish Network of Medical Educators
- Formation: 2008
- Type: Professional association
- Headquarters: Dublin, Ireland
- Region served: Ireland
- Members: Health professionals and students
- Official language: English
- Chair: Peter Cantillon
- Website: www.inmed.ie

The Irish Network of Medical Educators (INMED) is an interprofessional association for healthcare education professionals in Ireland. INMED was founded in 2008 by National University of Ireland, Galway, Queen's University Belfast, Royal College of Physicians of Ireland, Royal College of Surgeons in Ireland, University College Cork, University College Dublin, and Trinity College Dublin.

== Activities ==
=== Conferences ===
INMED's largest events is its Annual Scientific Meeting (ASM), an international conference which includes keynote lectures, workshops, demonstrations, and student-led sessions. The inaugural ASM took place in 2008 and was opened by Minister for Disability and Mental Health Services Jimmy Devins.

Year	Host institution	Theme
2015	University of Limerick	?
2014	Queen's University Belfast	Creating Supportive Learning Environments
2013	University College Dublin	Patient-Centred Medical Education: Human Factors, Patient Safety, Learning from Patients
2012	Trinity College Dublin	Flexner 100 Years On - A Return to Core Principles
2011	?	?
2010	National University of Ireland, Galway	Learning Transfer in Clinical Education - From Simulation to Reality
2009	University College Cork	Medical Education in Ireland: Changing Times
2008	Royal College of Surgeons in Ireland	?

=== Symposia ===
Year	Host organisation	Title
2013	Irish Forum for Global Health	International Medical Electives
2013	Royal College of Surgeons in Ireland	Are Irish Undergraduate and Intern Training Programmes Fit for Purpose?
2012	National University of Ireland, Galway	Simulation in Irish medical Education: Where are we and Where Should we be Going?
Example	Example	Example

=== Travel grants ===
In 2014, INMED established travel and medical education research grants.

In 2020, INMED South Africa has reported that it has launched its "Seeds for Life" project to help 2,500 households struggling to grow homegrown gardens.

== See also ==
- Medical education
