= Senior house officer =

Medical role

A senior house officer (SHO) is a non-consultant hospital doctor in Ireland and many Commonwealth countries. SHOs usually have a minimum of 1 year post medical school training. SHOs are supervised in their work by consultants and registrars. In training posts these registrars and consultants oversee training and are usually their designated clinical supervisors.

The same structure to junior doctor grades also applied previously in the National Health Service in the UK, and informal use of the term persists there.

== Irish usage ==
NCHD grades in order, from most junior to most senior:

- Intern — (post-graduate year 1)
- Senior house officer — (PGY ≥ 2)
- Registrar — (PGY ≥ 3)
- Specialist registrar — (PGY ≥ 4)
- Fellow (PGY variable)

In Ireland, physicians typically spend one year as an intern, before becoming a Senior House Officer (SHO). Most doctors spend between 2–4 years working as an SHO. Advancing to registrar level is dependent on experience and aptitude within a specialty; in most cases, becoming a registrar depends primarily on having successfully passed postgraduate examinations such as MRCP/MRCS, although this is not a strict requirement. Most doctors work at registrar level for 1–3 years before being accepted onto a training programme in a particular subspecialty (e.g. Cardiology), after which time, they are known as SpRs (Specialist Registrars). SpR programmes typically last for between 3–6 years. On completion of an SpR programme, doctors are eligible to apply for consultant positions, although the majority opt to undertake 1–2 years of fellowship training – often abroad – prior to appointment at consultant level.

== Former UK usage ==
Since the introduction of Modernising Medical Careers (MMC), grades in the UK differ from those in Ireland.

=== British postgraduate training ===
Before MMC, physicians applied for SHO posts after completing their mandatory pre-registration house officer (PRHO) year after qualifying from medical school. They would typically work as an SHO for 2–3 years, or occasionally longer, before going on to a certain subspeciality where they would take up a specialist registrar post to train as a specialist in that particular field. To qualify for these, SHOs had to be in posts approved by a regional postgraduate dean, as well as passing postgraduate exams (such as the Membership of the Royal College of Physicians, MRCP). SHO jobs typically lasted four or six months in various departments and were often provided in one- or two-year rotations.

=== Modernising medical careers ===
Medical career grades of the National Health Service
Year	Current (Modernising Medical Careers)		Previous	
1	Foundation doctor (FY1 and FY2), 2 years		Pre-registration house officer (PRHO), 1 year	
2	Foundation doctor (FY1 and FY2), 2 years		Senior house officer (SHO), minimum 2 years; often more	
3	Specialty registrar, general practice (GPST), minimum 3 years	Specialty registrar, hospital speciality (SpR), minimum 5 years	Senior house officer (SHO), minimum 2 years; often more	
4	Specialty registrar, general practice (GPST), minimum 3 years	Specialty registrar, hospital speciality (SpR), minimum 5 years	Specialist registrar, 4–6 years	GP registrar, 1 year
5	Specialty registrar, general practice (GPST), minimum 3 years	Specialty registrar, hospital speciality (SpR), minimum 5 years	Specialist registrar, 4–6 years	General practitioner, 4 years total time in training
6–8	General practitioner, minimum 5 years total time in training	Specialty registrar, hospital speciality (SpR), minimum 5 years	Specialist registrar, 4–6 years	General practitioner, 4 years total time in training
9	General practitioner, minimum 5 years total time in training	Consultant, minimum 7 years total time in training	Consultant, minimum 7–9 years total time in training	General practitioner, 4 years total time in training
Optional	Training is competency based, times shown are a minimum. Training may be extended by obtaining an Academic Clinical Fellowship for research or by dual certification in another speciality.		Training may be extended by pursuing medical research (usually 2–3 years), usually with clinical duties as well	

In 2002, the Department of Health announced reforms in the training of newly qualified doctors under the banner of "Modernising Medical Careers", merging the PRHO year and the first year of SHO training into a "foundation programme" (FY1 and FY2). This programme was formally introduced in August 2005.

In August 2002, Professor Sir Liam Donaldson, the then Chief Medical Officer, published a report titled "Unfinished Business", which focused on reforming SHO training. The SHO grade was abolished and renamed specialty registrar. This change took place in 2007. Amongst the many changes, many doctors who had completed their Foundation Training were now appointed into a "run-through" training programme that incorporated the previous SHO and specialist registrar grades. The job title changed from "SHO" to "ST1/ST2" (specialist trainee year 1 & year 2). Part of this decision was subsequently reversed in a number of specialties, with competitive entry into the registrar grade ("uncoupled training"), and in these specialties the SHO level posts are referred to as "CT1/CT2" (core trainee year 1 & year 2) and in some "CT3".

=== Current status in the UK ===
Some hospitals use the term senior house officer in an unofficial capacity for physicians in FY2 and CT1/2 year, who often have similar working patterns in duty shift rotas.

The term still applies to non training posts, those organised by a hospital/trust as opposed to a Deanery, where a physician is employed at a level after full registration with the GMC and before entering higher specialty training. These posts are typically referred to as "Trust SHO", "Junior Clinical Fellow" or other such terms.

== United States ==
In the United States, physicians in training are also sometimes referred to as "senior house officers" in their later years of residency, but the term is more variable in its American than its European usage.

== Use in the rest of the world ==
Specializing post-graduate clinical students are still referred to as Senior House Officers in many other countries around the world, most of which were British colonies and adopted the British education system like Uganda.

== See also ==
- Junior doctor
- Non-consultant hospital doctor
- Internship (medicine)
- Consultant (medicine)
