= Foundation Programme (United Kingdom medical education) =

Programme of workplace-based learning for junior doctors

In the United Kingdom, the Foundation Programme is a two-year structured programme of workplace-based learning for junior medical doctors that forms a bridge between medical school and specialty training. The programme aims to provide a safe, well-supervised environment for medical doctors to put into practice what they learned in medical school. It provides them with the generalist medical knowledge and skills to meet the requirements of the General Medical Council (GMC) The New Doctor (2007) and the Foundation Programme Curriculum (2007) and prepares them for entry into specialty training. All medical graduates must undertake, and complete the Foundation Programme in order to progress onto specialist or a general practitioner training in the UK.

The programme was first proposed by England’s Chief Medical Officer, Professor Sir Liam Donaldson in 2002 in his document Unfinished Business and replaces the old Pre-Registration House Officer year and the first year of the Senior House Officer grade. Introduced as part of a series of initiatives under the Modernising Medical Careers (MMC) umbrella, the programme aims to ensure that foundation doctors develop and enhance their clinical and generic skills at the same time as exploring a range of career options.

The Specialised Foundation Programme (SFP) is the academic track within the UK’s two-year mandatory postgraduate medical training pathway. Alongside standard clinical rotations, it includes protected time- typically a four-month block in the second year for research, teaching or leadership. Awarded through a separate, competitive national application process, the SFP is designed for doctors interested in combining clinical practice with broader contributions to healthcare. These posts give trainees the opportunity to develop research, teaching and leadership skills in addition to the core clinical competencies outlined in the Foundation curriculum. They are intended to be beneficial to both trainees who plan to go into academic medicine (the majority of SFP trainees) as well as those who choose a different medical career.

== See also ==
- Foundation doctor
- Internship (medicine)
