= Modernising Medical Careers =

UK postgraduate medical treatment programme

Modernising Medical Careers (MMC) is a programme for postgraduate medical training introduced in the United Kingdom in 2005. The programme replaced the traditional grades of medical career before the level of Consultant. The different stages of the programme contribute towards a "Certificate of Completion of Training" (CCT). It has been dogged by criticism within and outside the medical profession, and an independent review of MMC led by Professor Sir John Tooke criticised many aspects of it.

MMC refers to both the programme itself, and also to the temporary organization, formed in 2003, responsible for its nationwide implementation.

== Structure ==
=== Foundation Programme ===
From 2005 new medical graduates embarked on a two-year Foundation Programme in place of the former one-year Pre-registration house officer (PRHO) term and the first year of the former Senior house officer (SHO) term, with the older titles nominally replaced by "Foundation House Officer 1" or F1 and "Foundation House Officer 2" or F2. In keeping with the previous system, new graduates are only provisionally registered with the General Medical Council (GMC) during the first year, with full registration taking place following successful completion of the first year of postgraduate training. At this point doctors move straight into the F2 year in most, but not all, foundation schools, without having to apply again. Under the previous system, doctors applied for SHO jobs within six to eight months of beginning work as a PRHO.

The Foundation Programme consists of two years training split into rotations of three or four months in different specialties. The programme features continuing assessments, and the introduction of a national curriculum intended to nationalise and standardise medical training. As part of this junior doctors are required to maintain a "learning portfolio". Despite these notional benefits, 69% of doctors surveyed felt F2 was not an improvement on the first-year SHO experience it replaced, with experiences of the programme "very variable".

=== Specialty Training ===
The next stage of training is the Specialty Registrar (StR). This is a unification of the previous training grades of SHO (except for year 1) and the old SpR grade. The duration of StR training varies by specialty, but as with the Foundation years, all programmes have a standardised curriculum and assessment model that is approved by the Postgraduate Medical Education and Training Board. In 2007 appointments were made centrally, but following the disastrous outcomes of that system, whereby some 14,000 junior doctors were left without jobs, many specialties have appointed registrars locally since 2008.

This meant that doctors are required under the new system to choose a specialty midway through F2, after just one-and-a-half years of practice. Under the old system, doctors had the flexibility to try a variety of different jobs before deciding what to specialise in, and this allowed them to build a broader base for their ultimate specialism. This change ran entirely against existing and subsequent evidence that junior doctors do not know immediately what specialism they wish to pursue, with fewer than a third thinking they knew after F1 and with many forced to decide on a specialism without having had any opportunity to practice it. In keeping with these data, 66% of doctors surveyed felt Foundation Training had not had a positive effect on clinical service delivery.

On completion of these training programmes, trainees will be awarded a Certificate of Completion of Training (CCT) and will be entitled to enter the Specialist Register or the General Practitioner (GP) Register as appropriate.

=== Medical Assessment ===
Another principle of MMC has been that doctors from Foundation level and upwards undergo regular assessment of their skills and activities while in practice. This would commence for Foundation level in August 2005, with the new intake of Foundation trainees. After spending extensively on a management consultant to advise on how to go about this, MMC failed to resolve how this would be implemented and handed the decision at the last moment in July 2005 to the deaneries. In the few weeks they were given to organize the assessment for their own trainees, thirteen deaneries and the small cohort of naval medical trainees opted to use Healthcare Assessment and Training (HcAT), based at Sheffield Children's Hospital. A smaller number of deaneries opted to use the NHS eportfolio, based in NHS Scotland.

== Rationale ==
MMC was intended to "improve patient care by improving medical education with a transparent and efficient career path for doctors". This followed the publication of the NHS Plan 2000, which committed to increase the number of consultants in the NHS and to "modernise the Senior House Officer (SHO) grade".

While these principles received broad support, their implementation has not, largely because the Department of Health has achieved an increase in the number of consultants by reducing the length of training required to reach the grade from an average of 21,000 to just 6,000 hours. This has led to accusations in the press, from regional medical selection committees, and from Remedy UK that it has been a "dumbing-down" process.

In keeping with this accusation, just 1% of doctors surveyed in the Tooke Report felt that run-through training would have a positive effect on clinical service delivery, and 58% believed patients would not benefit from MMC.

== Implementation ==
=== MTAS ===
In 2007 appointment to this level of training was facilitated using the Medical Training Application Service. Due to several system failures and political pressure, this was abandoned partway during the process. In 2008, following significant pressure from junior doctors, the MMC Programme Board for England came to an agreement to revert to a local application process determined by deaneries and specialties. Agreement was made that no further attempts would be made to introduce new selection methodologies without piloting, academic evaluation and professional buy-in.

NHS Medical Career Grades
	Old System		New System (Modernising Medical Careers)	
Year 1:	Pre-registration House Officer (PRHO) 1 year		Foundation Programme: 2 years	
Year 2:	Senior House Officer (SHO) a minimum of 2 years, although often more.		Foundation Programme: 2 years	
Year 3:	Senior House Officer (SHO) a minimum of 2 years, although often more.		Specialty Registrar (StR) in a hospital specialty: 5–8 years	Specialty Registrar (StR) in general practice: 3 years
Year 4:	Specialist Registrar: 4–6 years	GP Registrar: 1 year	Specialty Registrar (StR) in a hospital specialty: 5–8 years	Specialty Registrar (StR) in general practice: 3 years
Year 5:	Specialist Registrar: 4–6 years	General Practitioner total time in training: 4 years	Specialty Registrar (StR) in a hospital specialty: 5–8 years	Specialty Registrar (StR) in general practice: 3 years
Years 6-8:	Specialist Registrar: 4–6 years	General Practitioner total time in training: 4 years	Specialty Registrar (StR) in a hospital specialty: 5–8 years	General Practitioner total time in training: 5 years
Year 9:	Consultant total time in training: minimum 7—9 years	General Practitioner total time in training: 4 years	Consultant total time in training: 7—10 years*	General Practitioner total time in training: 5 years
Optional	Training may be extended by pursuing medical research (usually two-three years), usually with clinical duties as well		Training may be extended by obtaining an Academic Clinical Fellowship for research, or a Clinical Fellowship for sub-specialisation. *due to competition for consultant posts, it may take longer than 8 years to gain Consultant status .	

Concerns have been expressed by Remedy UK, in the Lancet, and by the British Medical Association, among others that the reforms have not been fully thought through, may worsen the training situation for many junior doctors, and may be part of a covert plan to create "a permanent subclass" of cheap, undertrained subspecialists.

=== Criticisms ===
A number of criticisms have been made about the new MMC system, and it was perceived sufficiently poorly within the medical profession that its implementation was ultimately boycotted by senior doctors around the country.

The transition to the new system and the Medical Training Application Service (MTAS) have been particularly criticised. In order to implement MMC, all trainees not appointed to specialist registrar posts for 1 August 2007 were required to apply for posts on the new MMC curriculum, with far fewer posts than applicants. However, the application process has had technical problems, and was criticised over the weighting and marking of the applications, with one London training school calling it "unfair and ineffective" in resigning from the process.

There were also concerns expressed over the number of training posts available and the subsequent risk that trained doctors would be forced to emigrate or leave the profession as they would be unable to find jobs in the UK. Government claims that there were 23,000 posts for 32,000 applicants were revealed by subsequent work to be 4,500 out, with the actual number appearing to be 18,500.

On 17 March 2007 doctors marched in mass protest orchestrated by Remedy UK against the system in London and Glasgow.

MMC & MTAS march in London

=== Resignations ===
On 30 March 2007, Professor Alan Crockard resigned as national director of Modernising Medical Careers. In his letter of resignation to Prof Sir Liam Donaldson the chief medical officer for England, Professor Crockard stated that he was increasingly aware that he had "responsibility, but less and less authority" and that "the overriding message coming back from the profession is that it has lost confidence in the current recruitment system". Professor Crockard asked that this be urgently addressed "in the interest of the most important people in the whole process, the junior doctors".

On 31 March 2007, Alex Liakos, one of the student advisers to MMC, also resigned, citing widespread misgivings about MMC as a whole and "tokenistic" involvement of doctors in the process.

On 5 April 2007 Professor Shelley Heard resigned as MMC National Clinical Advisor, expressing her support for MMC in principle but citing the major problems with the recruitment process and concerns over the conclusions of the Department of Health's Review Group.

The MTAS affair was swiftly followed by a purge of the remaining members of MMC, and by mid or late 2007 all of the senior members of MMC had been replaced, effectively forming a new organization.

=== Department of Health response ===
The Department of Health launched a full review of the recruitment process for specialty training on 9 March 2007. On 22 March 2007 the Review Group issued a statement building on the recommendations they had made and guaranteeing interviews to all long-listable applicants. These recommendations were not found acceptable by the British Medical Association's junior doctors committee and they pulled out from the negotiations with the government on 23 March.

=== Secretary of State's apologies ===
On 3 April 2007, during an interview on BBC Radio 4's Today programme, the Health Secretary Patricia Hewitt apologised to junior doctors over the crisis, saying that the application scheme had caused "needless anxiety and distress". The BMA welcomed the government's acknowledgement of the problem but stated that "an apology isn't enough". Patricia Hewitt's apology was repeated to parliament on 16 April 2007, in which she stated that "the problems that have arisen relate in the main to the implementation process and not to the underlying principles of Modernising Medical Careers.". This was later disputed in the independent inquiry into MMC by Sir John Tooke.

Later that month Shadow Health Secretary Andrew Lansley accused Ms Hewitt of failing to express genuine regret over the situation.

On 1 May 2007 Ms Hewitt made another apology in the House of Commons after the suspension of the MTAS website due to security breaches that she described as "utterly deplorable".

=== MTAS website taken offline ===
The MTAS website was suspended on 26 April 2007 after a Channel 4 News report stated that applicants had been able to see each other's files by changing two digits in the personalised web address given to each individual. At that point the Department of Health announced that this was a temporary suspension.

On 15 May 2007 MTAS was shelved by ministers due to security breaches. Patricia Hewitt said that after the first round of recruitment, the system would only fulfil a monitoring role that year.

=== Judicial review ===
A judicial review of MTAS was requested by pressure group Remedy UK, who demanded that the appointments process should be scrapped altogether. The case was heard in the High Court from 16 to 17 May 2007. On Wednesday 23 May 2007 Mr Justice Goldring ruled against Remedy UK, stating that "although far from ideal", the Review Group's decision on amending the appointments process after the first round of interviews was "within the range of reasonable responses", and that the Review Group was "entitled to reach the decision it did given the circumstances facing it at the time". Although he ruled against invalidating the interviews that had already taken place, Mr Justice Goldring added that this judgement did not imply that junior doctors were not entitled to feel aggrieved, as "the premature introduction of MTAS has had disastrous consequences". Remedy UK have said they will not appeal the verdict, in order to avoid further uncertainty for junior doctors.

=== Aftermath ===
For the 2008 specialty recruitment, deaneries and Royal Colleges were asked to arrange the recruitment for all specialities themselves, with particular deaneries or Colleges handling national recruitment for particular disciplines. Although the intention was to have a new version of MTAS operations for the 2009 recruitment process, again this is being handed over the colleges and deaneries.

== EWTD Impact on training ==
Obliging doctors to adhere to the European Working Time Directive has had an effect on patient care and on medical training with the Royal College of Surgeons of England reviewing research in 2009 and finding that there were not enough surgeons to fill rotas if they worked only 48 hours a week. They further noted that 90% of trainees were exceeding their rostered hours on a weekly basis, 85% reported coming in to do operations on their days off, 75% felt the working patterns held by their human resources departments did not reflect their actual working hours, and 55% reported being pressured to falsely declare their actual hours worked. More than two thirds felt the quality of their training and operative skills had deteriorated as a result of shift-working patterns brought in to meet working time regulations, and 71% felt the reduction in working hours had not led to any improvement in their work/life balance.

The Association of Surgeons in Training have stated that they believe 65 hours a week is required to gain the necessary training opportunities, and that 80% of respondents to a survey they ran would support an opt-out of the European Working Time Regulation (EWTR) to protect training.

== See also ==
- Modernising Scientific Careers
