= Certificate of Completion of Training =

Certificate for UK specialist medical doctors

The Certificate of Completion of Training (CCT) is the certificate that medical doctors in the United Kingdom receive to indicate that they have completed training in their chosen specialty and are therefore eligible for entry onto the specialist or GP register. This registration is needed to apply for posts as a consultant or a general practitioner (GP) respectively.

As of 2025, there are postgraduate medical training programmes in 65 specialties that lead to the award of a CCT.

This certificate is awarded by the General Medical Council (GMC), a self-funding statutory body independent of the government and the Royal Colleges of the various medical specialties.

The GMC took on its role on 1 April 2010 following its merger with the former Postgraduate Medical Education and Training Board. From 1995 to 2005, hospital doctors' training was assessed and deemed to be complete by the Specialist Training Authority (STA), which was formed by the combined Royal Colleges. The STA awarded a certificate called a Certificate of Completion of Specialist Training, or CCST, which is equivalent to the CCT.
