= Registrar (medicine) =

Medical practitioner in a specialty training programme

In medicine, a registrar is a doctor, dentist, or public health practitioner who is working towards certification in a medical specialty, usually as part of a structured training programme. The term is most commonly used in the United Kingdom and Commonwealth countries such as Australia, New Zealand, and South Africa. Registrars have full medical registration and deliver medical care to patients while supervised by a senior doctor such as a Consultant as part of a structured training experience that leads to being able to undertake independent practice in a hospital specialty or working as a general practitioner.

== United Kingdom ==
In the UK medical system, a specialist is someone who has the necessary experience and qualifications to be placed on the GMC's Specialist Register. Training to become a General Practitioner will also involve a Specialty Registrar training scheme and completion will lead to eligibility for entry on the General Practice Register. The training grade of Specialty registrar (StR) was introduced into UK postgraduate medical training in 2007 as part of the Modernising Medical Careers programme with the specialty registrar training places being created instead of the Senior House Officer (SHO) and Specialist registrar (SpR) posts.

Doctors can enter this training grade after completing their foundation training, but need to go through a competitive process of entry into specialty training schemes. Completing the training scheme will lead to the award of a Certificate of Completion of Training (CCT), subject to satisfactory in-training assessment and progress; this is a necessary pre-requisite for entry onto the Specialist Register or GP Register. From 10 May 2013, fees paid by trainees are an allowable tax deduction from employment income, or alternatively are not liable to tax and national insurance as a benefit if paid by the employer.

Specialty Training programmes vary in length and are tailored to the needs of the specialty. The curricula used for the different specialty training schemes are set by the relevant medical royal college. Under the old system, before applying for the old Registrar posts, applicants were required to have sat and passed part, or all, of a medical royal college's membership examinations while still a Senior House Officer. Under the new system Foundation doctors do not need to sit these exams as they play no part in the selection process and are discouraged from doing so. It is, however, still common practice to begin to take these exams during the second year of the foundation programme and is recommended by experts outside MMC. The appropriate royal college exams will now be taken during the first year or two of the Specialty Registrar training scheme.

Medical career grades of the National Health Service
Year	Current (Modernising Medical Careers)		Previous	
1	Foundation doctor (FY1 and FY2), 2 years		Pre-registration house officer (PRHO), 1 year	
2	Foundation doctor (FY1 and FY2), 2 years		Senior house officer (SHO), minimum 2 years; often more	
3	Specialty registrar, general practice (GPST), minimum 3 years	Specialty registrar, hospital speciality (SpR), minimum 5 years	Senior house officer (SHO), minimum 2 years; often more	
4	Specialty registrar, general practice (GPST), minimum 3 years	Specialty registrar, hospital speciality (SpR), minimum 5 years	Specialist registrar, 4–6 years	GP registrar, 1 year
5	Specialty registrar, general practice (GPST), minimum 3 years	Specialty registrar, hospital speciality (SpR), minimum 5 years	Specialist registrar, 4–6 years	General practitioner, 4 years total time in training
6–8	General practitioner, minimum 5 years total time in training	Specialty registrar, hospital speciality (SpR), minimum 5 years	Specialist registrar, 4–6 years	General practitioner, 4 years total time in training
9	General practitioner, minimum 5 years total time in training	Consultant, minimum 7 years total time in training	Consultant, minimum 7–9 years total time in training	General practitioner, 4 years total time in training
Optional	Training is competency based, times shown are a minimum. Training may be extended by obtaining an Academic Clinical Fellowship for research or by dual certification in another speciality.		Training may be extended by pursuing medical research (usually 2–3 years), usually with clinical duties as well	

== See also ==
- Residency (medicine)
- Fellowship (medicine)
- Consultant (medicine)
