= Pre-registration house officer =

Archaic term for an NHS Foundation Year 1 doctor

Pre-registration house officer (PRHO), commonly referred to as house officer and less commonly as houseman, is a former official term for a grade of junior doctor that was, until 2005, the only job open to medical graduates in the United Kingdom who had just passed their final examinations at medical school and had received their medical degrees. The term "house officer" is still used to refer to foundation doctors (in Foundation Years 1 and 2 known as FY1s and FY2s).

Newly qualified doctors are only allowed provisional registration with the General Medical Council, hence their first jobs are prior to full registration with the GMC and these jobs were named pre-registration house officer jobs, usually consisting of two six-month jobs; one predominantly involved with general surgery (often being called a house surgeon), and one predominantly involved with general medicine (often being called a house physician). After 1948, PRHO was the lowest grade in the medical hierarchy of qualified doctors in the National Health Service, and was the doctor most often called by nursing staff to see patients on hospital wards, especially at the most unsocial hours of work shifts. After satisfactory work reports in both house jobs, the PRHO gained full registration with the General Medical Council, which is a legal requirement to be able to work in all other medical jobs in the United Kingdom (which until 1922 included the whole of Ireland). Although the PRHO year was taken after graduating from a medical school, the supervision of the PRHO was the responsibility of the medical school from which the PRHO had graduated, and a representative of that medical school was responsible for signing the registration forms which go to the General Medical Council to certify that the PRHO year had been completed satisfactorily. After completing the PRHO year, the junior doctors usually became Senior house officers to further their career in the medical profession.

Medical career grades of the National Health Service
Year	Current (Modernising Medical Careers)		Previous	
1	Foundation doctor (FY1 and FY2), 2 years		Pre-registration house officer (PRHO), 1 year	
2	Foundation doctor (FY1 and FY2), 2 years		Senior house officer (SHO), minimum 2 years; often more	
3	Specialty registrar, general practice (GPST), minimum 3 years	Specialty registrar, hospital speciality (SpR), minimum 5 years	Senior house officer (SHO), minimum 2 years; often more	
4	Specialty registrar, general practice (GPST), minimum 3 years	Specialty registrar, hospital speciality (SpR), minimum 5 years	Specialist registrar, 4–6 years	GP registrar, 1 year
5	Specialty registrar, general practice (GPST), minimum 3 years	Specialty registrar, hospital speciality (SpR), minimum 5 years	Specialist registrar, 4–6 years	General practitioner, 4 years total time in training
6–8	General practitioner, minimum 5 years total time in training	Specialty registrar, hospital speciality (SpR), minimum 5 years	Specialist registrar, 4–6 years	General practitioner, 4 years total time in training
9	General practitioner, minimum 5 years total time in training	Consultant, minimum 7 years total time in training	Consultant, minimum 7–9 years total time in training	General practitioner, 4 years total time in training
Optional	Training is competency based, times shown are a minimum. Training may be extended by obtaining an Academic Clinical Fellowship for research or by dual certification in another speciality.		Training may be extended by pursuing medical research (usually 2–3 years), usually with clinical duties as well	

Following changes in postgraduate medical education, from 2005, what was the PRHO year now forms the first year of Foundation Training (Foundation Year 1), and trainees during this year now have the job title of Foundation House Officer 1 instead of PRHO. Despite this, they are still often referred to as House Officers by themselves and other hospital staff.

In other parts of the world, this stage is generally referred to as medical internship.

== See also ==
- Foundation doctor
- Senior house officer
