= Consultant (medicine) =

Title of a senior hospital-based physician or surgeon

In the United Kingdom, Ireland, and parts of the Commonwealth, consultant is the title of a senior hospital-based physician or surgeon who has completed all of their specialist training and been placed on the specialist register in their chosen specialty. These consultants have both clinical responsibilities as well as administrative responsibilities in managing Specialty, Associate Specialist, and Specialist (SAS) doctors and resident doctors. Following graduation from medical school, it takes approximately 8-10 years to become a consultant.

The primary objective of a consultant is to use expert knowledge and skill to diagnose and treat patients and ultimate clinical responsibility for their care. A physician must be on the Specialist Register before they may be employed as a substantive consultant in the National Health Service (NHS). This usually entails holding a Certificate of Completion of Training (CCT) in any of the recognised specialities, but academics with substantial publications and international reputation may be exempted from this requirement, in the expectation that they will practice at a tertiary level. "Locum consultant" appointments of limited duration may be given to those with clinical experience, with or without higher qualifications.

The term consultant may also be prefixed to other non-medical high specialist leadership roles in UK Healthcare settings such as Consultant Nurse, Consultant Dietician, Consultant Paramedic, and Consultant Pharmacist. These are roles undertaken by Non-Medical Practitioners in posts agreed by the Department of Health.

== Definition ==
=== CCSC/BMA ===
The Central Consultants and Specialists Committee (CCSC), which is a Standing Committee of the BMA, agreed the following as a very broad description of the role of consultants:

"Primarily as the delivery of expert clinical care usually within a team, including the ability to recognise and manage the more complex end of the specialty spectrum (diagnosis, management decisions, difficult cases, including apparently simple cases which have a high incidence of complications in more inexperienced hands) but also involved in running departments, managerial decisions, teaching, training, researching, developing local services – generally being involved in the wider management and leadership of the organisations they work in, and the NHS generally."

This report from 2008 describes how most consultants work now and it describes what the 2003 contract was intended (by BMA negotiators at least) to remunerate and develop (a consultant-based service).

=== Cohn ===
Cohn mentions that "the consultant should try to support the referring physician and comfort the patient".

== Responsibilities ==
A consultant typically leads a "firm" (team of doctors), which comprises specialty registrars and foundation doctors, all training to work in the consultant's speciality, as well as other "career grade" doctors such as clinical assistants, clinical fellows, speciality doctors, associate specialists and staff grade doctors. They also have numerous other key roles in the functioning of hospitals and the wider health service.

The term "firm" has lost currency (at least in the UK) in the last decade.

== Training ==
The time required to become a consultant depends upon a number of factors, but principally the speciality chosen. Certain specialities require longer training, or are more competitive, and therefore becoming a consultant can take longer. Other specialities are relatively easy to progress through, and it is possible for a doctor to become a consultant much earlier in their career. After Modernising Medical Careers came into operation (in early 2007), the length of training was fixed for the majority of doctors, at about nine years.

== Contracts ==
Most consultants work on a long-term contract with one or more hospital trusts, and these posts are known as substantive consultant positions. Various titles (such as senior consultant, clinical director, medical director, lead consultant etc.) exist for consultants who have particular responsibilities for the overall management of the hospital or some part thereof.

In the UK all doctors including consultants have the right to undertake private medical work. Some make a career out of private medical practice. For others it is used to supplement their work for the NHS.

Other doctors - some without a CCT, a few who have only just obtained that qualification, others who have retired from substantive appointments, and others who wish to use some of their annual leave to generate additional earnings - may be employed as locum consultants, who have the same clinical responsibility, but are typically on fixed, short-term contracts.

Medical career grades of the National Health Service
Year	Current (Modernising Medical Careers)		Previous	
1	Foundation doctor (FY1 and FY2), 2 years		Pre-registration house officer (PRHO), 1 year	
2	Foundation doctor (FY1 and FY2), 2 years		Senior house officer (SHO), minimum 2 years; often more	
3	Specialty registrar, general practice (GPST), minimum 3 years	Specialty registrar, hospital speciality (SpR), minimum 5 years	Senior house officer (SHO), minimum 2 years; often more	
4	Specialty registrar, general practice (GPST), minimum 3 years	Specialty registrar, hospital speciality (SpR), minimum 5 years	Specialist registrar, 4–6 years	GP registrar, 1 year
5	Specialty registrar, general practice (GPST), minimum 3 years	Specialty registrar, hospital speciality (SpR), minimum 5 years	Specialist registrar, 4–6 years	General practitioner, 4 years total time in training
6–8	General practitioner, minimum 5 years total time in training	Specialty registrar, hospital speciality (SpR), minimum 5 years	Specialist registrar, 4–6 years	General practitioner, 4 years total time in training
9	General practitioner, minimum 5 years total time in training	Consultant, minimum 7 years total time in training	Consultant, minimum 7–9 years total time in training	General practitioner, 4 years total time in training
Optional	Training is competency based, times shown are a minimum. Training may be extended by obtaining an Academic Clinical Fellowship for research or by dual certification in another speciality.		Training may be extended by pursuing medical research (usually 2–3 years), usually with clinical duties as well	

== Pay scale (2022 contract) ==
Consultants in the NHS start £88,364 (Threshold 1) to £119,133 (Threshold 8) with additional Clinical Excellence Awards available.

== See also ==
- Attending physician (equivalent position in the United States and Canada)
