= Foundation doctor =

Grade of UK medical practitioner

A foundation doctor, or resident doctor, is a grade of medical practitioner in the United Kingdom undertaking the Foundation Programme, a two-year, general postgraduate medical training programme which forms the bridge between medical school and specialist/general practice training. Doctors in the first year of the programme are known as Foundation Year 1 (FY1) doctors, and those in the second year are known as Foundation Year 2 (FY2) doctors. Being a foundation doctor is compulsory for all newly qualified medical practitioners in the UK starting from 2005 onwards. The grade of foundation doctor has replaced the traditional grades of pre-registration house officer and senior house officer.

Medical career grades of the National Health Service
Year	Current (Modernising Medical Careers)		Previous	
1	Foundation doctor -sometimes called Foundation House Officer, 2 years (FY1 and FY2)		Pre-registration house officer (PRHO), 1 year	
2	Foundation doctor -sometimes called Foundation House Officer, 2 years (FY1 and FY2)		Senior house officer (SHO), minimum 2 years; often more	
3	Core Trainee/Specialist Trainee, often still referred to as Senior house officer, CT/ST 1-2	Specialty registrar, general practice (GPST 1-3)	Senior house officer (SHO), minimum 2 years; often more	
4	Core Trainee/Specialist Trainee, often still referred to as Senior house officer, CT/ST 1-2	Specialty registrar, general practice (GPST 1-3)	Specialist registrar, 4–6 years	GP registrar, 1 year
5	Specialty registrar, hospital speciality (SpR, CT 3/ ST 3-6+)	Specialty registrar, general practice (GPST 1-3)	Specialist registrar, 4–6 years	General practitioner, 4 years total time in training
6	Specialty registrar, hospital speciality (SpR, CT 3/ ST 3-6+)	General practitioner, minimum 5 years total time in training	Specialist registrar, 4–6 years	General practitioner, 4 years total time in training
7	Specialty registrar, hospital speciality (SpR, CT 3/ ST 3-6+)	General practitioner, minimum 5 years total time in training	Consultant, minimum 7 years total time in training	General practitioner, 4 years total time in training
8	Consultant, minimum 7–9 years total time in training	General practitioner, minimum 5 years total time in training	Consultant, minimum 7 years total time in training	General practitioner, 4 years total time in training
Optional	Training is competency based, times shown are a minimum. Training may be extended by obtaining an Academic Clinical Fellowship for research or by dual certification in another speciality.		Training may be extended by pursuing medical research (usually 2–3 years), usually with clinical duties as well	

Foundation doctors have the opportunity to gain experience in a series of posts in a variety of specialties and healthcare settings. Learning objectives for each stage are specific and focused on demonstration of clinical competences. Emphasis was on the assessment and management of acutely ill patients, but changes in the curriculum have stressed that chronic conditions are also important. Training also encompasses the generic professional skills applicable to all areas of medicine – teamwork, time management, communication and IT skills.

== Foundation Year 1 ==
This year replaces what was known as pre-registration house officer. In the first year of foundation training, FY1s rotate through three or four jobs in different hospital specialties. The General Medical Council specify that every FY1 must complete at least three months of general medicine. Until 2007, it was also required for all FY1s to complete at least three months of general surgery, and therefore most programmes still include this. The rest of the year may be made up of further time spent in general medicine or general surgery, or time spent in other specialties (but not in general practice).

== Foundation Year 2 ==
The first year of the posts in FY2 is in different specialties, such as general practice, emergency medicine, paediatrics, psychiatry, obstetrics or pathology. The training builds on what has been achieved during the previous year in FY1. FY2s will sometimes also refer to themselves as SHOs (for senior house officers) and will be in the SHO rota. Although some departments have separate rotas for GPVTS trainees and FY2s and a separate rota for specialist trainees.

== See also ==
- Foundation Programme
- Internship (medicine)
