= North Midlands =

Coordinates: 53°N 1.5°W

- proposed Combined authority area
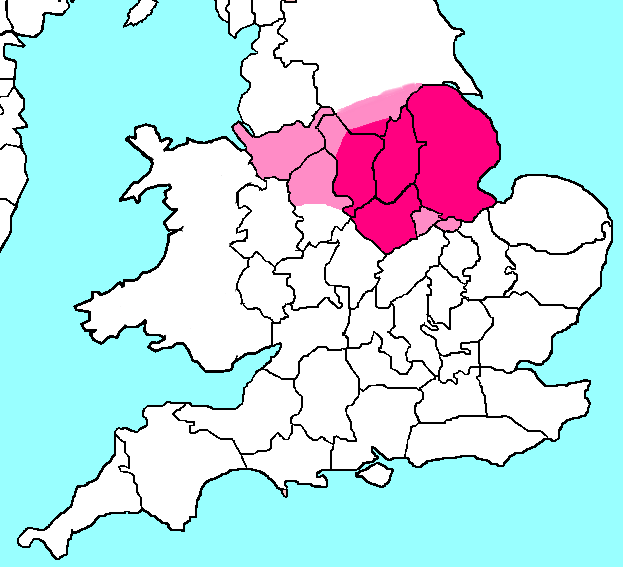
- Areas typically included in the North Midlands are highlighted in pink. Counties sometimes included in the North Midlands are highlighted in light pink.
- Country: United Kingdom
- Constituent country: England
- Regions: East of England; East Midlands; Yorkshire and the Humber; West Midlands
- Historic Counties: Nottinghamshire; Leicestershire; Lincolnshire; Derbyshire; some definitions also include parts or all of: Cheshire; Staffordshire; Rutland; Yorkshire
- Established: N/A
- HQ: Nottingham
- Districts: List: Amber Valley; Ashfield; Bassetlaw; Bolsover; Broxtowe; Chesterfield; Derby; Derbyshire; Derbyshire Dales; Erewash; Gedling; High Peak; Mansfield; Newark and Sherwood; North East Derbyshire; Nottingham; Nottinghamshire; Rushcliffe; South Derbyshire

Government
  - Type: Local enterprise partnership
  - Body: D2N2 Local Enterprise Partnership
  - Leadership: Chairman and board
  - Chairman: Peter Richardson

Area
  - Total: 1,847 sq mi (4,785 km^{2})

Population (2025)
  - Total: 1,861,200
- Time zone: UTC0 (Greenwich Mean Time)
  - Summer (DST): UTC+1 (British Summer Time)
- Website: northmidlands.uk

The North Midlands is a loosely defined area covering the northern parts of the Midlands in England. It is not an International Territorial Level region like the East Midlands or the West Midlands.

A statistical definition in 1881 included the counties of Derbyshire, Leicestershire, Lincolnshire, Nottinghamshire and Rutland, an area historically known as the Five Boroughs of the Danelaw. A Second World War civil defence region called North Midland included the five counties and Northamptonshire. It has remained in informal use for Derbyshire and Nottinghamshire, the northern parts of Lincolnshire and Staffordshire, and sometimes the far south of Northern England. A North Midlands combined authority area was proposed in 2016 for Derbyshire and Nottinghamshire, but cancelled later that year.

== History and extent ==
A North Midlands region was first defined for the 1881 UK census. It was defined as the entirety of Derbyshire, Leicestershire, Lincolnshire, Nottinghamshire and Rutland. A new definition of the region appeared in 1939, for various government statistical purposes: Derbyshire without High Peak, Leicestershire, Lincolnshire, Nottinghamshire, Rutland and the Soke of Peterborough. In 1942, High Peak was added, but it was removed again in 1946. In 1962, it was merged into a new Midlands statistical region.

The North Midlands has remained in use as an informal term for part of the area, covering Derbyshire and Nottinghamshire, the northern parts of Lincolnshire and Staffordshire, and Cheshire and South Yorkshire to a lesser degree, even though Staffordshire, Cheshire and South Yorkshire never formed part of the statistical region. For example, in the 1960s, Sheffield was described in an official publication as "the vigorous shopping and cultural centre of the North Midlands".

The introduction to J. B. Priestley's play An Inspector Calls specifies that it is set in the fictional town of Brumley in the North Midlands.

A somewhat different definition of the North Midlands appeared in David Hackett Fischer's 1989 book Albion's Seed, which detailed migrations from distinct parts of Britain to the American Colonies. It defines the North Midlands as broadly comprising Derbyshire, Cheshire, Lancashire, Nottinghamshire, Staffordshire and Yorkshire.

== Organisations ==
The North Midlands Helicopter Support Unit was operated jointly by Nottinghamshire and Derbyshire Police until 2013, when all police air support functions were taken over by the newly formed National Police Air Service. The service subsequently closed the North Midlands unit in 2016. The University Hospitals of North Midlands NHS Trust operates in Staffordshire and covers the Royal Stoke University Hospital in Stoke-on-Trent and Stafford County Hospital.

A North Midlands Combined Authority was to have been formed in 2017. South Derbyshire District Council, High Peak Borough Council, Amber Valley Borough Council and Erewash Borough Council all voted to reject the proposal, and Chesterfield Borough Council decided to sign up to the South Yorkshire Combined Authority instead.

== Politics ==
The North Midlands covers a part of the red wall; areas traditionally represented by the Labour Party and which voted to Leave the European Union in the 2016 Referendum, and which subsequently swung to the Conservative Party at the 2019 General Election. Constituencies in the region which typified this trend include Bolsover (where the veteran Labour MP since 1970, Dennis Skinner, lost his seat), Bassetlaw (where the largest Labour to Conservative swing occurred), Mansfield, and all three constituencies of city of Stoke-on-Trent.

== See also ==
- Five Burghs
- East Midlands
- South Midlands
- West Midlands
- Northern England
- Southumbrians
