= Staffordshire and Stoke on Trent Partnership NHS Trust =

- Disbanded: 2018
- Budget: £324m
- Hospitals: Burslem community Hospital; Leek community Hospital; Cheadle community Hospital; Longton community Hospital; Bradwell community Hospital
- Chair: David Pearson MBE
- Chief executive: Stuart Poynor
- Staff: 6000
- Website: Staffordshire and Stoke on Trent Partnership

Staffordshire and Stoke On Trent Partnership NHS Trust was the biggest integrated health and social care NHS organisation in England. It intended to become an NHS Foundation Trust, but it was not clear at the time that the rules permitted a social care provider to do so.

The Trust provided community health services and adult social care and ran Community Hospitals in Burslem (Haywood), Leek, Cheadle, Staffordshire, Longton, Staffordshire and Bradwell, Staffordshire and services in prisons.

The Community Hospital was used either after a patient had been discharged from the University Hospital of North Staffordshire or to prevent them needing to go there in the first place.

It was runner up at the Patient Experience Network Awards in the Friends and Family Test category in 2017.

It merged with the South Staffordshire and Shropshire Healthcare NHS Foundation Trust in 2018 forming a new organisation called Midlands Partnership NHS Foundation Trust.

== See also ==
- Healthcare in Staffordshire
- List of NHS trusts
