= County Hospital, Stafford =

County Hospital
- University Hospitals of North Midlands NHS Trust
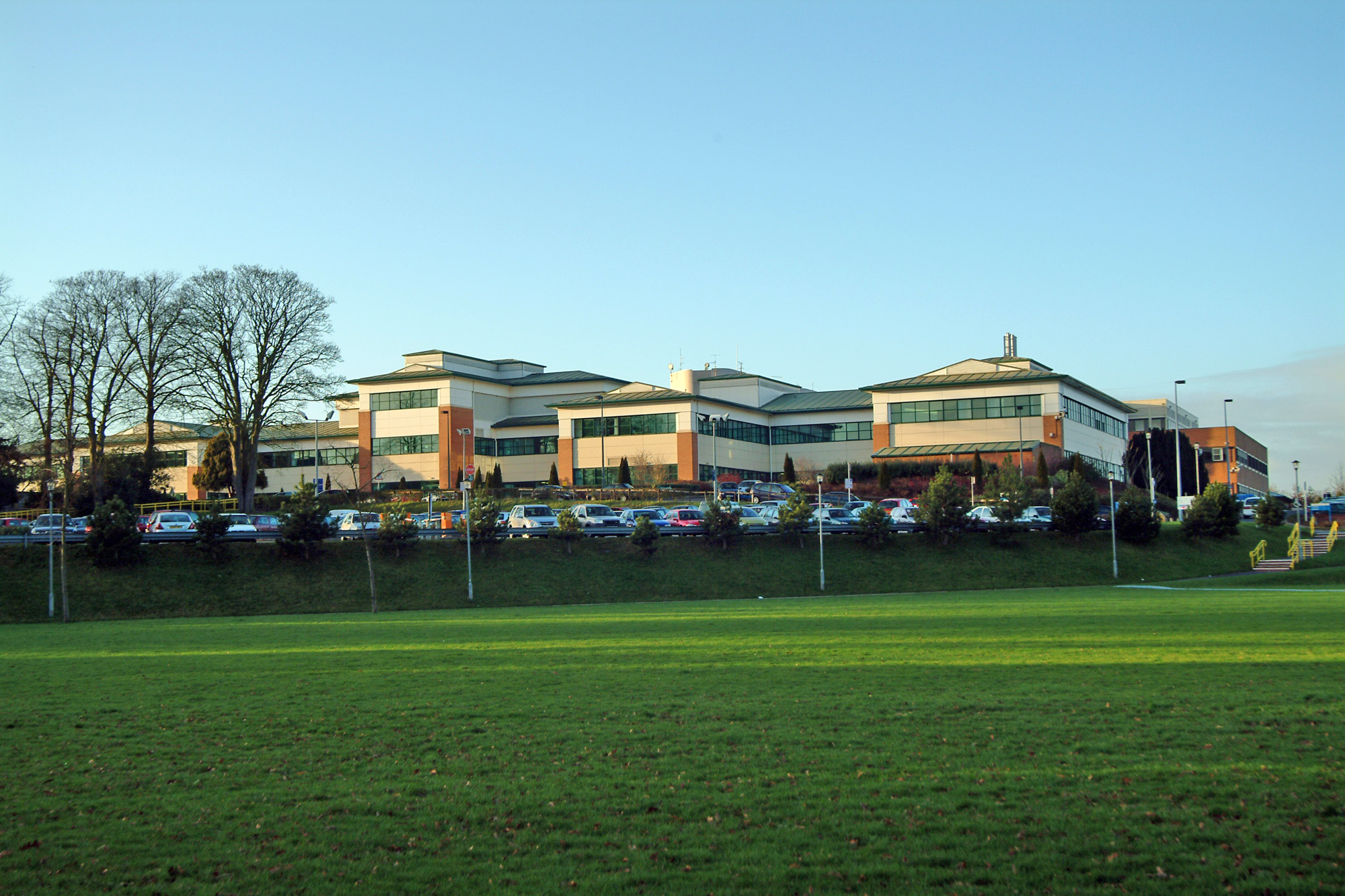
- County Hospital

- Shown in Staffordshire

Geography
- Location: Stafford, Staffordshire, England, United Kingdom
- Coordinates: 52.8107°N 2.0983°W

Organisation
- Care system: Public NHS

Services
- Emergency department: Yes Accident & Emergency
- Beds: 350

History
- Founded: 1983

Links
- Website: http://www.midstaffs.nhs.uk/
- Lists: Hospitals in England

County Hospital is an acute hospital with fewer than 200 inpatient beds, opened in 1983. It is the main hospital in Stafford, England. The hospital is managed by University Hospitals of North Midlands NHS Trust. County Hospital's Accident and Emergency unit is the only such facility in Stafford. Wards at County Hospital are numbered, with the exception of specialist units. The hospital changed its name on 1 November 2014 from Stafford Hospital to County Hospital as part of the dissolution of the Mid Staffordshire NHS Trust.

== History ==
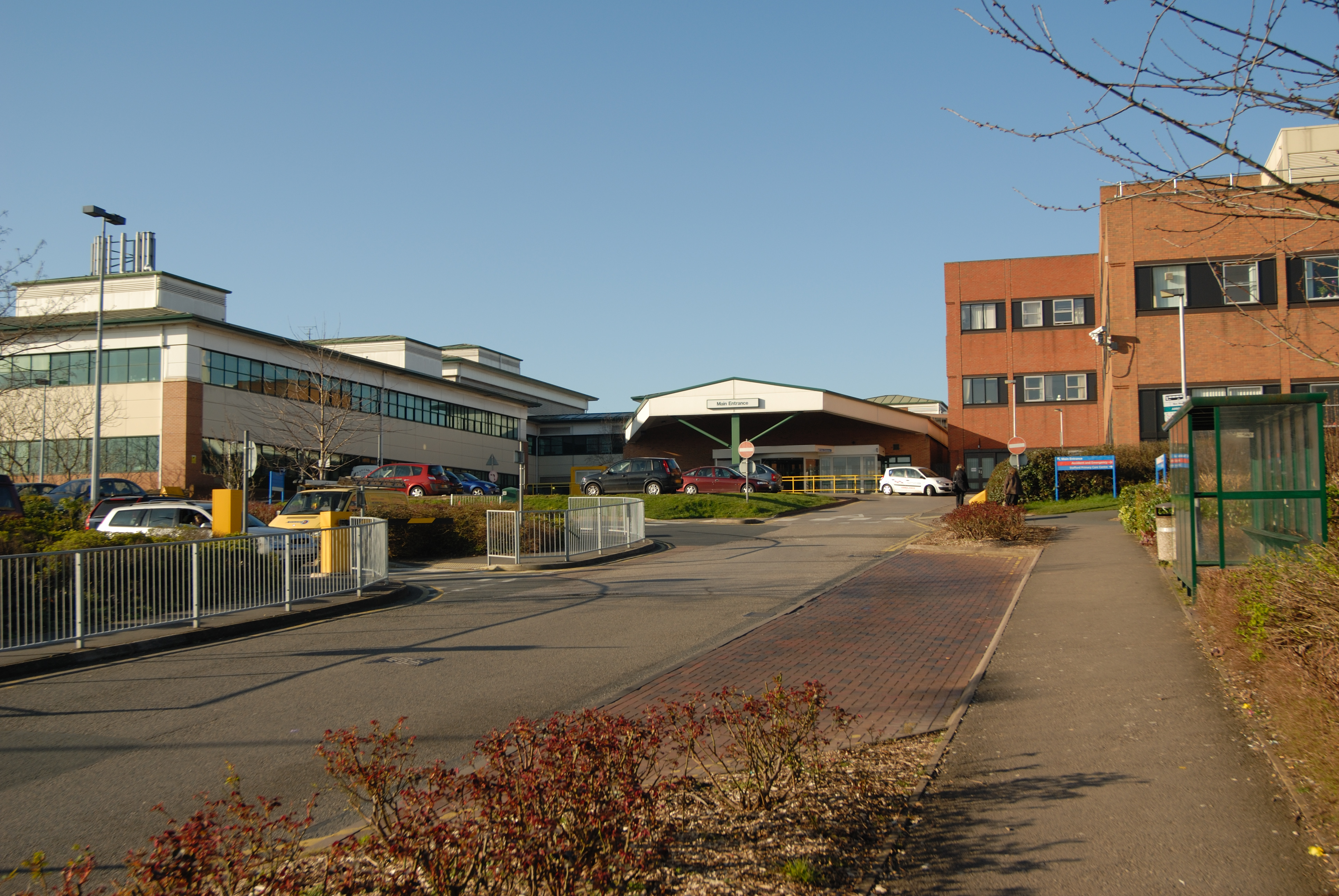
Hospital entrance

This hospital was built on the site of Coton Hill private psychiatric hospital which opened in 1854 and was demolished in 1976 with only the old chapel and gatehouse still visible.

When the County Hospital site opened in 1983 it was named Stafford District General Hospital. The hospital was renamed Staffordshire General Hospital when Staffordshire General Infirmary, also in Stafford, closed in the early 1990s and services transferred.

It was widely described as a "showpiece" hospital on its opening. However, in early 1985 it was the site of the second major outbreak of Legionnaires' disease.

In October 2011 a Care Quality Commission inspection found a lack of suitably trained nursing staff on duty in the accident and emergency department. In consequence the department was closed at night for three months to remedy this, and to allow time for staff development.

In January 2013 a police investigation started following the discovery that a dummy had been taped to a baby's face, allegedly by a member of staff.

In 2013 the hospital's regulator, Monitor, warned the trust was close to insolvent. Over the past five years there had been a 67% drop in the number of patients, largely due to a loss of patient's confidence following the Stafford Hospital scandal, and annual income had fallen by nearly £4 million. Stafford Hospital's mortality rate is now amongst the best within the West Midlands.

In July 2013 two Stafford Hospital nurses were struck off the nursing register for falsifying A&E discharge times between 2000–2010 to avoid breaches of four-hour waiting targets.

In May 2015 it was announced that children's services and eight beds for haematology and oncology patients would be transferred away from the hospital to Royal Stoke University Hospital and Royal Wolverhampton Hospitals NHS Trust as part of larger specialist wards. The day case chemotherapy suite is to undergo a £2m investment in facilities and a new chemotherapy suite will open at Cannock Hospital.

The Accident and Emergency service for children was withdrawn in August 2016 because the trust did not have enough specialist doctors to keep it open, but a minor injury unit for children was opened in October 2016.

In September 2017 it was reported that 45 patients could not be discharged because of the lack of community and domiciliary services. Staffordshire County Council said they could not meet the delayed transfer of care targets.

== Stafford Hospital scandal ==
The hospital has been at the centre of the major scandal in which numerous newspapers estimated that because of the substandard care between 400 and 1,200 more patients died between 2005 and 2008 than would be expected for the type of hospital. In February 2010, an independent investigation recommended that the regulator, Monitor, de-authorise the Foundation Trust status. The official investigation and report showed that the method used to collect mortality statistics was deeply flawed and so gave a false result. The Francis Report had no definite figure for any deaths caused by neglect or poor care.

In June 2010, the new government announced a full public inquiry, expected to report in March 2011. The final report was published on 6 February 2013, making 290 recommendations.

== Support Stafford Hospital ==
Campaigners in the Support Stafford Hospital group led a 50,000-strong march through the centre of Stafford in April 2013 - a rally where protesters waved banners saying "Stafford saved my dad" and "Stafford looks after my son". The group said "We need to have an intensive care unit here, we need to have an accident and emergency 24 hours a day and we believe that's possible". A protest camp with more than 30 tents was established outside the hospital by the group in July 2014. Julian Porter, one of the founders of the camp said he feared increased journey times for patients making the trip from Stafford to one of the other hospitals could risk lives and increase the burden elsewhere.

A meeting was organised by Jeremy Lefroy MP in March 2015 to discuss a leaked KPMG report for NHS England which suggested shrinking the hospital and turning it into a rehabilitation and elective surgery centre. Campaigner Cheryl Porter called for an all-party delegation to London to demand the reinstatement of a fully functioning hospital.

== See also ==
- Healthcare in Staffordshire
- List of hospitals in England
