= Wolverhampton and Midland Counties Eye Infirmary =

- Royal Wolverhampton NHS Trust
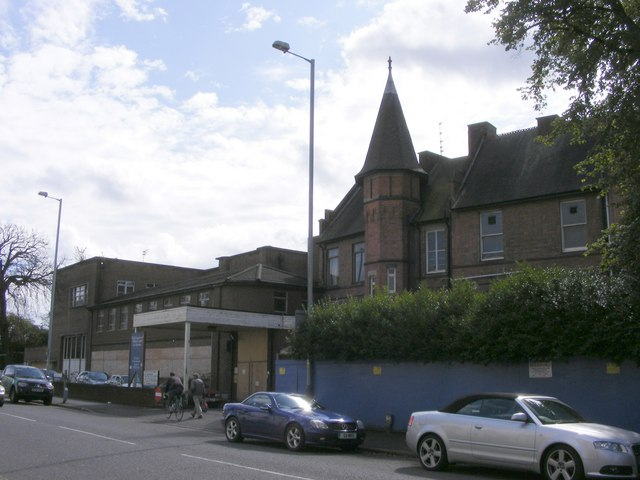
- Wolverhampton and Midland Counties Eye Infirmary

- Shown in West Midlands

Geography
- Location: Compton Road, Wolverhampton, West Midlands, England, United Kingdom
- Coordinates: 52.5853°N 2.1427°W

Organisation
- Care system: Public NHS
- Affiliated university: University of Birmingham

History
- Founded: 1888
- Closed: 2006

Links
- Lists: Hospitals in England

The Wolverhampton & Midland Counties Eye Infirmary was an eye hospital in Compton Road, Wolverhampton, England.

== History ==
The hospital was commissioned with financial support from the local building contractor and philanthropist, Philip Horsman. It was designed by Thomas Henry Fleeing, built in red brick by Henry Willcock & Co. at a cost of £13,000 and was officially opened in 1888. It joined the National Health Service in 1948 and, after services were transferred to New Cross Hospital, it closed in December 2006.
