= Derbyshire Royal Infirmary =

Former hospital in Derby, England

- Derby Teaching Hospitals NHS Foundation Trust
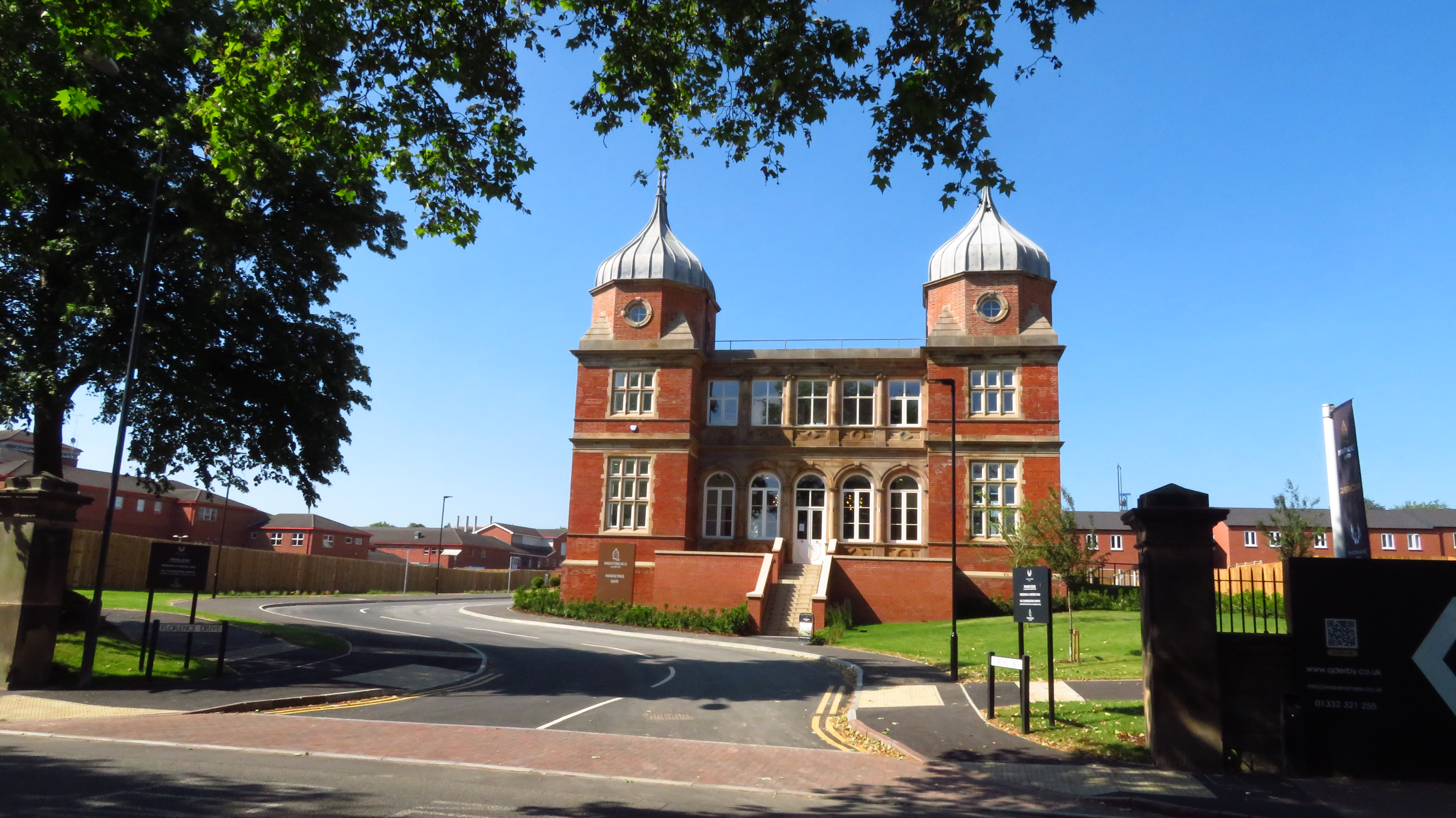
- Pepper Pot Towers

- Shown in Derbyshire

Geography
- Location: Derby, England
- Coordinates: 52.915°N 1.471°W

Organisation
- Care system: NHS

History
- Founded: 1810 (as Derbyshire General Infirmary)
- Closed: 2009

Links
- Lists: Hospitals in England

The Derbyshire Royal Infirmary was a hospital in Derby that opened in 1810. It was managed by the Derby Teaching Hospitals NHS Foundation Trust. Following the transfer of community services to the London Road Community Hospital located further south-east along London Road, the infirmary closed in 2009 and most of the buildings were demolished in spring 2015.

== History ==
=== Derbyshire General Infirmary ===
In early 1803, the Reverend Thomas Gisborne and Isaac Hawkins Browne Esq. (Trustees of the late Isaac Hawkins Esq.) signified their intention to appropriate £5,000 towards an infirmary to be erected at Derby.

On 5 April 1803, following a request from the Grand Jury, the Sheriff of Derbyshire (Robert Wilmot) held a meeting to consider the founding of a hospital in Derby. At this meeting it was noted that subscriptions promised had already reached £17,215, with a further £2,592 and 18 shillings annually.

On 6 October 1803, a committee was appointed consisting of all subscribers of more than £50 and it was decided that the first payment of 25% of more would be required by 12 January 1804.

The infirmary building, principally under the inspiration of the cotton manufacturer, William Strutt, made a deliberate attempt to incorporate into a medical institution the latest "fireproof" building techniques with technology developed for the textile mills. The Infirmary building opened in what is now Bradshaw Way, Derby on 4 June 1810.

=== Derbyshire Royal Infirmary ===
In 1890, during the year that he was Mayor of Derby, Sir Alfred Seale Haslam managed to replace the old Derbyshire General Infirmary with the Derbyshire Royal Infirmary. That year there had been an outbreak of disease at the old infirmary and Sir William Evans, President of the Infirmary arranged a three-day inspection which condemned the old building. When Queen Victoria came to lay a foundation stone for the new hospital on 21 May 1891 she knighted Haslam for his services and gave permission for the term "Royal" to be used. The new Derbyshire Royal Infirmary, designed by the architects Young and Hall, was completed and officially opened in 1894.

In the 2000s, most services were gradually transferred to the new Royal Derby Hospital, leaving only community services on the Infirmary site. Following the transfer of the community services to the London Road Community Hospital located further south-east along London Road, the infirmary closed in 2009 and most of buildings were demolished in spring 2015. However a facade with its two "pepper-pot towers" dating back to 1894 was retained for redevelopment.

A Florence Nightingale stained glass window was commissioned in the late 1950s for the chapel at the Derbyshire Royal Infirmary. During 2010, St Peter's Church, Derby raised £6,000 to rehouse and display the Nightingale window in a back-lit position at the west of the north aisle. On 9 October 2010, the church rededicated the window in a service featuring the Hospital Choir and the Rolls-Royce Male Voice Choir with original music by Dana and Anne de Waal. The Rt Rev Alastair Redfern, Bishop of Derby, presided.

=== Nightingale Quarter ===
Redevelopment on the former site of the Derbyshire Royal Infirmary started in 2020 after initially being halted due to the coronavirus pandemic. Renamed the 'Nightingale Quarter' - after Florence Nightingale - by developer Wavensmere Homes, the new site covers 18.5 acres and includes over 900 new residential properties.

In 2022, Wavensmere Homes appointed Joseph Mews Property Group to bring the first release of these apartments - The Pavilion - to market. The "pepper-pot towers" were turned into on-site amenities for residents including a gym and restaurant, while the existing exteriors were restored.

== Gallery ==
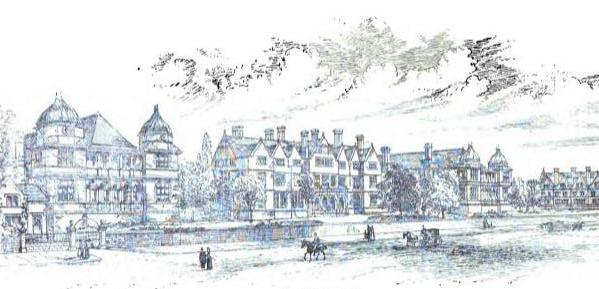
Derbyshire Royal Infirmary in 1891

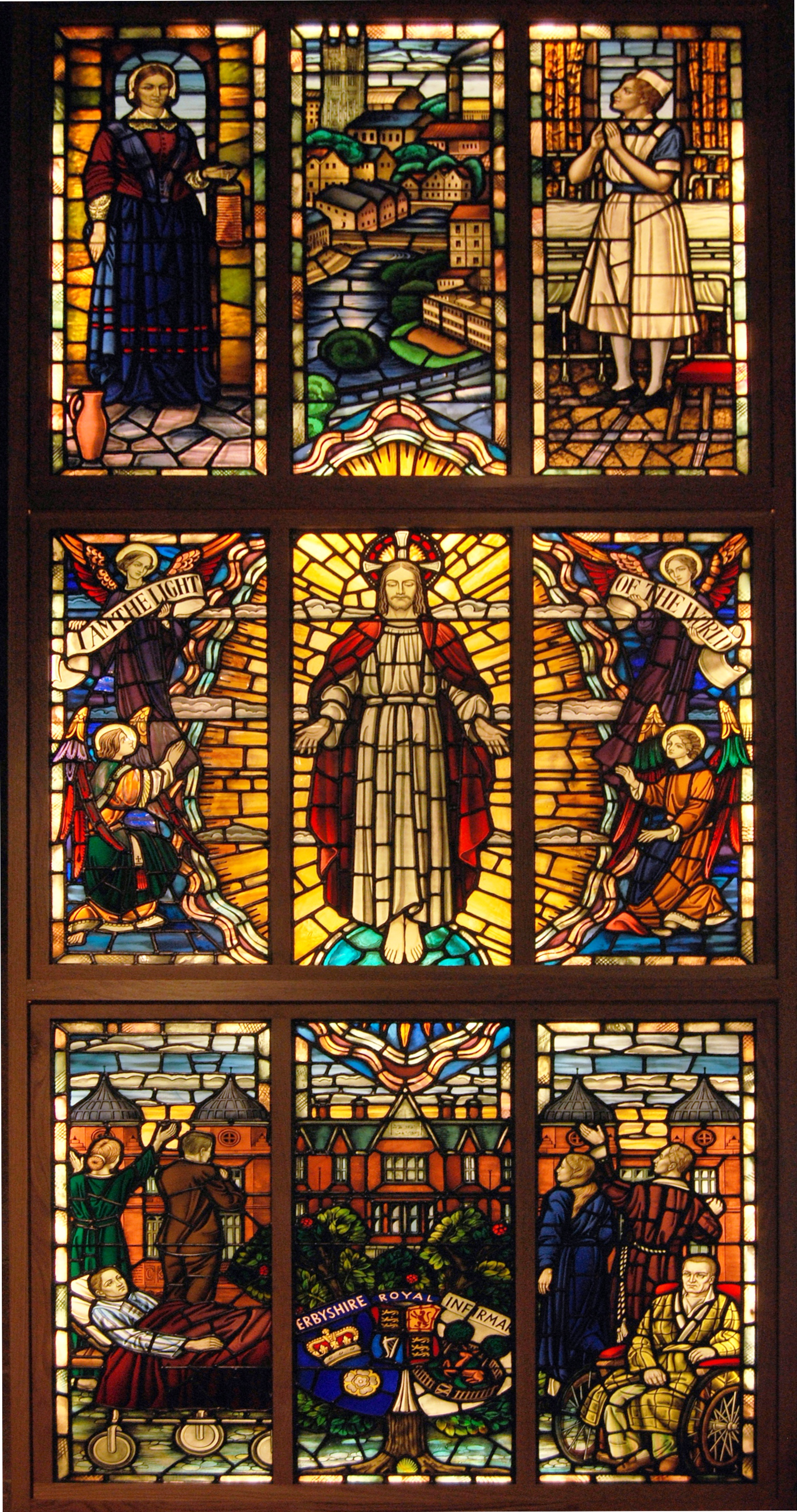
Florence Nightingale stained-glass window, originally at the Royal Infirmary Chapel and now moved to St Peter's Church, Derby

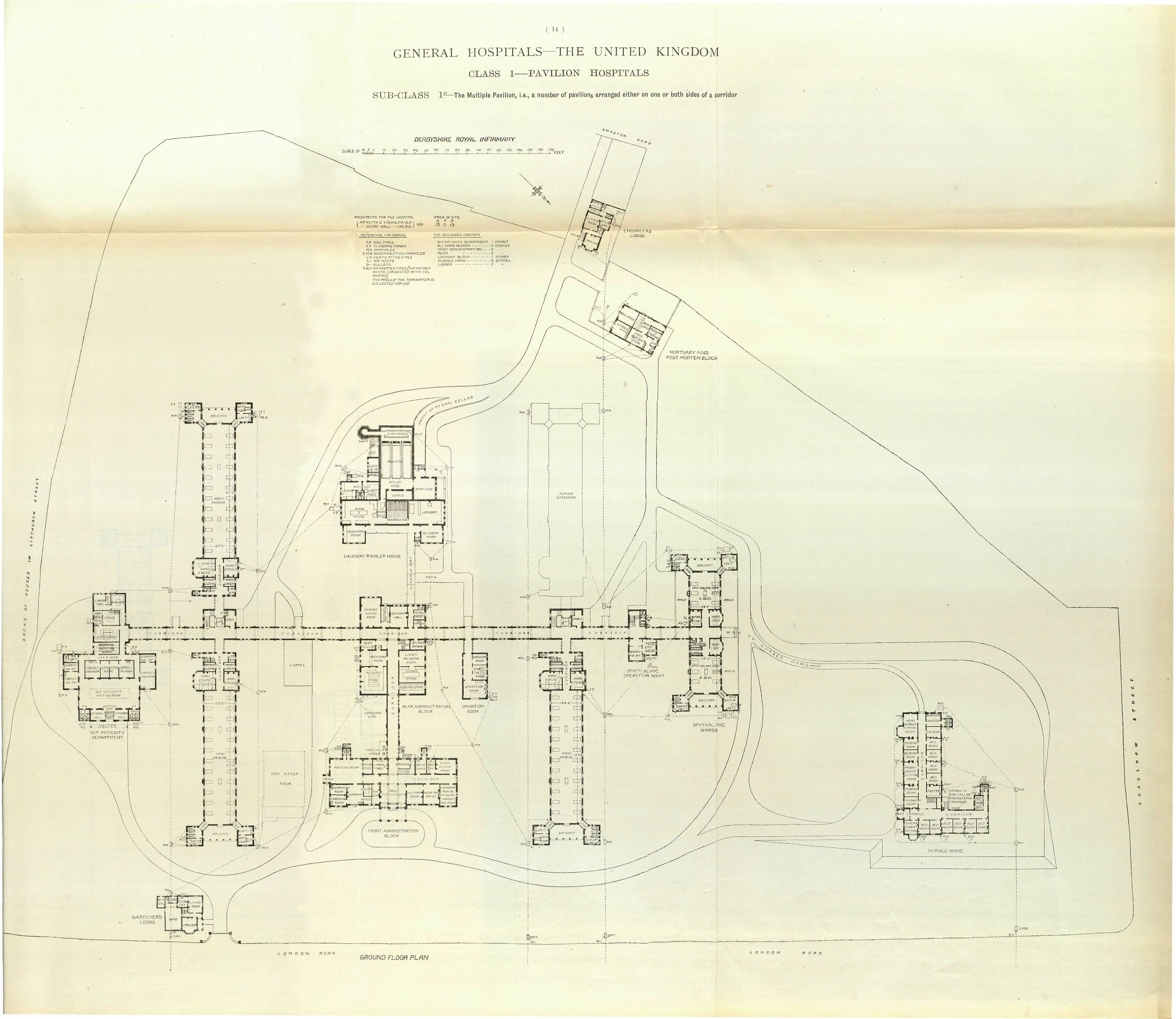
1893 Floor plan of Derbyshire Royal Infirmary

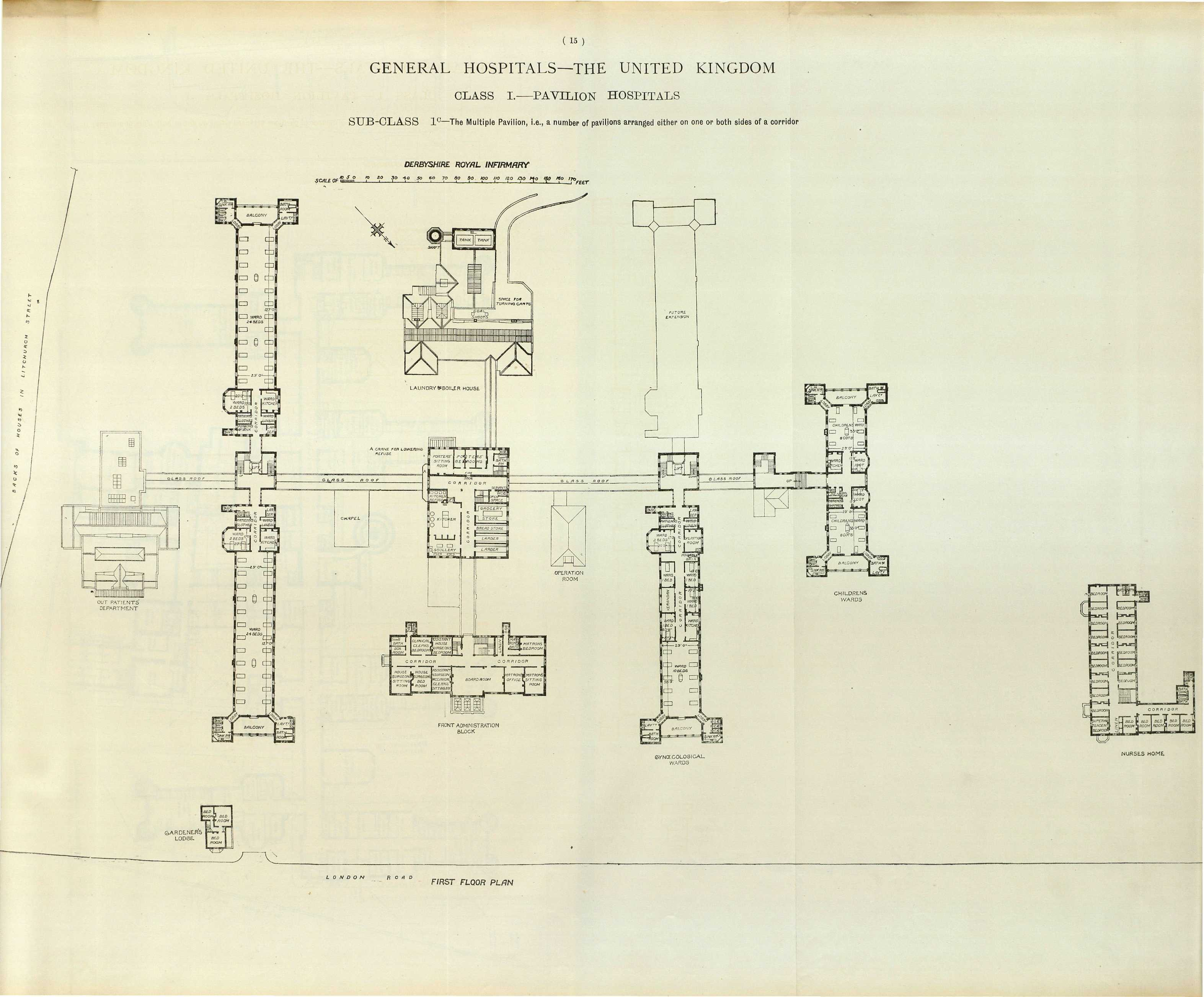
1893 Floor plan of Derbyshire Royal Infirmary

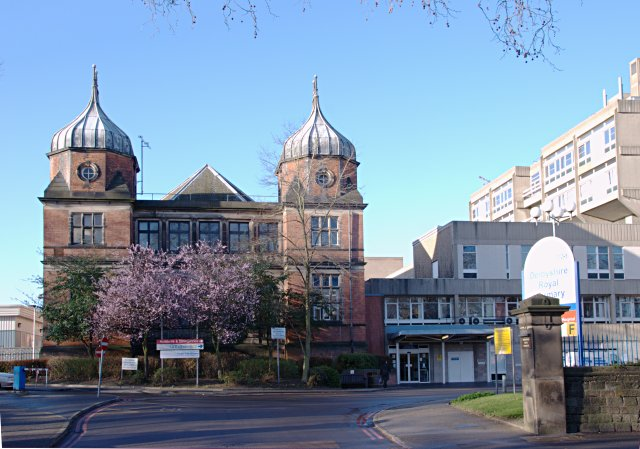
The infirmary in 2009

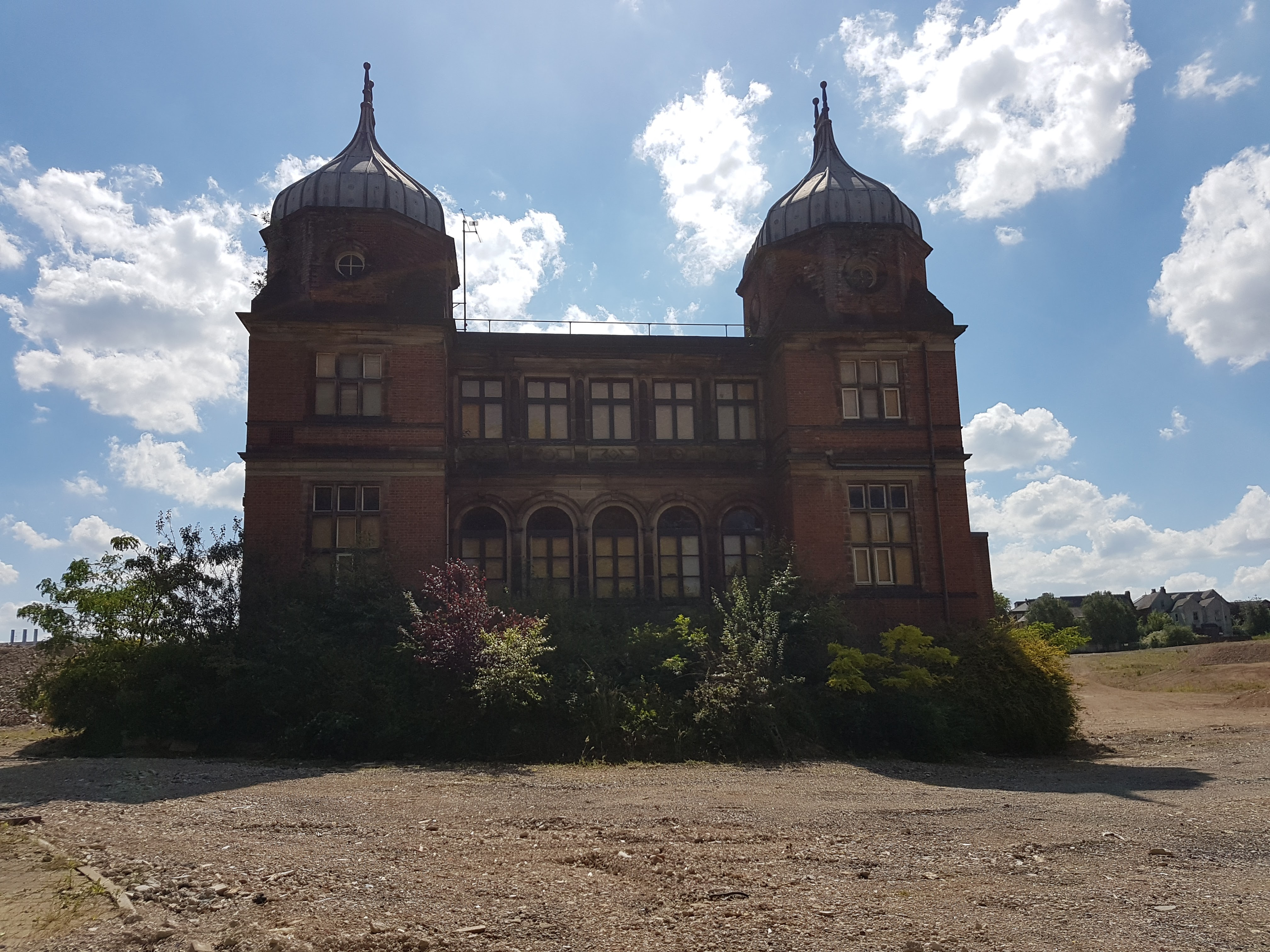
Derbyshire Royal Infirmary in 2017: only the two "pepper-pot towers" remain

== Notable staff ==
Ruth Darbyshire, matron from 1904 to 1913, subsequently Matron-in-Chief of the British Red Cross and Order of St. John of Jerusalem from March 1940 to September 1943

== See also ==
- List of hospitals in England
