= North Staffordshire Royal Infirmary =

- University Hospitals of North Midlands NHS Trust
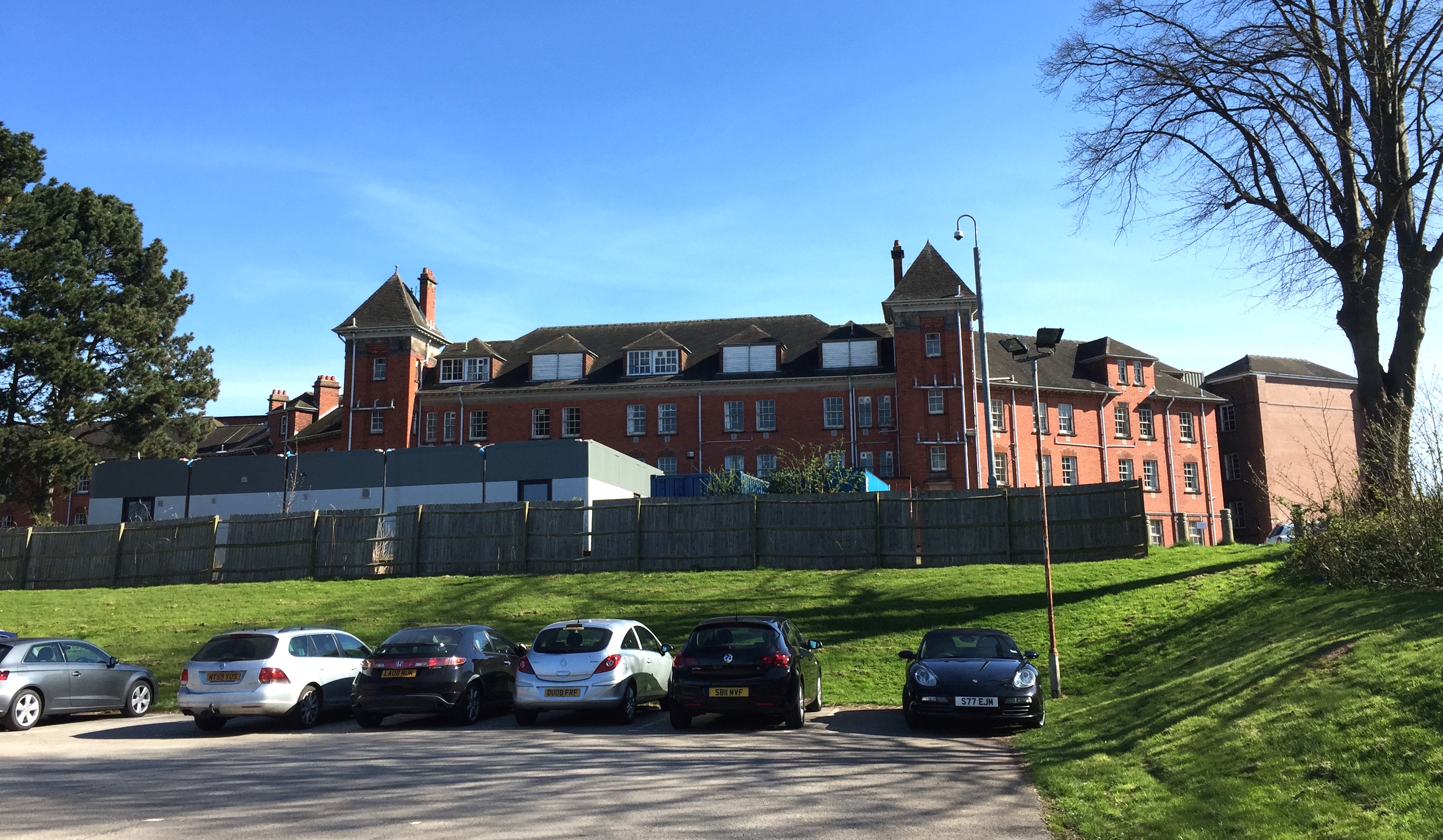
- North Staffordshire Royal Infirmary

- Location within Staffordshire

Geography
- Location: Stoke-on-Trent, Staffordshire, England, United Kingdom
- Coordinates: 53.0053°N 2.1987°W

Organisation
- Care system: Public NHS
- Type: General

History
- Founded: 1804
- Closed: 2012

Links
- Website: http://www.uhns.nhs.uk
- Lists: Hospitals in England

The North Staffordshire Royal Infirmary was a hospital at Hartshill in the English county of Staffordshire. It was located half a mile east of the site of the Royal Stoke University Hospital. It was run by the University Hospitals of North Midlands NHS Trust.

== History ==
The original hospital in the area was established at Etruria in 1804 but was completely rebuilt on a much larger basis in 1814. The hospital then relocated to Hartshill as the North Staffordshire Infirmary in 1869. The Victoria Ward for children dated from 1882 and was originally the ward for the surgical diseases of women. It was decorated with tiled panels and a dado picturing flowers and foliage. The entrance hall of the hospital was tiled with Art Nouveau designs. The hospital became the North Staffordshire Infirmary and Eye Hospital in 1890 and was renamed the North Staffordshire Royal Infirmary following a visit from King George V in 1925.

The facility joined the National Health Service in 1948 and, after services were transferred to the Royal Stoke University Hospital, it closed in December 2012. The site is still used by the University Hospitals of North Midlands NHS Trust for car parking and offices.
