= Derby Teaching Hospitals NHS Foundation Trust =

Chesterfield Royal Hospital NHS Foundation Trust
- Type: NHS hospital trust
- Disbanded: July 2019
- Region served: Cumbria, England
- Budget: £442 million
- Hospitals: Royal Derby Hospital; London Road Hospital
- Chair: Mahmud Nawaz
- Chief executive: Gavin Boyle
- Staff: 8,000
- Website: Teaching Hospitals NHS Foundation Trust Partnership

Derby Teaching Hospitals NHS Foundation Trust was a former NHS trust that ran Royal Derby Hospital and the London Road Community Hospital, both in Derby, together with outpatient and diagnostic services in a range of community hospitals, health centres and GP surgeries across southern Derbyshire, until its merger in July 2018 with Burton Hospitals NHS Foundation Trust, when it created University Hospitals of Derby and Burton NHS Foundation Trust.

The trust had a substantial Private Finance Initiative contract. Innisfree Ltd, ISS Mediclean and Skanska were the partners. Its main hospital, Royal Derby Hospital was built at a cost of £340 million. The repayments on the scheme, £39m a year for 40 years, plus inflation, are set to be well in excess of £1.5bn.

Dr. Nigel Sturrock was appointed medical director of the trust in March 2014.

In February 2015, it was reported that Chief Executive Sue James had cashed in her pension entitlement by "retiring" on 30 March 2014 for 24 hours before being rehired. In response the trust has denied that any rules were broken.

The trust merged with Burton Hospitals NHS Foundation Trust to form University Hospitals of Derby and Burton NHS Foundation Trust in 2018.

== Performance ==
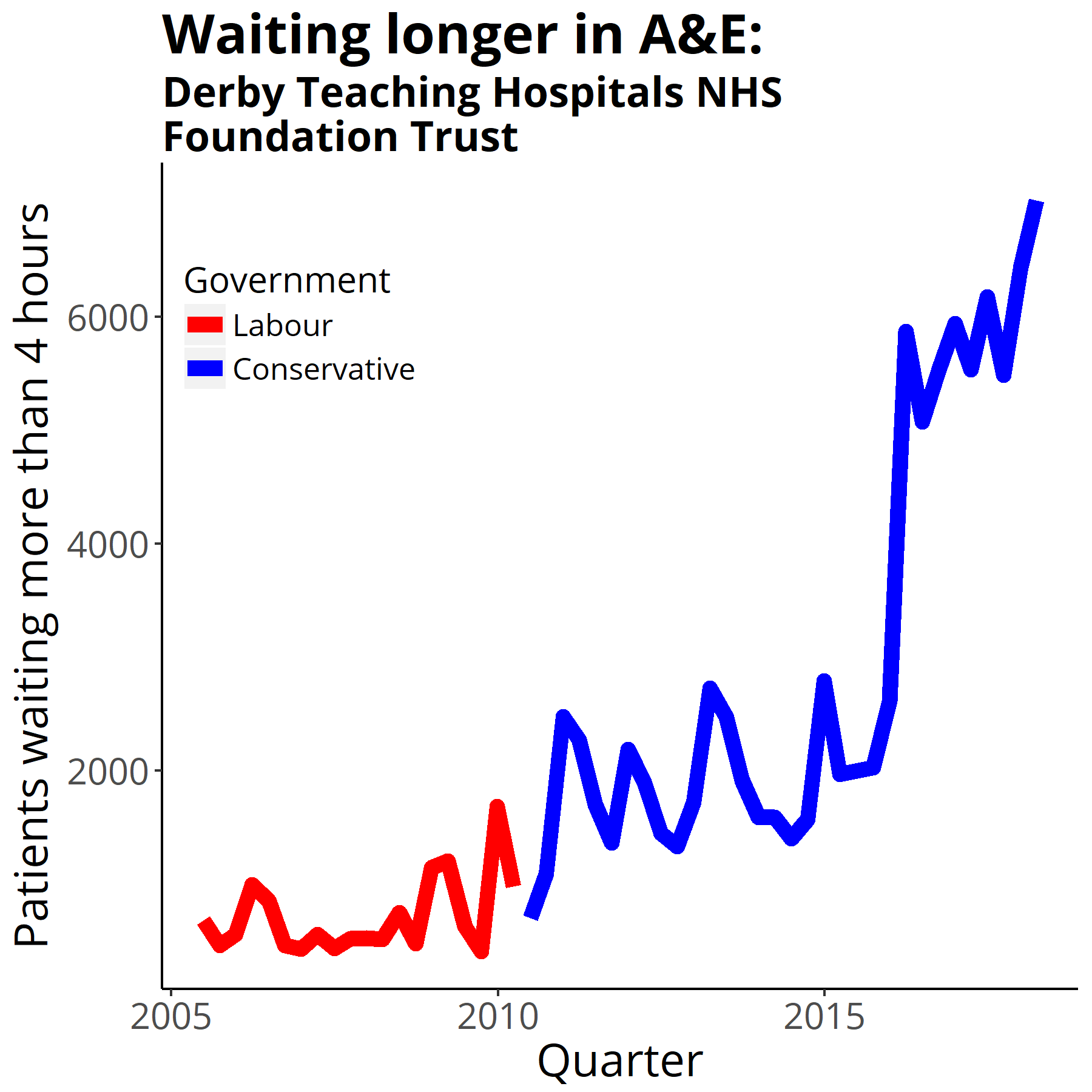
Four-hour target in the emergency department quarterly figures from NHS England Data from https://www.england.nhs.uk/statistics/statistical-work-areas/ae-waiting-times-and-activity/

The trust had a backlog of 7,200 patients waiting for treatment in April 2015, with 1582 waiting over 18 weeks for treatment. The trust plans to send 250 to Nuffield Health Derby Hospital at an estimated cost of £1.25m. More may be sent to Care UK’s Barlborough Treatment Centre.

It expects a deficit of £29 million for 2015/6.

The trust produced a 117 page investigation in December 2015 of the Fit and proper person test in respect of Sue James' former employment at Walsall Healthcare NHS Trust. The report by two independent barristers cost £200,000. It completely exonerates her and describes her performance as chief executive as exemplary and the allegations by Dr David Drew as "misguided". According to the barristers the behaviour of the Care Quality Commission prolonged the investigation and increased its costs.

== See also ==
- List of NHS trusts
