= Burton Hospitals NHS Foundation Trust =

Former UK healthcare trust

- Type: NHS hospital trust
- Established: 1988
- Disbanded: 2018
- Region served: NHS
- Hospitals: Queen’s Hospital; Samuel Johnson Community Hospital; Sir Robert Peel Community Hospital
- Chief executive: Helen Ashley

In July 2018 Burton Hospitals NHS Foundation Trust was part of a merger with Derby Hospitals NHS Foundation Trust, which created the University Hospitals of Derby and Burton NHS Foundation Trust and Burton Hospitals NHS Foundation Trust ceased to exist.

Prior to this, Queen's Hospital in Burton upon Trent, Samuel Johnson Community Hospital at Lichfield and Sir Robert Peel Community Hospital at Tamworth were run by Burton Hospitals NHS Foundation Trust.

The Trust set up a partnership with Health Innovation Partners Ltd., a joint venture of Arcadis NV and Morgan Sindall to manage and develop its estate over 10 years.

The trust is sub-contracted to Virgin Healthcare in a 7-year contract worth for providing long-term and elderly care in East Staffordshire. It had to pay £300,000 in VAT at the end of 2016-17 because Virgin cannot recover VAT costs as NHS organisations can.

The trust merged with Derby Teaching Hospitals NHS Foundation Trust to form University Hospitals of Derby and Burton NHS Foundation Trust in July 2018.

== Performance ==
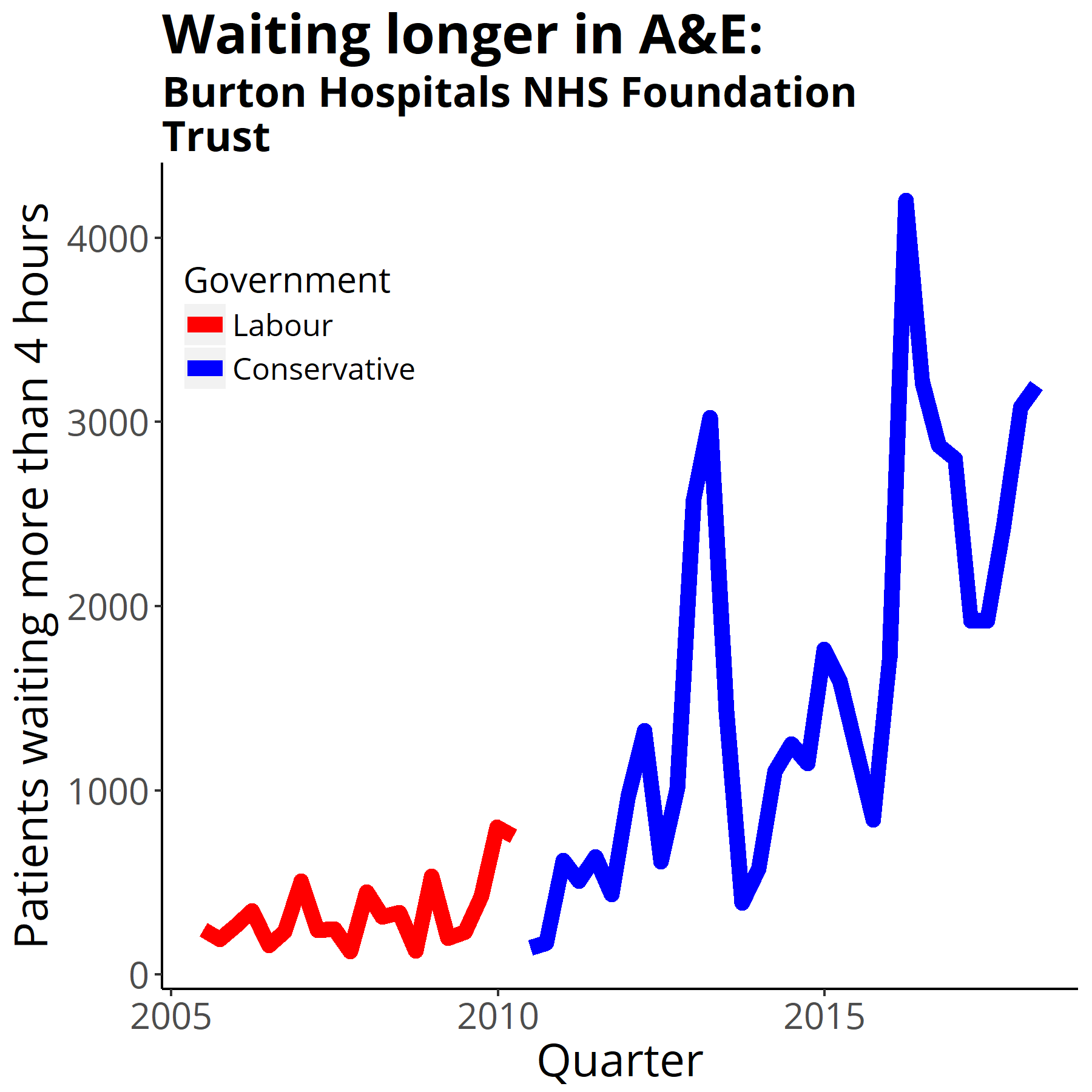
Four-hour target in the emergency department quarterly figures from NHS England Data from https://www.england.nhs.uk/statistics/statistical-work-areas/ae-waiting-times-and-activity/

In July 2013 as a result of the Keogh Review the Trust was put into special measures by Monitor In October 2013 the Trust was put into the highest risk category by the Care Quality Commission. It was put into a buddying arrangement with University Hospitals Birmingham NHS Foundation Trust. Three new non-executive directors were recruited in December 2014 as part of the drive to improve standards. It was taken out of special measures in October 2015 after the CQC agreed that it had improved.

Ten more Italian nurses were recruited in December 2014, joining an earlier contingent recruited from Portugal.

In March 2015 it was reported that the number of staff who have had to take time off for mental health-related problems had increased dramatically. In 2009 1,231 days were taken off for mental illness-related reasons by 56 staff. In 2014, when 223 workers took a total of 7,517 days off. This is about 20% of the total 40,074 days sick leave during the year.

In 2014/5 the trust was given a loan of £6.3 million by the Department of Health which is supposed to be paid back in five years.

== See also ==
- Healthcare in Staffordshire
- List of NHS trusts
