= Luscii =

Dutch medical software company

Luscii healthtech B.V.
- Industry: Medical software
- Founded: January 2019; 7 years ago
- Founder: Dr. Ir. Daan Dohmen
- Headquarters: Utrecht, Netherlands
- Owner: Independent; (2019–24); Omron Healthcare; (2024–present)
- Website: luscii.com/en/

Luscii is a medical software company based in Utrecht, Netherlands.

== History ==
Developed by Dr. Ir. Daan Dohmen in his company FocusCura, it was launched as an independent firm in January with a strategic partnership with Omron Healthcare, the largest manufacturer of blood pressure monitors in the world. It is used in about half the hospitals in the Netherlands and the concept is reimbursed by 94% of insurers.

Their app uses an artificial intelligence clinical engine, Luscii vitals, to monitor a patient's vital signs. This enables more patients to be managed outside hospitals, some in virtual wards. The COVID-19 pandemic gave a huge boost to the use of the technology, as there were huge incentives to keep patients out of hospitals.

It won the Prix Galien Excellence COVID-19 MedTech Award in May 2021 for the rapid development and upscaling of three Covid-related home measurement programs, which enabled healthcare providers to cope more effectively with the pandemic. While the Corona Check app was developed with the Amsterdam OLVG city hospital, the Covid-at-Home app allows patients to be discharged safely five days earlier on average.

Not wanting to confuse its patients or stand between them and care providers, the firm decided to remove its name from the app in July 2021, enabling Luscii-using hospitals to have their name and house style displayed on the app. The first to use this approach, The Canisius-Wilhelemina Ziekenhuis, located in Nijmegen, uses it for people with corona, asthma, diabetes, COPD, heart failure and macular degeneration.

On April 5, 2024, Omron Healthcare announced that it had acquired Luscii.

== Deployment ==
Royal Wolverhampton NHS Trust launched a COVID patient remote ward in 2021 using Luscii. Patients are given an oximeter and enter daily readings into an app which analyses the readings, monitoring for any sign of measurement abnormalities which could mean medical attention is required.

Imperial College Healthcare NHS Trust started using Luscii with heart failure patients who had multiple in-hospital visits over a 2-3 month period in 2021. This gives clinicians daily vitals data and regular questionnaires directly from each patient at home. These patients often find it difficult to get to out-patient appointments.

6,000 people in Bradford and Craven with chronic obstructive pulmonary disease are to be enrolled into the MyCare24 remote monitoring service in 2021/2, led by the digital care hub at Airedale Hospital using Luscii.
