= Mid Staffordshire NHS Foundation Trust =

Former UK healthcare trust

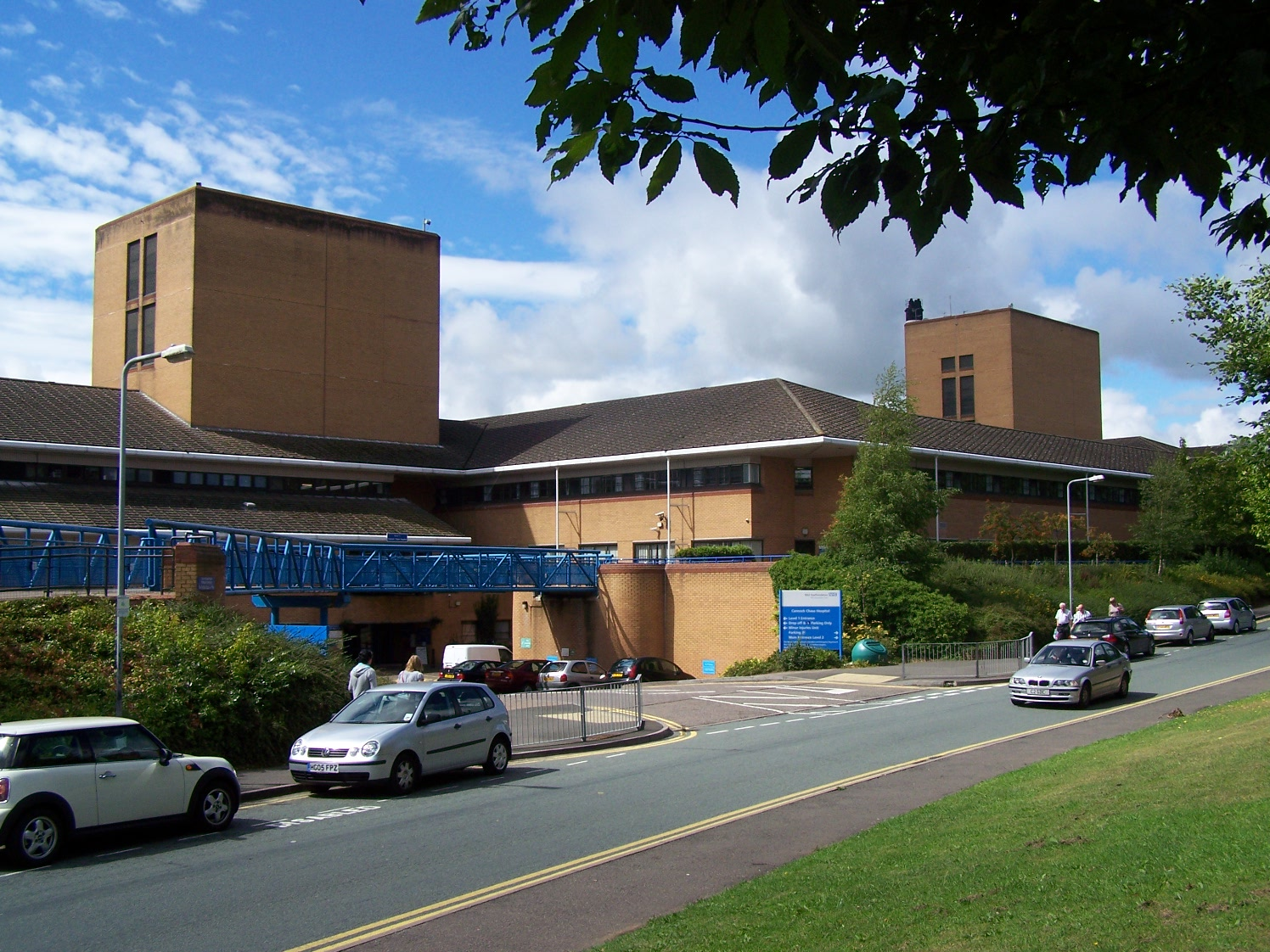
Cannock Chase Hospital

The Mid Staffordshire NHS Foundation Trust was a NHS foundation trust which managed two hospitals in Staffordshire, England:

- Stafford Hospital - acute hospital with approximately 350 inpatient beds, opened in 1983, Now renamed County Hospital.
- Cannock Chase Hospital (52.6925°N 2.0307°W) - approximately 115 inpatient beds, opened in 1991

The trust was awarded NHS foundation trust status on 1 February 2008. Previously it was named Mid Staffordshire General Hospitals NHS Trust, which was created in 1993.

The trust served about 320,000 people from Stafford, Cannock, Rugeley and the surrounding rural areas. About 3,000 employees worked in the two hospitals.

The trust provided services which were formerly commissioned by South Staffordshire Primary Care Trust, which was created in 2006 by a merger of four primary care trusts: Burntwood, Lichfield & Tamworth, Cannock Chase, East Staffordshire and South Western Staffordshire. The trust was in the area covered by the West Midlands Strategic Health Authority.

In 2012, following a £19.9 million annual deficit, the regulator, Monitor, sent in a team to resolve the trust's poor financial situation. This could involve a solvent restructuring of the trust, or to place the trust in special administration. In February 2013 it was confirmed that the process of putting the trust into administration had begun.

In October 2014 it was announced that the Trust would be dissolved with Stafford Hospital to be renamed County Hospital and taken over by the newly constituted University Hospitals of North Midlands NHS Trust. Cannock Chase Hospital would be taken over by Royal Wolverhampton Hospitals NHS Trust.

== Stafford Hospital scandal ==
The trust was at the centre of the major Stafford Hospital scandal in which many press reports claimed that because of the substandard care between 400 and 1200 more patients died between 2005 and 2008 than would be expected for the type of hospital, though in fact such ‘excess’ death statistics did not appear in the final Healthcare Commission report. The 2010 independent investigation report recommended that the regulator, Monitor, de-authorise the Foundation Trust status. In June 2010, the new government announced that a full public inquiry was expected to report in March 2011. The final report was published on 6 February 2013, making 290 recommendations.

== Dissolution ==
It was reported in December 2013 that trust would be dissolved by the end of 2014 with staff transferred to either North Staffordshire or Royal Wolverhampton Hospitals NHS Trust. Accident and emergency services would remain open and a midwife-led maternity unit opened at Stafford Hospital, but consultant-led obstetrics services would move to University Hospital of North Staffordshire NHS Trust. The Trust subsequently reported that senior staff had left and it was unable to recruit permanent replacements so elective surgery would be stopped in order to concentrate resources on urgent care.

Some services will move from Stafford, under the control of Royal Wolverhampton NHS Trust. The cost of the changes is "well over £300m". Mark Hackett, chief executive of the new trust, said the figures were "considerably more" than first estimated. Part of the money will be used to refurbish the A&E department at Stafford, in order to double the space and reduce overcrowding.

In 2017 the two trusts which took over services - Stoke and Wolverhampton - were still looking for extra financial support as the transition funding of more than £300m had expired. Both were in deficit. Ernst & Young were paid more than £3 million for their services during the trust special administration process.

The organisation was not formally abolished until November 2017. It paid out more than £1 million in clinical negligence compensation and £540,000 on court fines and legal fees.

== See also ==
- Healthcare in Staffordshire
- List of NHS trusts
