= North Staffordshire Combined Healthcare NHS Trust =

UK NHS trust

- Type: NHS hospital trust
- Region served: Staffordshire and Stoke on Trent
- Budget: £140 million
- Chair: Janet Dawson
- Chief executive: Buki Adeyemo
- Website: combined.nhs.uk

North Staffordshire Combined Healthcare NHS Trust provides mental health services across Stoke-on-Trent and north Staffordshire, England. It runs the Bungalows, Chebsey Close, Darwin Centre, Harplands Hospital, Florence House and Summer View in Stoke-on-Trent, and Dragon Square Community Unit in Chesterton.

The Trust formerly ran St Edward's Hospital in Cheddleton, an asylum which has now been closed as well as Bucknall Hospital and Stallington Hall which have also closed.

It was established in 1994. It decided in May 2013 that it would not be able to win foundation trust status independently. However with changes to the NHS landscape it is no longer required to do so and was recognised by the CQC as an Outstanding provider of services.

Fiona Myers, the chief executive left the Trust with immediate effect in March 2014.

It took over the running of two GP practices in December 2018.

In 2019 the Care Quality Commission rated the quality of care as outstanding.

== See also ==
- Healthcare in Staffordshire
- List of NHS trusts
