= Steve Field (doctor) =

British doctor

Stephen John Field (born 22 June 1959) is an English general practitioner and Chairman of The Royal Wolverhampton NHS Trust. He was previously Chief Inspector of General Practice (Primary Medical Services and Integrated Care) at England's Care Quality Commission. He is a past chairman of the Royal College of General Practitioners. He is Honorary Professor of Medical Education at the University of Warwick (2002–present) and Honorary Professor in the School of Medicine at the University of Birmingham (2003–present).

== Education ==
He studied at the University of Birmingham, obtaining a medical degree in 1982. He has a master's degree in medical education from the University of Dundee in 2001.

== Career ==
He was a general practitioner at senior partner at the Corbett Medical Centre in Droitwich, Worcestershire from 1987 to 1997 and was a GP principal partner at Bellevue Medical Centre in inner-city Birmingham.

He has published academic papers, reports and books and he has presented papers at academic meetings around the world. He has been a member of the core faculty of the Harvard University's Harvard Macy Institute programme "Leading Innovation in Healthcare & Education", in Boston, USA (2003-2018). He was Regional Postgraduate Dean for the NHS West Midlands (2001–2007).

After producing the curriculum for General Practice training, he became Chairman of the Royal College of General Practitioners (2007–2010). In 2011 he was appointed to lead the NHS Future Forum, an advisory group that David Cameron convened when Andrew Lansley's NHS shakeup became a political liability. He did this from 2011 to 2012. This led to 260 key amendments to the Health and Social Care Act. He then became the chair of the advisory board for the NHS Constitution.

Between 2010 and 2016, he chaired the government's National Inclusion Health Board and helped shape cross-government policy and service delivery to ensure that the reforms across health and social care worked for all members of society, including the most vulnerable.

He worked as Deputy Medical Director for NHS England from 2012 to 2013.

In August 2013, his appointment as the first Chief Inspector of General Practice was announced by the Care Quality Commission; these duties commenced in October 2014. He was responsible for establishing England's first regulatory system for primary care which included general medical and dental practice, out of hours and the new digital healthcare provision. He also oversaw the CQC's integrated care programme. He was said by the Health Service Journal to be the fourteenth most powerful person in the English NHS in December 2014.

In February 2019, he was appointed Chair of The Royal Wolverhampton NHS Trust – an integrated provider of acute, community and primary care services for the people of Wolverhampton and the wider Black Country.

== Honours ==
He has also received honorary degrees from Staffordshire University, University of Worcester, Keele University, Birmingham City University and University of Exeter.

He was appointed CBE for 'Services to Medicine and to Healthcare' in 2010.

Preceded by Mayur Lakhani	Chair of the Royal College of General Practitioners; 2007−2013	Succeeded by Clare Gerada
