= University of Nottingham Medical School =

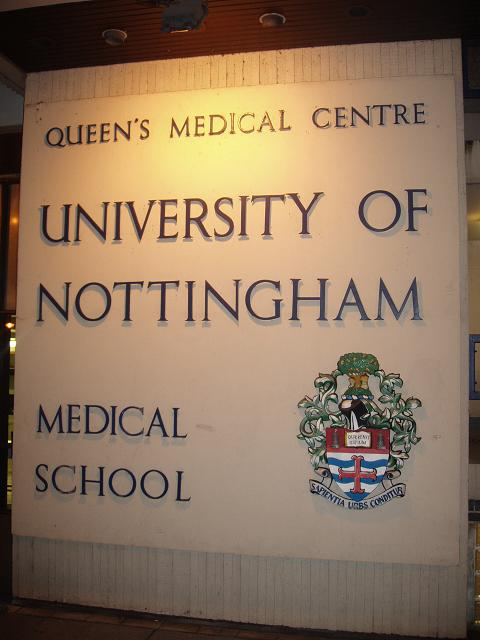
- Type: Medical School
- Established: 1970
- Affiliations: University of Nottingham
- Dean: Claire Stewart
- Students: 330 per year
- Location: Nottingham, England; 52.942°N 1.186°W
- Website: www.nottingham.ac.uk/mhs/

The University of Nottingham Medical School is the medical school of the University of Nottingham, Nottingham, UK. Its first intake of 48 students graduated in 1975. Student intake has steadily increased to a current level of 330 students per year, including 90 from the satellite graduate-entry school at Derby, which opened in 2003.

== Location ==
The Medical School is part of the Queen's Medical Centre campus of Nottingham University Hospitals NHS Trust, located to the west of the city centre. It is located in one of four blocks, the other three being the University Hospital. A pedestrian footbridge connects to University Park Campus of the University of Nottingham. Clinical attachments take place on-site in Queen's Medical Centre, as well as Nottingham City Hospital, Derby Hospitals, King's Mill Hospital (Sutton in Ashfield), Lincoln County Hospital and the Pilgrim Hospital (Boston). Placements in general practice and psychiatry occur across Nottinghamshire, Lincolnshire and South Derbyshire. The graduate-entry school is located at the Royal Derby Hospital.

== Facilities ==
The ground floor of the medical school features the lecture theatres and seminar rooms, medical library, clinical skills laboratory, student lockers, and a coffee bar. The first floor features seminar rooms, administration and faculty office, student services centre, research areas in neurology and healthcare of the elderly, and access to the University via the footbridge and the hospital main entrance via internal corridors. The third to fifth floors feature practical laboratories, biomedical and community health research facilities, and the anatomy suites. All floors link to the other areas of the hospital.

== Course structure ==
The University of Nottingham offers three different routes to qualifying as a doctor.

The main route of entry at Nottingham is the traditional 5 year course, which unlike all other UK medical schools includes an intercalated degree as an integral component. As such, all graduates of the traditional course receive a BMedSci degree as well as the BMBS required to graduate as a doctor; at other medical schools, this would require another year of study.

In the traditional course, Years 1 and 2 are mainly lecture-based, with some small-group teaching, practical sessions, and early patient-based contact in GP practices and hospitals. Subjects include anatomy, physiology, biochemistry, pharmacology, behavioural sciences, pathology, neurology, embryology and an introduction to clinical skills. Courses are taught around the body systems and non-lecture sessions aim to build on the lecture content. The first half of Year 3 features a project in one of the Academic Schools, requiring a 10,000 word dissertation and teaching on research methods and statistics. The second half marks the beginning of the clinical attachments at hospitals throughout the Trent deanery. 'Clinical Phase 1' features an introduction to medicine and surgery. Year 4 (Clinical Phase 2) features the specialities of paediatrics, obstetrics and gynaecology, psychiatry, ophthalmology, ENT (ear, nose and throat), Dermatology, and a 'Special Study Module' of the student's choice. Recent additions to the curriculum are short rotations in Healthcare of the Elderly and General Practice. Year 5 (Clinical Phase 3) features Medicine, Surgery, Musculoskeletal Disorders and Disability (Rheumatology and Orthopaedics), a further rotation in General Practice and a Critical Illness Module (anaesthesia, emergency medicine and intensive care). Final exams are in late February followed by a 7-week Elective period that is taken abroad or in an area of interest. Following this is a short Medical Assistantship ("MAST") course for becoming a Foundation Year One doctor, that includes 6 weeks shadowing.

The Graduate-Entry course at Derby is 4 years long: the first 18 months are pre-clinical and based at Royal Derby Hospital. The course is based around a Problem-Based Learning curriculum, supported with supplemental lectures, as well as workshops to cover anatomy and clinical skills. After 18 months students join the main undergraduate course, who will have just completed their dissertation mid-way through year 3, and start the clinical phases.

The third route is the 6 year foundation course, which is designed to widen access to medicine to promising candidates who may lack the traditional entry requirements. This programme includes an additional foundation year based at Derby, after which the students join the main course at Nottingham and follow the usual curriculum.

== Research ==
Research is one of the key priorities and areas of achievement for the Faculty of Medicine and Health Sciences, and there are a large number of staff belonging to the School of Medicine based at both Nottingham and Derby medical schools who are involved in research. The university has historically taken a pioneering role in the development of Magnetic Resonance Imaging, and current major research themes include cancer and stem cells, child health, obstetrics and gynaecology, clinical neuroscience, digestive diseases, epidemiology, public health, mental health, primary care, rehabilitation and aging, respiratory medicine, vascular and renal medicine, dermatology and musculoskeletal research. In 2014 over 80% of the School of Medicine's research was judged to be "world leading" or "internationally excellent".

During the third year, students on the traditional five-year course undertake their BMedSci research project in an area of interest. This can include taking part in research activities with a supervisor outside the School of Medicine, such as with the School of Health Sciences or the School of Life Sciences.

As with all UK medical schools, graduates are eligible to apply for the Academic Foundation Programme at the end of their course.

== Student life ==
Most students based in Nottingham live in Halls of Residence in the first year and therefore participate in the usual student life of the university, including hall and students' union events on campus and in the city centre. The Medical Society (Medsoc) is the branch of the Students' Union for medical students. It consists of many sub-societies and clubs, and together organises events for all years, including parties, performances, guest lectures and balls. The Medics branch of the University's rag organisation, Karnival, is one of the most successful, and organises events such as the Bed Push, a yearly event in late October where students dress in scrubs and white coats and push hospital beds from the QMC into Old Market Square in Nottingham city centre, stopping motorists and pedestrians on the way and collecting money for charity. The University of Nottingham at Derby (UNAD) runs events and sports for students based at Derby, and there is also a regular "hopper bus" between the two sites.

There are numerous medical school societies, including sports clubs, music and drama groups, and academic organisations such as SCRUBS Surgical Society, INSPIRE Academic Medicine Society. A list of other societies, specifically for medical students can be found on their website. The Nottingham branch of Medsin supports a range of student charities - two of these, Marrow (supporting the Anthony Nolan Trust by encouraging students to join the UK bone marrow register) and the Kenyan Orphan Project (supporting several ventures in Kisumu, Kenya) have since spread to other universities in the UK.

== Graduates ==
Provisional registration with the General Medical Council is granted after graduation, and the student then qualifies to apply to the national Foundation Programme as a newly qualified doctor. Graduates of the medical school join the wider University of Nottingham Alumni Community.
