= Harplands Hospital =

- North Staffordshire Combined Healthcare NHS Trust
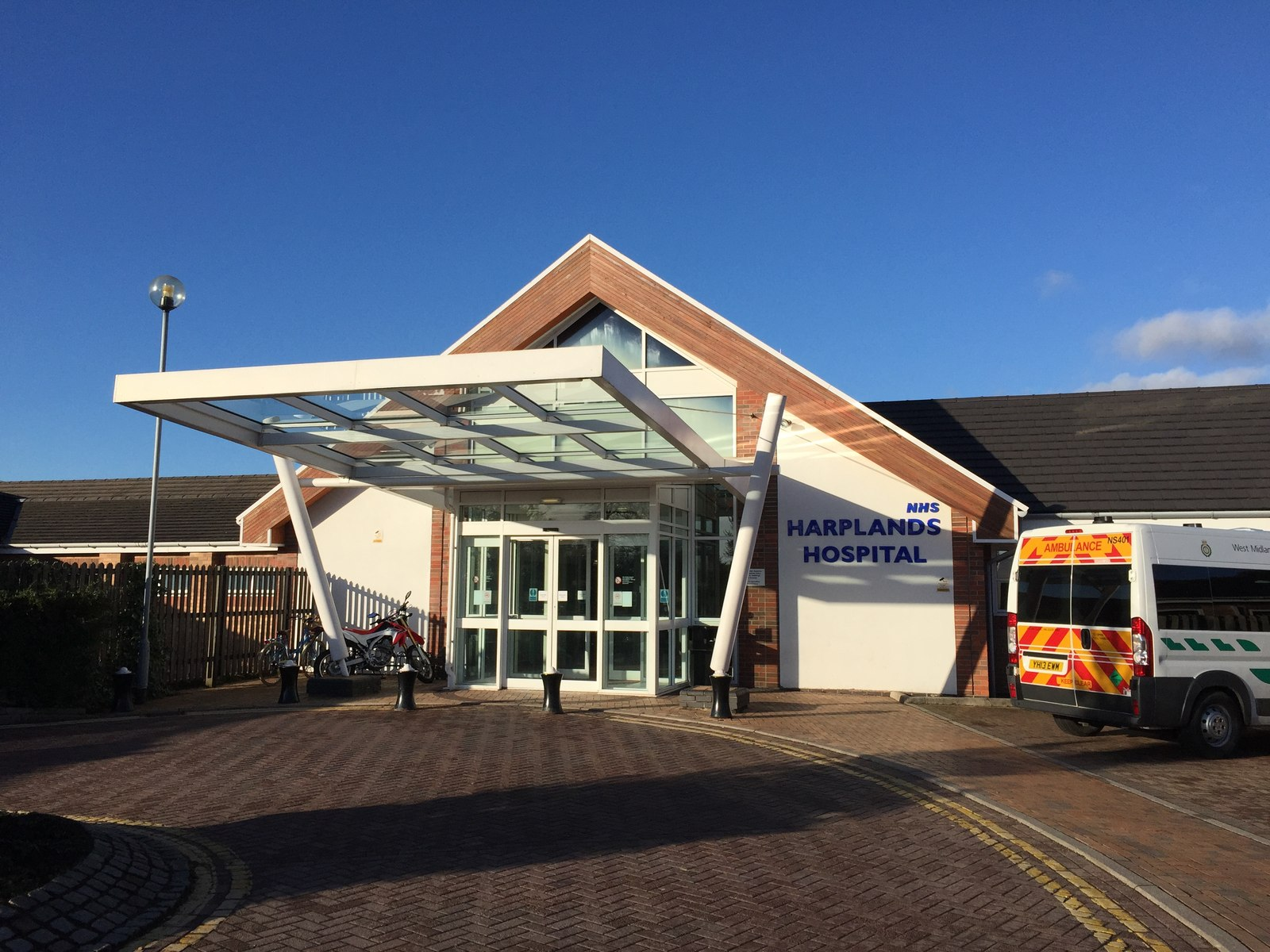
- Main entrance to Harplands Hospital

- Shown in Staffordshire

Geography
- Location: Stoke-on-Trent, England, United Kingdom
- Coordinates: 53.00047°N 2.21043°W

Organisation
- Care system: NHS
- Type: Mental health facility

Services
- Beds: 150

History
- Founded: 2001

Links
- Website: www.combined.nhs.uk
- Lists: Hospitals in England

Harplands Hospital is a mental health facility in Stoke-on-Trent operated by the North Staffordshire Combined Healthcare NHS Trust.

== History ==
The hospital replaced the existing Victorian mental health facilities in the area. It was designed by TPS Consult, built by Carillion under a PFI contract and was completed in 2001. The clinical commissioning for the hospital, which provides 150 beds, was carried out by United Medical Enterprises. The hospital provides treatment for a variety of mental health issues including bipolar disorder.
