= South Staffordshire and Shropshire Healthcare NHS Foundation Trust =

- Type: NHS hospital trust
- Chair: Martin Gower
- Chief executive: Neil Carr

South Staffordshire and Shropshire Healthcare NHS Foundation Trust ran the Birmingham Inpatient Drug Treatment Service, The Redwoods Centre, Oak House, and Elms House in Shrewsbury, St George's Hospital and the Flanagan Centre, Stafford, George Bryan Centre in Tamworth, Castle Lodge in Telford.

It closed the Margaret Stanhope Centre in Burton on Trent in 2012 and has been criticised for reducing mental health provision for the town. Castle Lodge, in Dawley has also been closed temporarily and that has provoked a review of mental health services in Telford.

In March 2015, Hampshire County Council awarded the trust's Inclusion Drug Services a £41.3m contract for adult substance misuse services previously provided by Solent NHS Trust. Solent claimed there had been a serious error in the scoring of their bid. They entered into a procurement dispute.

It was named by the Health Service Journal as one of the top hundred NHS trusts to work for in 2015. At that time, it had 3008 full-time equivalent staff and a sickness absence rate of 4.68%. 61% of staff recommended it as a place for treatment and 56% recommended it as a place to work.

The trust used Healios, an online cognitive behavioural therapy platform, for children and adolescents suffering from anxiety.

It merged with the Staffordshire and Stoke-on-Trent Partnership NHS Trust in 2018 forming a new organisation called Midlands Partnership NHS Foundation Trust.

== See also ==
- Healthcare in Staffordshire
- List of NHS trusts
