= Cannock Chase Hospital =

- Royal Wolverhampton NHS Trust
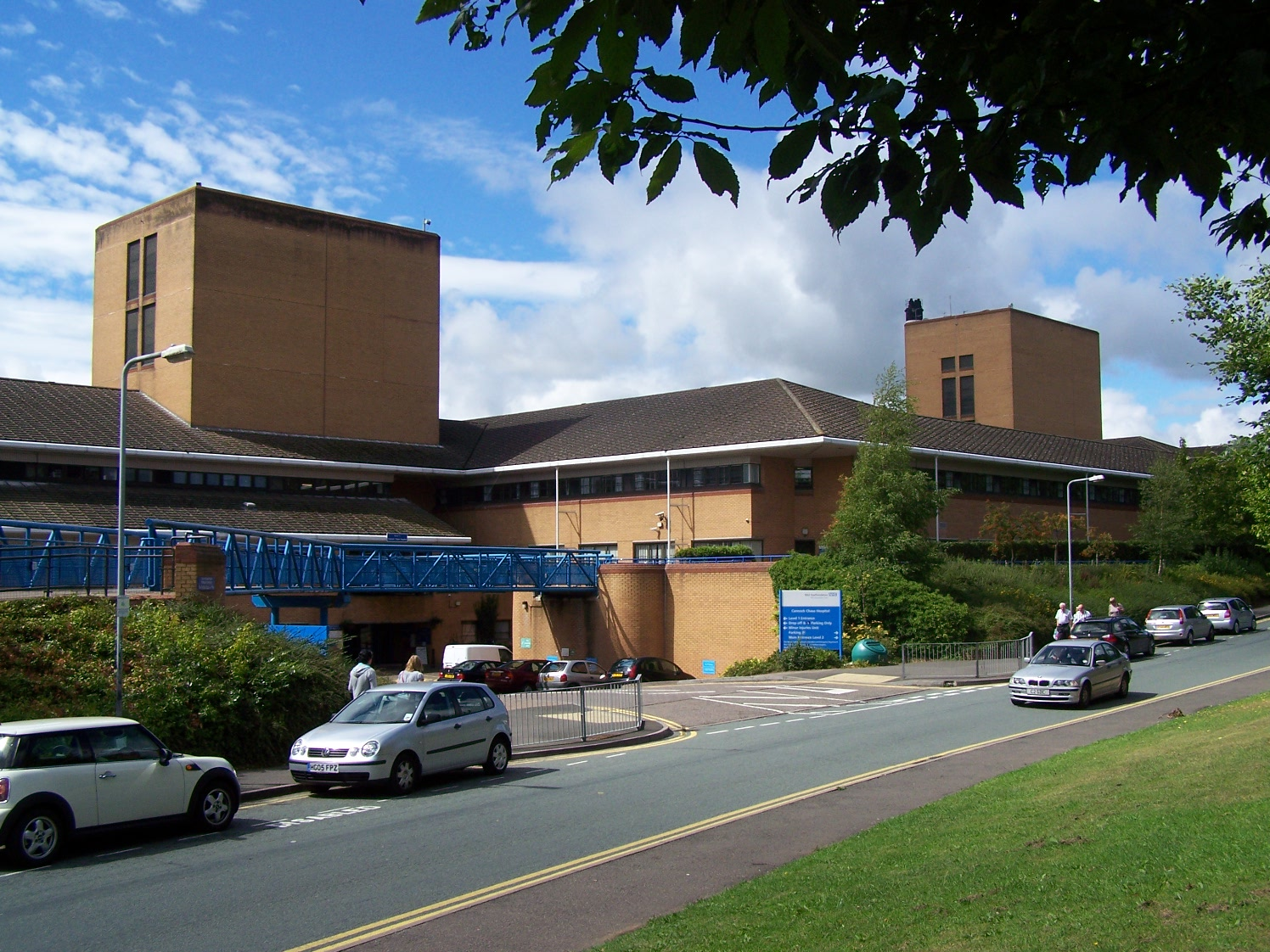
- Cannock Chase Hospital

- Shown in Staffordshire

Geography
- Location: Cannock Chase, Staffordshire, England, United Kingdom
- Coordinates: 52.6926°N 2.0303°W

Organisation
- Care system: Public NHS
- Type: Community

History
- Founded: 1991

Links
- Website: www.royalwolverhampton.nhs.uk
- Lists: Hospitals in England

Cannock Chase Hospital is a community hospital in Cannock Chase, Staffordshire. It is managed by Royal Wolverhampton NHS Trust.

== History ==
The facility has its origins in an infirmary built for the Cannock Chase Workhouse in 1870. The infirmary was completely rebuilt in 1902. This facility joined the National Health Service in 1948 as Chase Hospital. The current hospital, which replaced the aging Chase Hospital and was managed by Mid Staffordshire NHS Trust, was completed in 1991. In October 2014 it was announced that Cannock Chase Hospital would be transferred to the management of the Royal Wolverhampton NHS Trust.
