= University Hospitals of North Midlands NHS Trust =

NHS hospital trust

The University Hospitals of North Midlands NHS Trust was created on 1 November 2014. It runs Royal Stoke University Hospital, formerly run by the University Hospital of North Staffordshire NHS Trust and the County Hospital (formerly Stafford Hospital). It was formed after the dissolution of Mid Staffordshire NHS Foundation Trust. The trust is currently under the leadership of chair Jacqueline Small and chief executive Dr Simon Constable

== Current operations ==
The trust operates on three sites in Stoke and one in Stafford. Most departments in Stoke are on the Royal Stoke University Hospital site with some residual functions on the old Royal Infirmary site. A separate central outpatients department is in Hartshill between the two hospital sites.

One of the Trust's first decisions was that 60 beds were to be reopened at the County Hospital. Ten consultants and an extra 200 nurses have been recruited. Paediatrics, consultant-led maternity and acute surgery will move from Stafford to Stoke. £150m will be spent at Stafford, doubling the size of the casualty department, expanding outpatient facilities, refurbishing wards and opening a new theatre. Stafford will get a new MRI scanner and possibly a new eye surgery unit.

The board is one of the first organisations in the UK to make wifi available in its hospitals, on the basis that enables patients to stay in touch with their family and friends, and improves the way it interacts with patients.

In January 2015 bed occupancy for general and acute wards was at 100%. In February it was 97%, March 99%, April 97%, May 92%. The trust, which had 1,500 beds, planned to open 56 more beds on the Stoke site.

The trust had 4,000-plus compliments (many from A&E patients) in 2015 and 800 formal complaints.

The GP streaming service in the A&E department was run by Vocare, but after a Care Quality Commission inspection in 2018 the trust took it over, at least temporarily.

== Performance ==
The trust expected to finish 2015–16 with a deficit of more than £20 million as a result of changes to the NHS tariff.

The A&E department at Royal Stoke University Hospital in December 2017 was described as suffering Third World conditions due to overcrowding. The corridors were said to be so crowded with trolleys it was hard to walk down them and a shortage of cubicles meant patients were seen in disabled toilets. Only 77.5% of A&E patients were seen within four hours during 2017–18.

The Care Quality Commission imposed conditions on the trust in July 2019 "in relation to observations within the emergency department regarding appropriate and timely clinical assessment on arrival, and actions taken to ensure that patients detained under the Mental Health Act would have their rights protected".

== Development ==
The trust was one of the beneficiaries of Boris Johnson's announcement of capital funding for the NHS in August 2019, with an allocation of £17.6 million for three new wards delivering 84 beds.

== See also ==
- Healthcare in Staffordshire
- List of NHS trusts
