= University of Nottingham Medical School at Derby =

Coordinates: 52.9091°N 1.5128°W

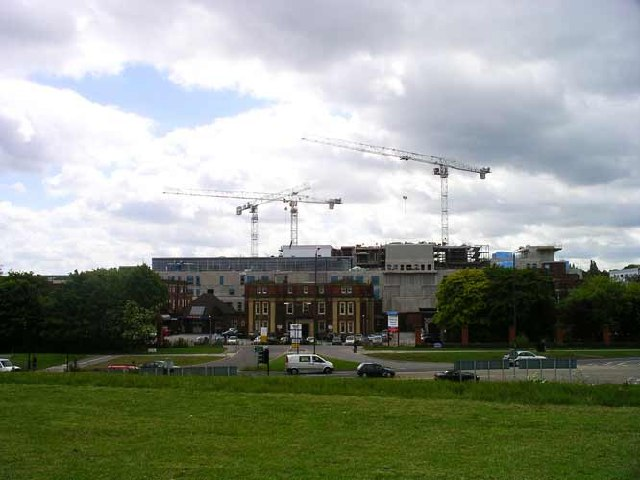
Rebuilding at the Derby site

The University of Nottingham Medical School at Derby was opened in September 2003 by Dr John Reid, then Secretary of State for Health. It is part of the University of Nottingham and is located in the nearby city of Derby in the East Midlands of England. It offers a four-year Graduate Entry Medical (GEM) course (initially for 90 students) as well as a 3-year Undergraduate Medical Physiology and Therapeutics degree (available as a 4-year foundation degree) as well. It is currently led (2015- ) by Professor John Alcolado.

The medical school is attached to the Royal Derby Hospital and houses a lecture theatre, anatomy suite and clinical skills teaching facility. Additionally, students have assigned problem-based learning base rooms.

Entrance to the GEM course is via the GAMSAT examination followed by a structured interview process. Competition for places is fierce, with usually over 1200 students applying for the 90 places. The course accepts people from both science and non-science degree backgrounds.

The course consists of a 1 1/2-year pre-clinical phase which is centred on problem-based learning cases. Following successful completion of this course, students then join with the five-year course students for a 2 1/2-year clinical phase.
