= New Cross Hospital =

- Royal Wolverhampton NHS Trust
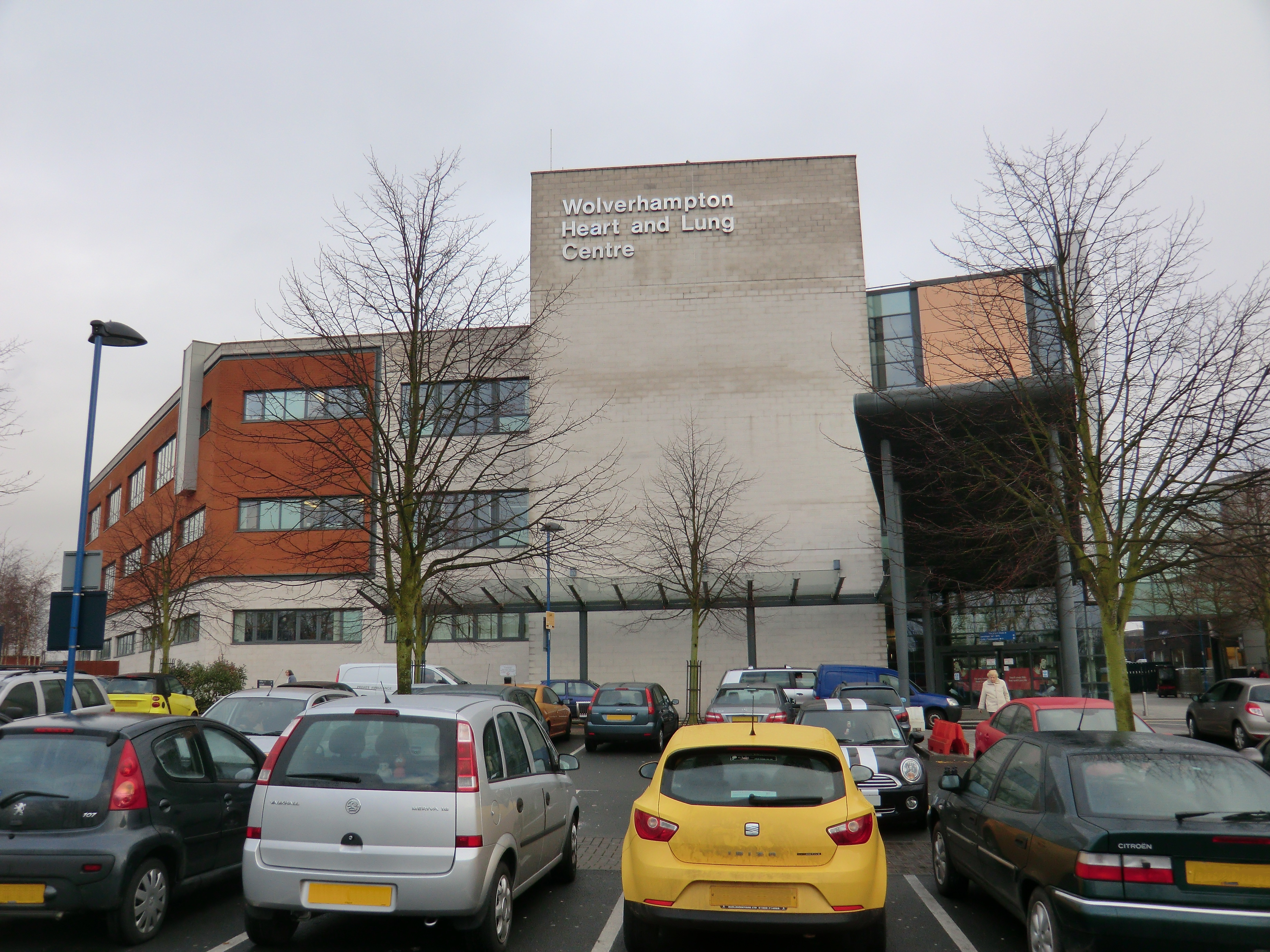
- Heart and Lung Centre

- Shown in West Midlands

Geography
- Location: Heath Town, Wolverhampton, West Midlands, England, United Kingdom
- Coordinates: 52.5988°N 2.0949°W

Organisation
- Care system: Public NHS
- Affiliated university: University of Birmingham

History
- Founded: 1903

Links
- Website: www.royalwolverhampton.nhs.uk
- Lists: Hospitals in England

New Cross Hospital is a hospital in the Heath Town district of Wolverhampton, West Midlands, England. It is located to the east of the city centre in Wednesfield and is managed by the Royal Wolverhampton NHS Trust.

== History ==
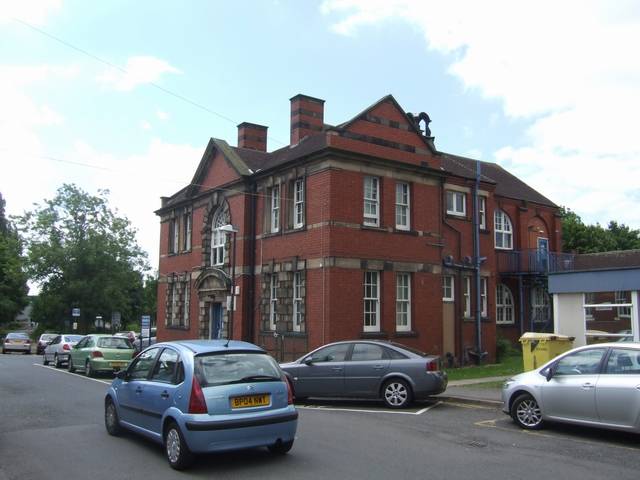
The Workhouse Board Offices

The hospital has its origins in the local workhouse designed by Arthur Marshall; the foundation stone was laid by the chairman of the Board of Guardians in September 1900 and it opened in September 1903. The design ensured that the workhouse had infirmary facilities in the north end of the site and the infirmary joined the National Health Service as the New Cross Hospital in 1948.

The first phase of the modern hospital, built by Alfred McAlpine, was completed in 1970. It became the main acute general hospital for Wolverhampton when the Royal Hospital closed in June 1997.

In October 2004 a Heart and Lung Centre costing £57 million was opened on the site, the United Kingdom's first purpose-built specialist heart centre. In November 2015 a new accident and emergency facility, built by Kier Group and costing £38 million, opened at the hospital.

Also located on the site is the Wolverhampton and Midland Counties Eye Infirmary. This is named after the formerly separate building of the same name which was located in Chapel Ash just to the west of the city centre which closed in December 2006.

== See also ==
- List of hospitals in England

== Sources ==
- Gray, Tony (1987). The Road to Success: Alfred McAlpine 1935 - 1985. Rainbird Publishing.
