= Burton upon Trent Infirmary =

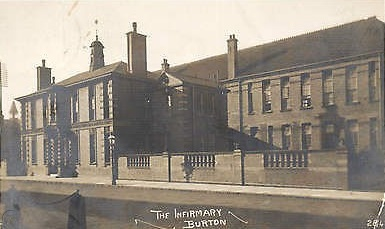
- Burton upon Trent Infirmary

- Shown in Staffordshire

Geography
- Location: Duke Street, Burton upon Trent, Staffordshire, England
- Coordinates: 52.8023°N 1.6368°W

Organisation
- Care system: National Health Service
- Type: General

History
- Founded: 1869
- Closed: 1993

Links
- Lists: Hospitals in England

Burton upon Trent Infirmary was a health facility in Duke Street, Burton upon Trent, Staffordshire, England.

== History ==
The facility, which was designed by architect Edward Holmes, opened in October 1869. The infirmary's first President was the Marquess of Anglesey who also had been the previous owner of the site. It was expanded to a design by Aston Webb in 1899 in such a way that the building extended right back to New Street. Following further expansion in 1924, 1931 and 1942, it joined the National Health Service in 1948. After services had been transferred to Queen's Hospital, the ageing infirmary closed in 1993; the buildings were demolished in 1994 and the site was redeveloped for residential use.
