= One Health Group =

Healthcare Provider

One Health Group PLC
- Type: Public
- Traded as: AQSE: OHGR.
- Industry: Healthcare
- Founded: 18 April 2001; 25 years ago
- Founder: Derek Bickerstaff
- Headquarters: Sheffield, United Kingdom
- Area served: Northern England
- Key people: Adam Binns (Chief Executive); Derek Bickerstaff (Chairman)
- Number of employees: 50
- Website: https://www.onehealth.co.uk/

One Health Group is an independent provider of elective surgical care based in Yorkshire, United Kingdom. The company offers services across South Yorkshire, Derbyshire, Nottinghamshire, West Yorkshire, Lincolnshire and Hull. Providing treatments in Orthopaedics, Spines, General Surgery and Gynaecology, the company sees approximately 12,000 new patients annually and has over 100 self-employed NHS surgeons as part of their network.

One Health Group operates in conjunction with a number of NHS commissioners across the north of England, with services directly commissioned by NHS trusts and provided through the NHS e-Referral Service.

The company works at over 30 clinics and performs surgeries at private hospitals owned by Circle Health, Spire Healthcare, and Practice Plus Group

One Health Group is a member of the Independent Healthcare Providers Network

== History ==
One Health Group was founded in 2000 by orthopaedic surgeon Derek Bickerstaff as The Windsor Sports Injury Clinic Limited.

Adam Binns was appointed CEO in 2019.

The company was the subject of an initial public offering on the AQSE Growth Market in November 2022, raising £1.5m.

In 2023 the company was awarded contracts to provide services to Barnsley Hospital NHS Foundation Trust and University Hospitals of Derby and Burton NHS Foundation Trust.

== See also ==
- Private healthcare in the United Kingdom
- Circle Health
- Spire Healthcare
- Practice Plus Group
- Ramsay Health Care UK
