= Mayur Lakhani =

British doctor (born 1960)

Sir Mayur Lakhani CBE FRCP FRCGP
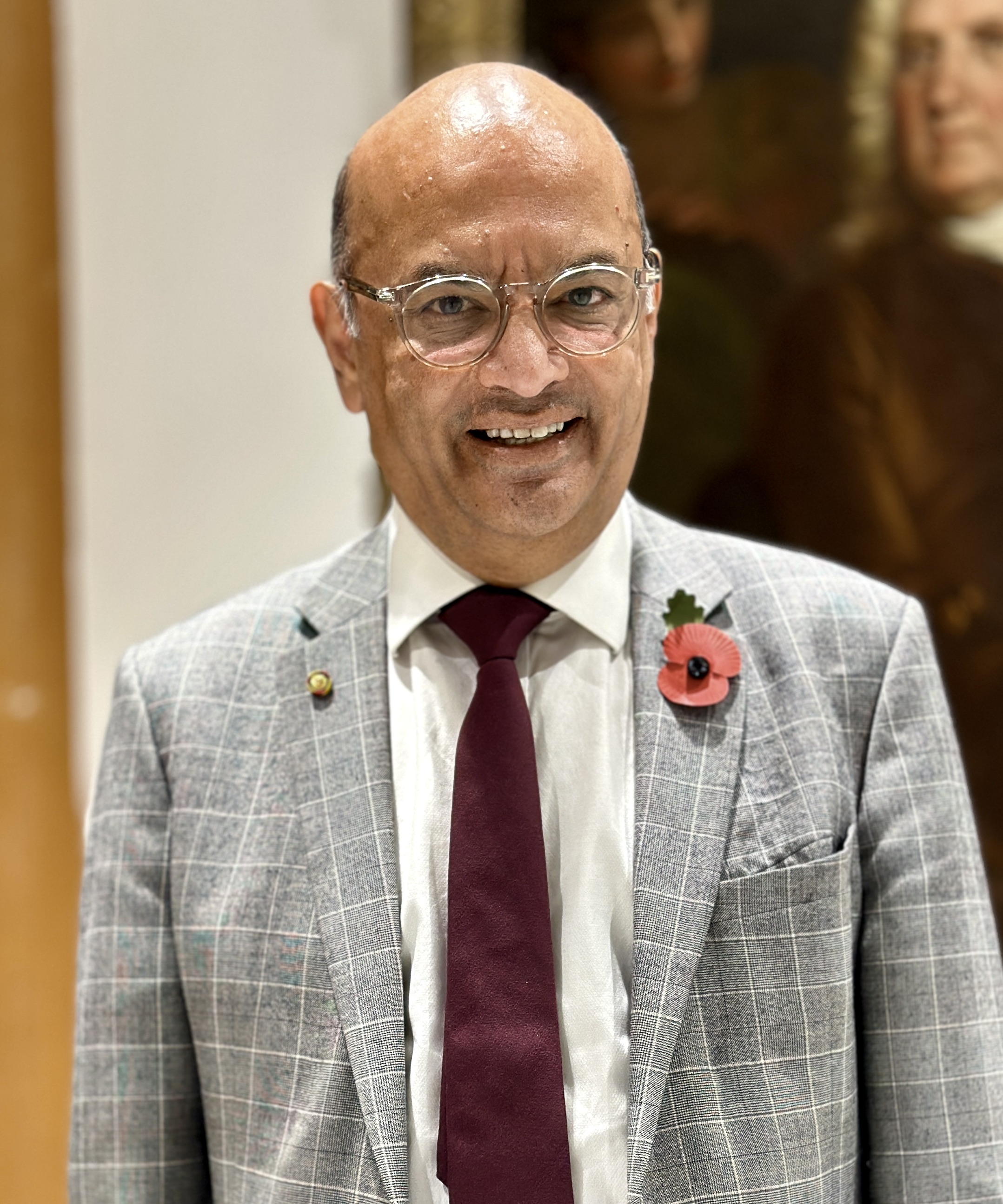
- Mayur Lakhani at the Royal College of Physicians (2023)
- Born: 1960 (age 65–66); Uganda
- Occupation: General practitioner
- Known for: President and chair of the RCGP
- Medical career
- Profession: Medicine

Sir Mayur Keshavji Lakhani CBE FRCP FRCGP (born 20 April 1960) is a British doctor who works as a general practitioner and is Chair of the Faculty of Medical Leadership and Management (FMLM).

Lakhani was Chairman of the Royal College of General Practitioners (RCGP) from 2004 to 2007. He was President of the RCGP 2017 to 2019. He was Chairman of The National Council for Palliative Care 2008–2015.

== Early life ==
Mayur Lakhani was born in 1960 in Uganda, to parents from India. He moved to the UK with his family in 1972 and went to school in Leicester. He studied at the University of Dundee, graduating with a medical degree in 1983. He initially worked in Scotland and Cambridge before returning to Leicester. Since qualifying as a GP in 1991 he has worked at Highgate Medical Centre in Sileby.

== Career ==
Lakhani was appointed Chairman of RCGP in 2004, and remained in the position until 2007 when Steve Field took over. He is a nationally elected member of Council of RCGP.

Lakhani was appointed Chairman of The National Council for Palliative Care in 2008, succeeding Francis Plowden, then stepping down in 2015, once he had reached the maximum limit of seven years in the post.

In 2015, Lakhani stood as a candidate for the position of President of the RCGP. He stood again in 2017 and was elected as president, to take up office in November 2017 for a two-year term.

Lakhani is a senior founding member of the Faculty of Medical Leadership and Management (FMLM), re-elected Chair in 2022. He is an honorary member of the University of Leicester. He is Chairman of West Leicestershire CCG.

== Honours ==
Lakhani was appointed Commander of the Order of the British Empire (CBE) in the 2007 Birthday Honours for services to medicine. He was knighted in the 2023 New Year Honours for services to general practice.
