= Royal Derby Hospital =

Coordinates: 52.9107°N 1.5143°W

- University Hospitals of Derby and Burton NHS Foundation Trust
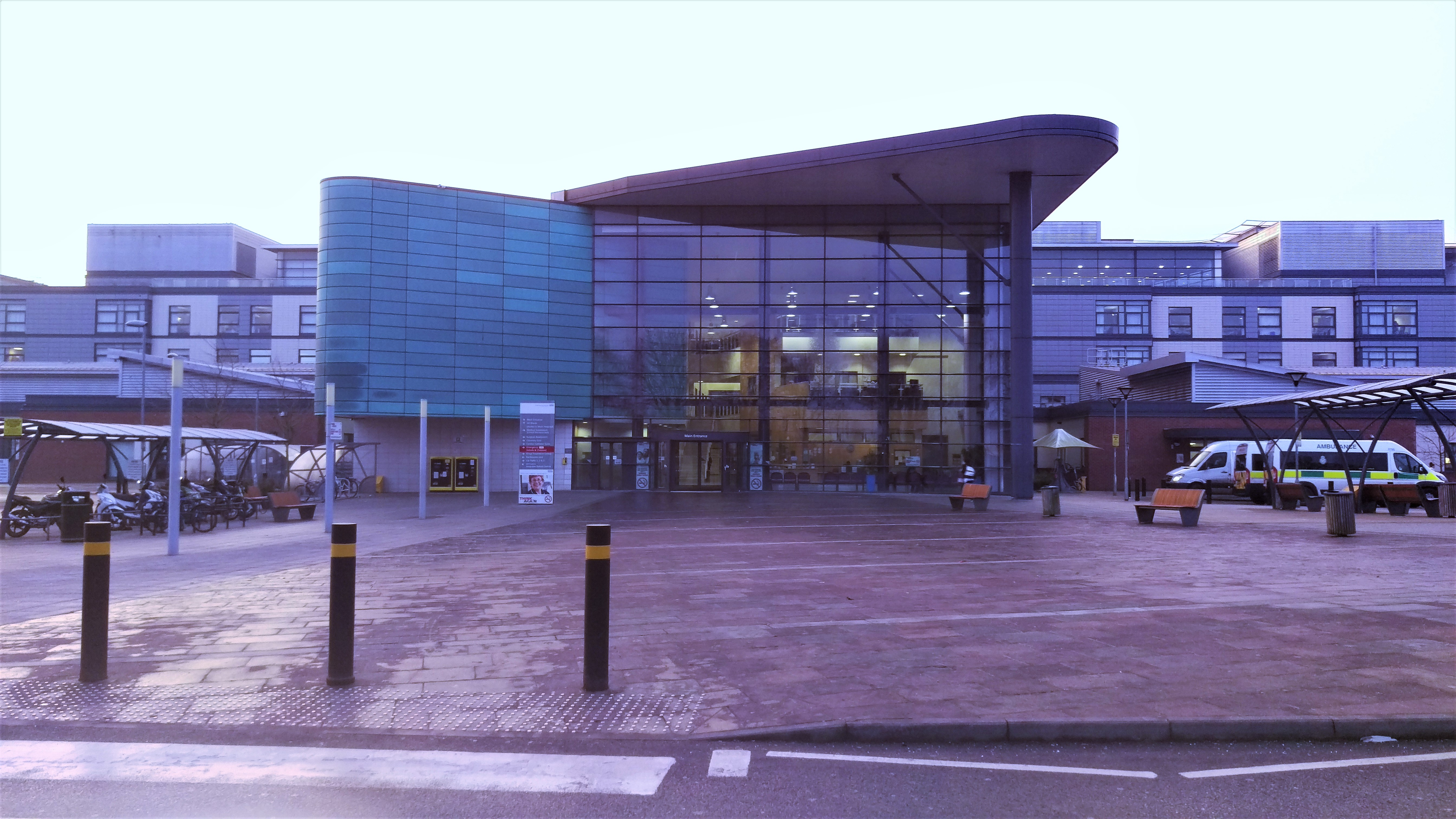
- Royal Derby Hospital Main Entrance

Geography
- Location: Uttoxeter Road, Derby DE22 3NE, England

Organisation
- Care system: NHS
- Type: Teaching, General
- Affiliated university: University of Nottingham medical school

Services
- Emergency department: Yes
- Beds: 1139

History
- Founded: 1927; 99 years ago

Links
- Website: www.uhdb.nhs.uk
- Lists: Hospitals in England

Royal Derby Hospital is one of two teaching hospitals in the city of Derby, England, the other being the Florence Nightingale Community Hospital. It is managed by the University Hospitals of Derby and Burton NHS Foundation Trust.

== History ==
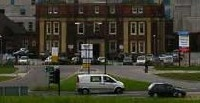
The old Derby City General Hospital in 2005

The original hospital on the site was the Derby City General Hospital, which was built in 1927 and latterly focused on maternity and children's care. The hospital, which had become quite dilapidated, was demolished in September 2006.

A new hospital was procured under a Private Finance Initiative contract to replace both the Derby City General Hospital and the Derbyshire Royal Infirmary in 2003. The new hospital was built by Skanska at a cost of £333 million. It was opened by the Queen and the Duke of Edinburgh in April 2010.

== Facilities ==
The new hospital has 1,159 acute beds and 35 operating theatres. It provides 200 single en-suite rooms and 4-bed bays for patients on its wards. Derbyshire Children's Hospital is co-located on the Royal Derby Hospital site. The hospital is a major teaching centre for the University of Nottingham medical school including the graduate entry medical school (which is based at the Royal Derby Hospital site).

== See also ==
- List of hospitals in England
