= Midlands Partnership University NHS Foundation Trust =

Healthcare provider in England

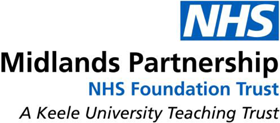
- Headquarters: Trust Headquarters, St. George's Hospital, Stafford
- Region served: Midlands
- Chair: Jacqueline Small
- Chief executive: Neil Carr
- Staff: 8,500
- Website: https://www.mpft.nhs.uk

The Midlands Partnership University NHS Foundation Trust was created in June 2018 in England by a merger of Staffordshire and Stoke-on-Trent Partnership NHS Trust and the South Staffordshire and Shropshire Healthcare NHS Foundation Trust. It provides physical and mental health, learning disabilities and adult social care services.

It forecast an annual turnover of more than £500 million. No more than 40 redundancies among the 8,500 staff were expected because of the merger.

It uses Nasstar's OneConsultation platform for secure online consultations. This was installed across the trust in March 2020 hurriedly because of the COVID-19 pandemic in England. More than 80,000 online consultations had taken place by February 2022.

In September 2025, the trust was ranked second nationally out of 61 non-acute trusts in the first results from NHS England's NHS Oversight Framework.
