= University Hospitals of Derby and Burton NHS Foundation Trust =

NHS hospital trust

The University Hospitals of Derby and Burton NHS Foundation Trust was formed by a merger of Derby Teaching Hospitals NHS Foundation Trust and Burton Hospitals NHS Foundation Trust in July 2018.

University Hospitals of Derby and Burton (UHDB) comprises the Royal Derby Hospital, Queen's Hospital, in Belvedere Road, Burton, Florence Nightingale Community Hospital in Derby, Sir Robert Peel Community Hospital in Tamworth and Samuel Johnson Community Hospital in Lichfield.

In July 2019 the Court of Appeal decided that the trust had breached the 2002 contract for junior doctors because their hours and rest periods had been underestimated by commercial software over some years. The case will affect other NHS employers and substantial arrears will be due.

The trust established a company, D-Hive, in 2016 to run commercial projects to raise money for healthcare services. It made a profit of £2.5 million over 5 years, but lost £361,679 in 2019 when the Derby Sound music festival was cancelled because of poor ticket sales.

In April 2024 the trust granted a 5 year contract to independent sector provider One Health Group to reduce internal waiting lists.
