= Healthcare in Staffordshire =

Healthcare in Staffordshire was the responsibility of six clinical commissioning groups until July 2022, covering Stafford & Surrounds, North Staffordshire, South East Staffordshire and Seisdon Peninsula, East Staffordshire, Cannock Chase, and Stoke-on-Trent.

In 2015, a deficit of more than £200 million was forecast for the county within the next three years.

== History ==
From 1947 to 1974 NHS services in Staffordshire were managed by the Birmingham Regional Hospital Board. In 1974 the boards were abolished and replaced by regional health authorities. Staffordshire still came under the Birmingham RHA. Regions were reorganised in 1996 and Staffordshire came under the West Midlands RHA. From 1974 there was an area health authority covering the county. There were three district health authorities, covering South-East Staffordshire, Mid-Staffordshire and North Staffordshire. In 1993 Mid-Staffordshire was merged into South Staffordshire. Four primary care trusts established in the county in 2002: Newcastle-under-Lyme PCT, Staffordshire Moorlands PCT, Stoke-on-Trent PCT and South Staffordshire PCT. Newcastle-under-Lyme and Staffordshire Moorlands were merged into North Staffordshire PCT in 2006. They were managed by the Shropshire and Staffordshire Strategic Health Authority which was merged into NHS West Midlands in 2006.

Management consultancy KPMG produced a report on the local health economy in March 2015 for the NHS Trust Development Authority, NHS England and Monitor which criticised the lack of collaboration between different organisations in the county. They said the health system was in “perpetual crisis mode” with a lack of clinical leaders and a managerially focused leadership with “many examples of silo working”. They reported that clinical commissioning groups in the county did not collaborate and their plans, including financial contracts, were not aligned with each other or providers.

In 2016 the CCGs of Stafford and Surrounds, Cannock Chase, and South East Staffordshire and Seisdon Peninsula were proposing a virtual merger, in which all operational functions would be combined, leaving only the governing bodies separate.

== Sustainability and transformation plan ==
Staffordshire formed a sustainability and transformation plan area in March 2016 with John MacDonald, the Chair of University Hospitals of North Midlands NHS Trust as its leader Burton Hospital In 2017 it was announced that A&E and Stafford A&E were likely to be downgraded, and the community hospitals at Longton and Cheadle and Haywood Hospital would lose 167 hospital beds. A Care Quality Commission visit to Stoke found that in the city there was no shared vision for services or evidence of whole system strategic planning and commissioning. Many older people had to stay excessively long in hospital before they could be moved into care. It criticised proposals to close community beds without consulting social care leaders about the impact.

Staffordshire and Stoke-on-Trent started using a new integrated care record, One Health and Care, in May 2021. This is based on Graphnet’s CareCentric technology. The records for 1.1 million residents stretch across 147 GP practices, two acute trusts, one combined community and mental health trust, one mental health trust, two councils, and six clinical commissioning groups.

== Commissioning ==
North Staffordshire Clinical Commissioning Group decided that from October 2015 they would no longer pay for hearing aids for people with mild hearing loss or some people with moderate hearing loss. This would save around £200,000 a year. The decision was accepted by Staffordshire County Council's health scrutiny committee in June 2015. It was expected that the other CCGs in the county would adopt a similar policy but the process was suspended in February 2016 after the collapse of a similar contract in Cambridgeshire.

The CCGs in Stoke-on-Trent, North Staffordshire, East Staffordshire, Stafford & Surrounds, Cannock Chase and South East Staffordshire and Seisdon Peninsula agreed to share an accountable officer in August 2017.

The North Staffordshire and Stoke on Trent clinical commissioning groups expected a deficit of £27 million in 2018–19. The CCGs in Cannock Chase, South East Staffordshire and Seisdon Peninsula, and Stafford and Surrounds forecast a combined deficit of £29 million. At the same time the University Hospitals of North Midlands NHS Trust expected a deficit of £40 million, and there were financial disputes between the trust and the CCGs. Both CCGs were rated inadequate by the Care Quality Commission in 2019.

In 2021 the Staffordshire and Stoke-on-Trent ICS provided about 400 Amazon Echos to patients in North Staffordshire to improve their self-managed health and wellbeing. The health benefits were said to be remarkable, especially in terms of medication adherence and mental health.

== Primary care ==
Out-of-hours services are provided by Staffordshire Doctors Urgent Care, which is part of Vocare. Three quarters of the general practitioners in Stoke on Trent were found to refuse to take on homeless people as patients in both 2016 and 2018.

The Sustainability and Transformation Partnership place Amazon Alexa in the homes of 50 patients in 2019 as a trial. They reported being better able to manage their health conditions and lead more independent lives.

== Acute services ==
Hospital provision in the North of the county is by the University Hospitals of North Midlands NHS Trust which also runs facilities in Stafford. University Hospitals of Derby and Burton NHS Foundation Trust is in the South-East of the county, and the South West is served by hospitals in Wolverhampton and Walsall.

The four CCGs covering Stafford and Surrounds, Cannock Chase, Stoke-on-Trent and North Staffordshire set up a ten-year contract for cancer services in 2015 with Interserve Investments, University Hospitals of North Midlands NHS Trust and Royal Wolverhampton Hospitals NHS Trust. It was intended that the £690 million contract would provide a 10% increase in cancer patients being treated without any extra money. The North Midlands Trust withdrew in July 2015 because it expected that costs, particularly for drugs, would rise at a rate above inflation. The arrangement was criticised as an attempt to privatise the NHS. In June 2015 more than 63,000 people signed a petition against it and presented it to a CCG meeting.

== Mental health ==
North Staffordshire Combined Healthcare NHS Trust provides mental health services across Stoke-on-Trent and North Staffordshire. Mental health services in the South of the county are provided by Midlands Partnership NHS Foundation Trust. Children's autism services were provided by South Staffordshire and Shropshire Healthcare NHS Foundation Trust and Midlands Psychology, a social enterprise from 2010 until 2019 when it was moved to Midlands Partnership NHS Foundation Trust after several poor reviews and a report from Healthwatch Staffordshire which said that parents' complaints had been ignored. The clinical commissioning group were said to have provided minimal monitoring and intervention.

== Community services ==
Midlands Partnership NHS Foundation Trust provides both health and social care community services.

North Staffordshire Clinical Commissioning Group was the first in the country to restrict access to NHS-funded hearing aids. From September 2015 it will no longer routinely fund hearing aids for patients with hearing loss between 26 and 40 decibels. People with “moderate” hearing loss between 41 and 55 decibels will be eligible for an NHS funded hearing aid if they score sufficiently highly in a “functional impact assessment”.

Virgin Healthcare won a 7-year prime contractor contract worth £270 million for providing long-term and elderly care for about 38,000 people with long-term health conditions in East Staffordshire in March 2015. Burton Hospitals NHS Foundation Trust, which is sub-contracted to Virgin, had to pay £300,000 in VAT at the end of 2016-17 because Virgin cannot recover VAT costs as NHS organisations can. In October 2018, after a prolonged dispute with the CCG, Virgin terminated all the elements of the contract for which it did not itself directly deliver services. The CCG said "From May/June 2019 East Staffordshire CCG will enter into contracts for the services terminated by Virgin Care directly with the providers of those services instead of requiring Virgin Care to negotiate sub-contracts for them.” In April 2019 Virgin gave a 12-month termination notice on the remaining contract because it would have had to subsidise the service by more than £1 million a year.

== Healthwatch ==
There are two Healthwatch organisations. One in Stoke-on-Trent and one covering the rest of the county. Staffordshire Healthwatch launched a complaints service in February 2015 because its research suggested thousands of people are not lodging complaints when they experience problems in hospitals or GPs surgeries.

== See also ==
- Category:Health in Staffordshire
- Healthcare in the United Kingdom
