= Florence Nightingale Community Hospital =

- University Hospitals of Derby and Burton NHS Foundation Trust
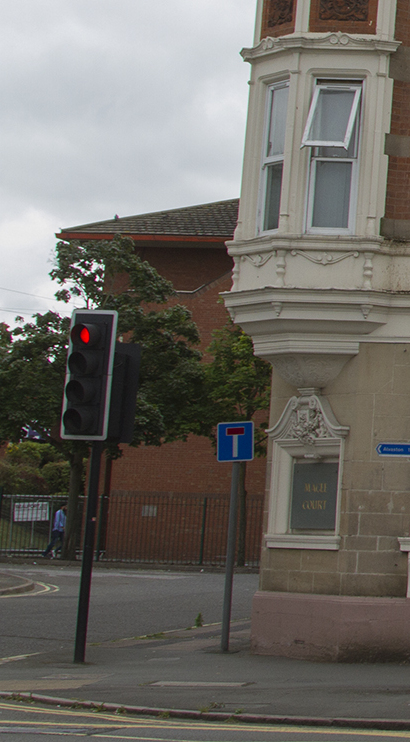
- Regent Street Derby with the London Road Community Hospital just visible at the end of the street

- Shown in Derbyshire

Geography
- Location: Derby, England
- Coordinates: 52.914°N 1.469°W

Organisation
- Care system: NHS

Services
- Emergency department: No

History
- Founded: 2009

Links
- Website: www.uhdb.nhs.uk
- Lists: Hospitals in England

The Florence Nightingale Community Hospital, formerly the London Road Community Hospital, is a community hospital on London Road in Derby, England. It was established in 2009. It is managed by the University Hospitals of Derby and Burton NHS Foundation Trust. The other main hospital in Derby is the Royal Derby Hospital.

== History ==
The hospital was established to provide local community services in central Derby following the closure of Derbyshire Royal Infirmary in 2009. It is located further south-east along the London Road from the former infirmary site. Improvement works were carried out to consolidate services on the new site in 2011. It was renamed from the London Road Community Hospital to the Florence Nightingale Community Hospital in July 2021.

== Services ==
The facility is a modern facility which provides community services including rehabilitation and intermediate care, inpatient facilities and some outpatient services.
