= Queen's Hospital, Burton upon Trent =

Queen's Hospital
- University Hospitals of Derby and Burton NHS Foundation Trust
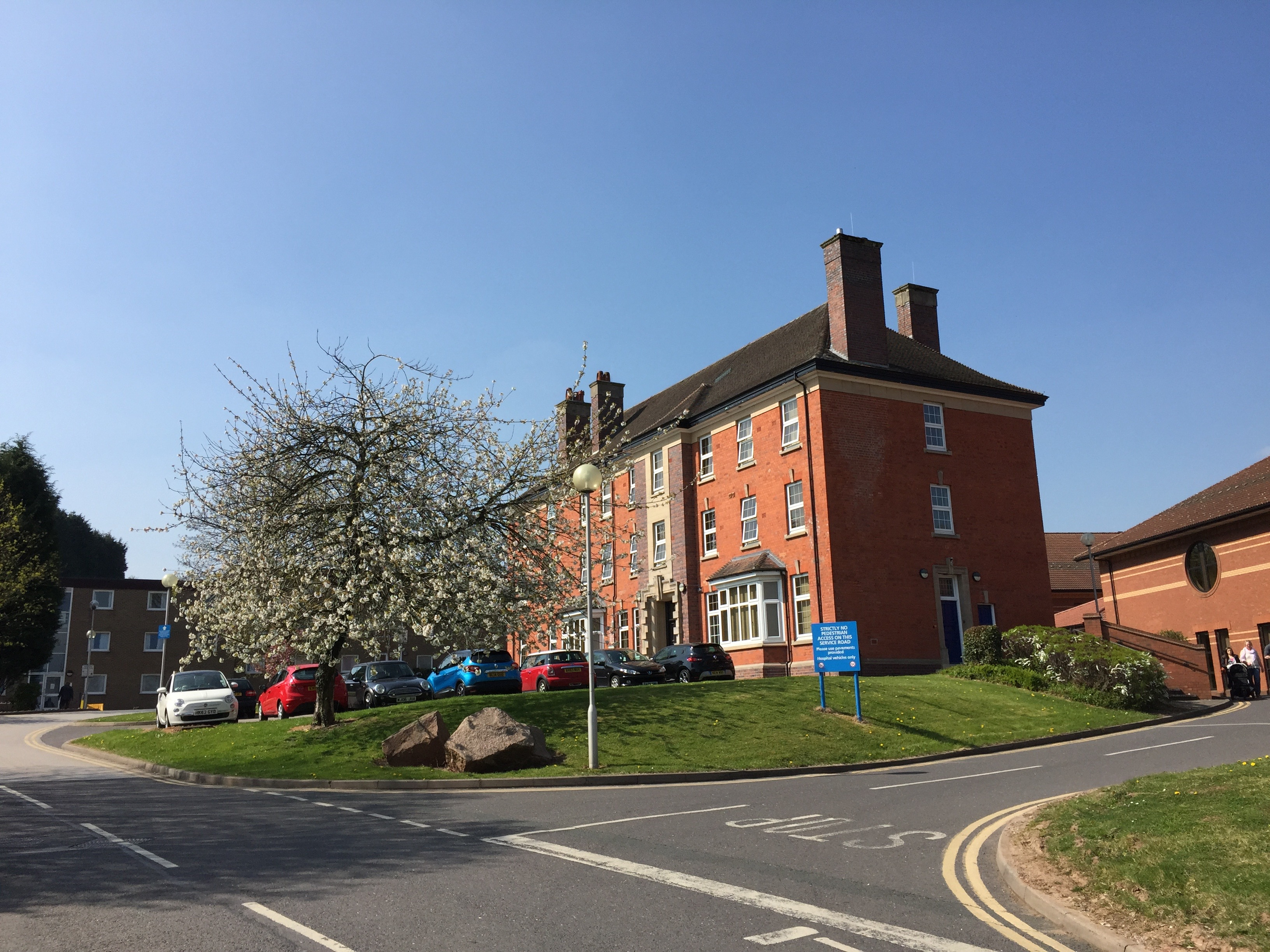
- Tom Davies House at Queen's Hospital

- Shown in Staffordshire

Geography
- Location: Belvedere Road, Burton upon Trent, Staffordshire, England
- Coordinates: 52.8177°N 1.6560°W

Organisation
- Care system: National Health Service
- Type: General

History
- Founded: 1884

Links
- Lists: Hospitals in England

Queen's Hospital is a health facility on Belvedere Road in Burton upon Trent, Staffordshire. It is managed by University Hospitals of Derby and Burton NHS Foundation Trust.

== History ==
The facility has its origins in the Belvedere Union Workhouse which was designed by J. H. Morton and completed in 1884. An infirmary was subsequently built on the west of the site. It became the Burton Public Assistance Institution in 1930 and then joined the National Health Service as Burton District Hospital in 1948. A redevelopment programme intended to consolidate all the town's medical facilities, including those previously delivered at the old Burton Infirmary in Duke Street, on the Belvedere Road site began in the 1970s. The first phase was completed in 1972 and the second phase was completed in 1993. The new facilities were opened by the Queen in December 1995 and, in recognition of this, the facility was renamed Queen's Hospital in 1996.
