= Royal Stoke University Hospital =

Hospital in Staffordshire, England

- University Hospitals of North Midlands NHS Trust
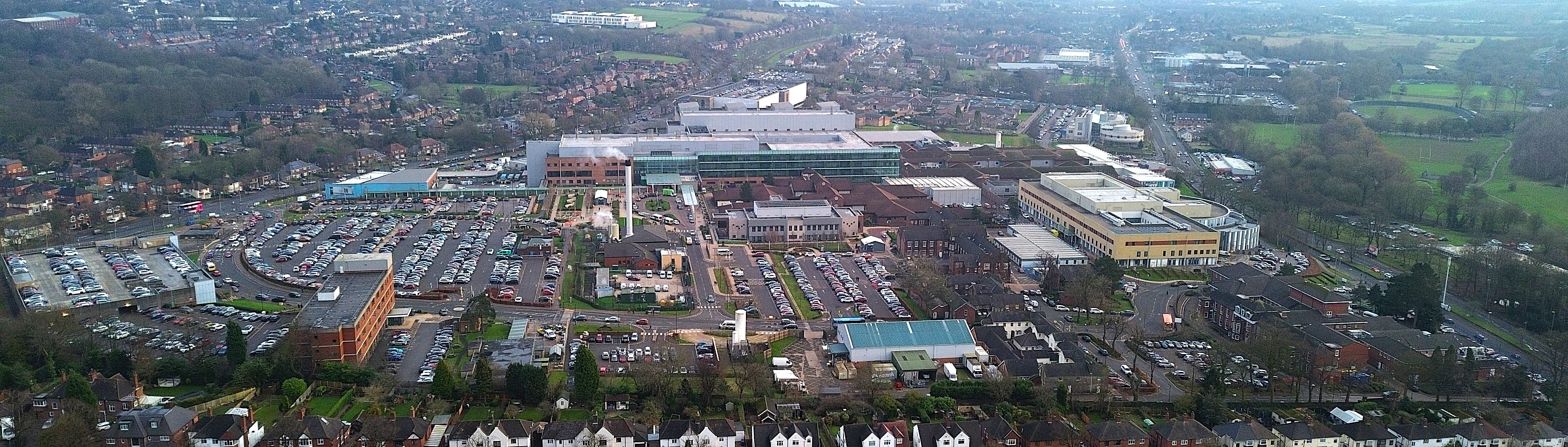
- University Hospital of North Staffordshire

- Location within Staffordshire

Geography
- Location: Stoke-on-Trent, Staffordshire, England, United Kingdom
- Coordinates: 53.0039°N 2.2145°W

Organisation
- Care system: Public NHS
- Type: Teaching
- Affiliated university: Keele University School of Medicine

Services
- Emergency department: Major Trauma Centre
- Beds: 1,328

Links
- Website: http://www.uhnm.nhs.uk
- Lists: Hospitals in England

Royal Stoke University Hospital (formerly the University Hospital of North Staffordshire) is a teaching and research hospital at Hartshill in the English county of Staffordshire. It lies in the city of Stoke-on-Trent, near the border with Newcastle-under-Lyme, and is run by the University Hospitals of North Midlands NHS Trust.

== History ==
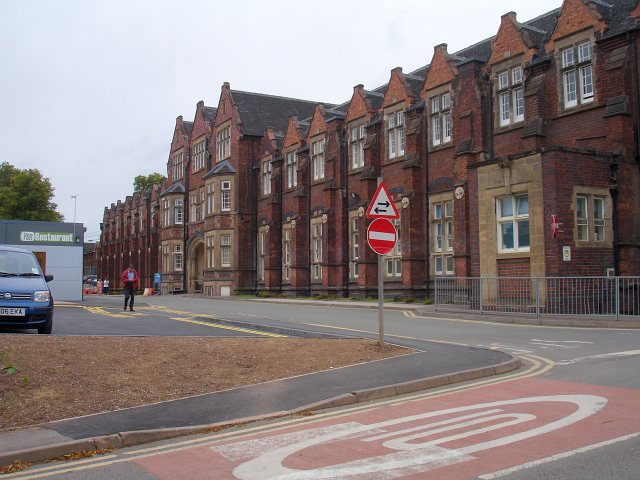
Part of the old City General Hospital

The first hospital on the site, known as the Parish Hospital, was completed in 1842. This facility evolved to become the London Road Hospital and Institution by the early 20th century and became the City General Hospital in 1945. It joined the National Health Service in 1948.

New facilities were procured under a private finance initiative contract to replace both the City General Hospital and the North Staffordshire Royal Infirmary in 2007. The works, which were designed by Ryder / HKS and carried out by Laing O'Rourke at a cost of £370 million on the old City General Hospital site, were completed August 2012.

== Keele University School of Medicine ==
It is the main teaching hospital for the Keele University School of Medicine. The clinical undergraduate medical school and postgraduate medical school buildings are in the grounds of the hospital, as well as the Clinical Education Centre and the Keele University Health Library which is the main teaching facility for the School of Nursing and Midwifery.

== Staffordshire Children's Hospital ==
In March 2020 the Staffordshire Children's Hospital was launched as a "hospital within a hospital". Paediatric patients have access to specialist clinical teams, who care for children with complex conditions or medical problems.

== See also ==
- Healthcare in Staffordshire
- List of hospitals in England
