= Hartshill, Staffordshire =

Area of Stoke-on-Trent, England

Coordinates: 53.0084°N 2.2007°W

Hartshill
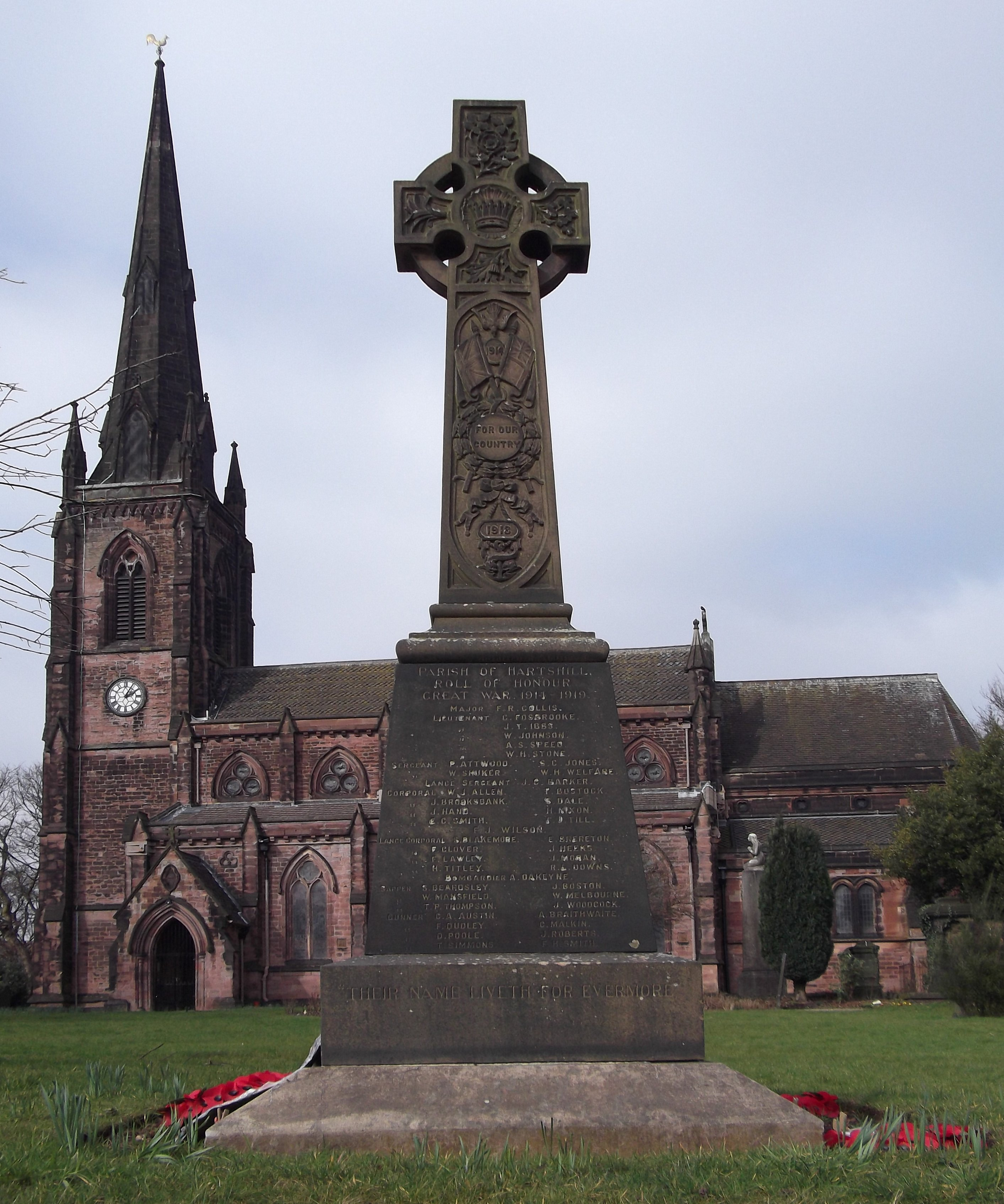
- Hartshill War Memorial and Church

- Location within Staffordshire
- OS grid reference: SJ866456
- Unitary authority: Stoke-on-Trent
- Ceremonial county: Staffordshire
- Region: West Midlands
- Country: England
- Sovereign state: United Kingdom
- Post town: STOKE-ON-TRENT
- Postcode district: ST4
- Dialling code: 01782
- Police: Staffordshire
- Fire: Staffordshire
- Ambulance: West Midlands
- UK Parliament: Stoke-on-Trent Central

Hartshill is a suburb and historic township of Stoke-on-Trent in Staffordshire, England.

== History ==
Originally a Norman deer hunting park, which survived as such well into the 15th century. This later became a landed estate and farm. The valley side section of the park survived into the 20th century as a large area of woods and grassland - which is now reclaimed and run as a local nature reserve under the name of Hartshill Park.

The modern residential sections of Hartshill were developed by Herbert Minton (1793–1858) to serve as a dormitory suburb of Stoke town, and there are numerous fine listed buildings in the area which were commissioned by Minton and his sons. The southern end of Hartshill Park was home to a Catholic convent.

The ecclesiastical parish was created out of the parish of Stoke in 1842, when Holy Trinity church was built by George Gilbert Scott under the patronage of Herbert Minton. The apsidal ended chancel was completed at a later date, circa 1870.

== Modern Hartshill ==
Dominant in Hartshill is the Royal Stoke University Hospital, which was formed out of the City General Hospital, the North Staffordshire Royal Infirmary, the North Staffordshire Orthopedic Hospital and large central Accident and Emergency, Outpatients and Pathology Departments. Keele University's School of Medicine and School of Nursing and Midwifery operate the clinical part of their courses from a separate campus at the hospital. In 2012, the hospital received a £400 million refurbishment and upgrade. The areas air ambulance operates from the hospital.

== Notable people ==
- J.R.R. Tolkien regularly visited North Staffordshire during his long academic holidays, until his death in 1973. During these holidays he stayed with his son at the Presbytery in Hartshill Road.
