= Royal Wolverhampton NHS Trust =

UK NHS trust

The Royal Wolverhampton NHS Trust
- Type: NHS trust
- Headquarters: Wolverhampton Road; Heath Town; Wolverhampton; WV10 0QP
- Hospitals: Cannock Chase Hospital; New Cross Hospital
- Chair: Steve Field
- Chief executive: Joe Chadwick-Bell
- Staff: 8,203
- Website: www.royalwolverhampton.nhs.uk

The Royal Wolverhampton NHS Trust (formerly Royal Wolverhampton Hospitals NHS Trust) runs New Cross Hospital and West Park Rehabilitation Hospital in Wolverhampton and Cannock Chase Hospital in Cannock.

In December 2020 it agreed to appoint a joint chair with Walsall Healthcare NHS Trust, anticipating plans to form a group model across the sustainability and transformation partnership.

== Facilities ==
The New Cross Hospital Trust was established in 1994, covered Wolverhampton, the Black Country, South Staffordshire, North Worcestershire and Shropshire.

The trust owns the former eye hospital building in Wolverhampton, which is now derelict. In December 2013 it was announced that the trust would be unable to achieve foundation status for at least six months after a Care Quality Commission inspection raised concerns about staffing levels. In March 2015 it abandoned plans to become a foundation trust.

In October 2014 it was announced that the trust would take over Cannock Chase Hospital formerly run by Mid Staffordshire NHS Foundation Trust.

In February 2019 Dr Steve Field was appointed chair of the trust.

In March 2020, Cannock Chase Hospital was forced to temporarily close down to assist Wolverhampton New Cross Hospital staff with the care of seriously ill patients.

== Primary care ==
It took over three GP practices in Wolverhampton in April 2016 as a pilot scheme for vertically integrated care. The 12 GPs became employees of the trust. The practices - Alfred Squire Road Health Centre and Lea Road Medical Practice in Wolverhampton and the MGS Medical Practice in Bilston - have 23,000 registered patients. In June 2017 it took over more practices bringing the total to 12 with 70,000 registered patients and 37 GP partners employed by the trust. In May 2022 it proposed merging the eight GMS contracts it had with its GP practices into one.

It announced a partnership with Babylon Health in January 2020 to develop "digital-first integrated care". The trust itself runs 10 GP practices. In April 2020 it made a deal with the company for citywide coverage of its new COVID-19 care assistant app, which will be available to 300,000 patients registered to Wolverhampton GPs, and all the trust staff. It agreed a new five-year deal with Babylon in August 2021 to use Babylon 360 to support patients at the trust's nine GP practices.

== Performance ==
The trust was highlighted by NHS England as having 3 of 148 reported never events in the period from April to September 2013.

Mrs Sandra Haynes-Kirkbright was suspended by the trust in July 2012 following allegations made against her by colleagues of bullying, harassment, persistent swearing and unprofessional behaviour. She alleged that the trust cheated in concealing high mortality rates. Her whistle blowing allegations and subsequent treatment have been the subject of investigation by the NHS Trust Development Authority. She was suspended on full pay. In May 2016 an independent review by Lucy Scott-Moncrieff into her case, ordered by Jeremy Hunt, condemned the trust for what it described as "significantly flawed" and "unfair" treatment of her.

The trust was in dispute about £4 million funding for nurses with the Wolverhampton Clinical commissioning group which was subject to arbitration. The arbitration hearing sided in favour of the trust leaving it with £2 million to pay for seven-day working and supervisory ward nurses, and in favour of the CCG for 135 nurses employed to improve staffing on the wards, meaning £2 million was withdrawn. The trust decided in November 2017 that it would reduce the number of full-time equivalent band five registered nurses by 23.58 to a total of 507.85 and increase the number of band four care staff roles from 6 to 30.52 to reflect the addition of 24 nursing associate roles. This decision was criticised by the chief executive of the Royal College of Nursing as substitution of nurses and a risk to patients.

In December 2020, the trust reported that, due to the COVID-19 pandemic, the number of patients presenting to A&E departments during 2020 was substantially lower than in 2019.

In May 2021, the chief executive of the trust described an unexplained increase in the number of A&E attendances to "absolutely unprecendented levels" throughout the trust.

== See also ==
- List of NHS trusts
- Healthcare in West Midlands
