= List of medical schools in the United Kingdom =

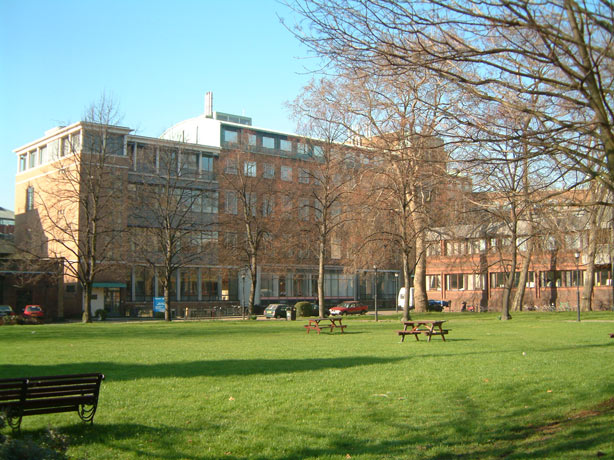
Charterhouse Square, home to Barts and The London School of Medicine and Dentistry, part of Queen Mary, University of London. Medical training has taken place at Barts continuously since its foundation in 1123. Its college of medicine was formally founded in 1843. Prior to this date, however, it was already referred to as a "medical school".

There are forty-six medical schools in the United Kingdom where students can study for a medical degree. There are thirty-six medical schools in England, five in Scotland, three in Wales and two in Northern Ireland.

All but Warwick Medical School, Swansea Medical School and Ulster University offer undergraduate courses in medicine. The Bute Medical School (University of St Andrews) only offers an undergraduate pre-clinical course, with students proceeding to another medical school for clinical studies. Cambridge University offers both pre-clinical and clinical courses in medicine, students who study pre-clinical medicine at this university may move to another university for clinical studies. At other universities students stay at the same university for both pre-clinical and clinical work.

== History of medical training ==
The first medical school in the United Kingdom was established at the University of Edinburgh in 1726. Medical education prior to this was based on apprenticeships and learning from observation. Professors of medicine did very little if any training of students. Few students graduated as physicians during this earlier period.

The earliest example of this earlier style of medical training in Britain was in 1123 at St Bartholomew's Hospital, now part of Queen Mary, University of London. The first Chair of Medicine at a British university was established at the University of Aberdeen in 1497, although this was only filled intermittently and there were calls "for the establishment of a medical school" in 1787. Medical teaching has taken place erratically at the University of Oxford since the early 16th century, and its first Regius Professor of Physic was appointed in 1546. Teaching was reformed in 1833 and again in 1856, but the current medical school was not founded until 1936. The University of St Andrews established a Chair of Medicine in 1772, but did not have a medical school (at Dundee) until 1897. The Linacre Readership in Medicine at the University of Cambridge was founded in 1524, and the Regius Professor of Physic was established in 1540. Teaching was reformed in 1829, but the current medical school was established in 1976. Teaching of apprentices was first recorded in 1561 at St Thomas's Hospital, London, and formalised between 1693 and 1709.

Surgery was seen as a separate profession, initially learned by barber-surgeons through apprenticeship and regulated by its guild, and later by examination by the Royal Colleges of Surgery in England, Edinburgh, Glasgow, and Ireland.

The University of Edinburgh Medical School was founded in 1726 and was the first formally established medical school in the UK. This was followed by Glasgow in 1744, although the school was without a teaching hospital until 1794. The oldest medical school in England is St George's, University of London, which began formal teaching in 1751. In 1768 teaching at St Thomas's and Guy's hospitals in London was formalised with the foundation of the United Hospitals Medical School, which lasted until the foundation of a separate medical school at Guy's in 1825 (now both part of King's College London). The London Hospital Medical College (LHMC) was founded in 1785 and is now part of Queen Mary, University of London's School of Medicine. In the first half of the 19th century, the newly founded university colleges in London opened teaching hospitals in 1834 (University College Hospital) and 1839 (King's College Hospital). The Middlesex Hospital Medical School (now part of UCL) was also founded in this period, in 1835. The London School of Medicine for Women was founded in 1874, the first medical school in Britain to teach women (now part of UCL).

Outside of London and the universities, medical teaching began in Manchester in 1752 and lectures in Birmingham in 1767. Medical schools in Manchester (1824), Birmingham (1825), Sheffield (1829), Leeds (1831), Bristol (1833), Newcastle (1834), Liverpool (1834), and Belfast (1835) were formally established in the first half of the 19th century. Durham University introduced teaching by a Reader in Medicine from its opening in 1833, but had no medical school until the affiliation of the College of Medicine in Newcastle in 1854. In the later 19th century a medical school was established at Cardiff in 1893.

The Medical Act 1858 was a key development in the professionalising of medical practice and training, introducing the General Medical Council and the Medical Register.

=== 20th and 21st centuries ===
The next expansion of medical schools began following the recommendations of the Royal Commission on Medical Education (1965–1968) (the "Todd Report"), which called for the immediate establishment of new schools in Southampton, Leicester and Nottingham to aid medical education in the United Kingdom; all were built between 1970 and 1980. Medical schools at Warwick (located in Coventry), Swansea, Keele (located in Stoke-on-Trent) and Hull (in partnership with York) eventually opened in the 1990s and early 21st century, as well as new medical schools at University of East Anglia (located in Norwich) Durham, Brighton and Sussex, and Plymouth and Exeter.

Buckingham University, the oldest private university in England, opened University of Buckingham Medical School, a graduate entry medical school in 2015. University of Central Lancashire (UCLan) School of Medicine opened to medical students in 2015.

In 2018 Health Secretary Jeremy Hunt announced the creation of five new medical schools in Sunderland, Chelmsford, Canterbury, Lincoln and Lancashire.

Three medical schools were established in the 2020s, although UK government policy limited the number of places funded for UK students:

- Brunel Medical School at Brunel University London opened in 2021, admitting overseas students only.
- Three Counties Medical School at the University of Worcester opened in April 2024.
- Chester Medical School at the University of Chester started to offer a postgraduate MB ChB degree course in 2024.

=== Historical medical schools ===
(Please note that in the tables below and noting the complexities described above in deciding what date some level of teaching became what we now recognise as a medical school, the establishment date generally reflects the formal commencement of the current medical school.)

== England ==
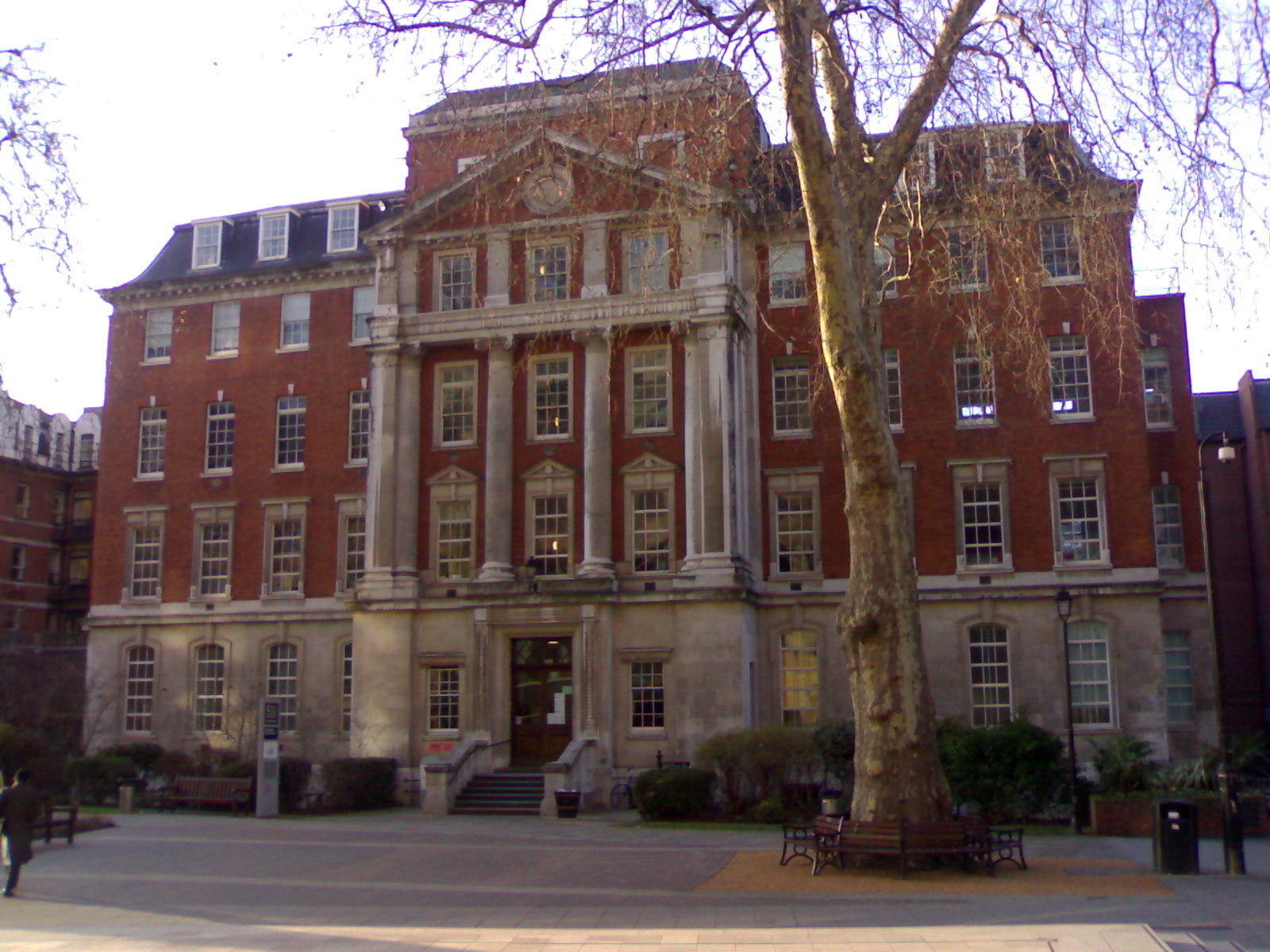
Shepherd's House, King's College London GKT School of Medical Education at Guy's Campus in London

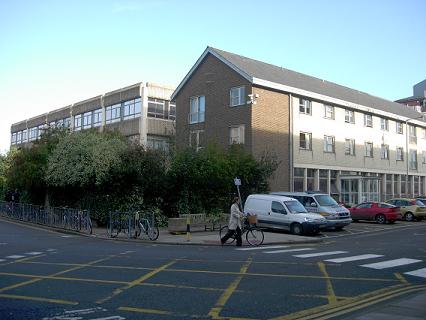
The School of Clinical Medicine at the University of Cambridge

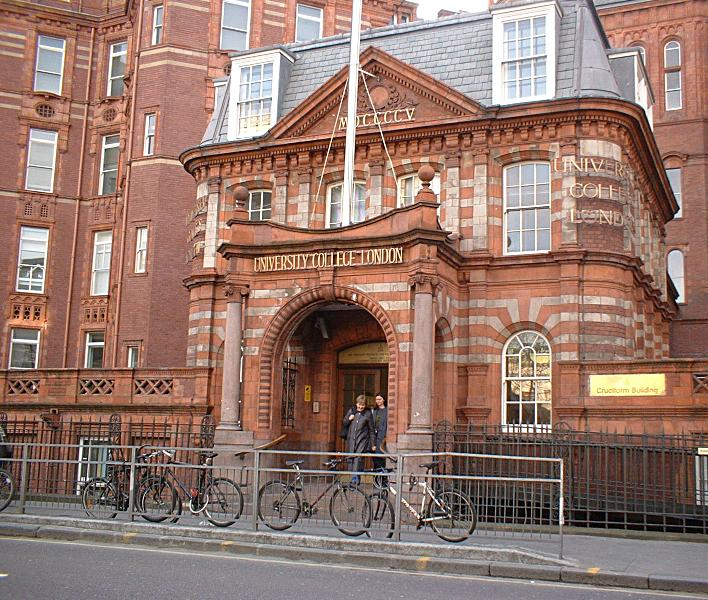
The University College Hospital Cruciform building, used by the UCL Medical School

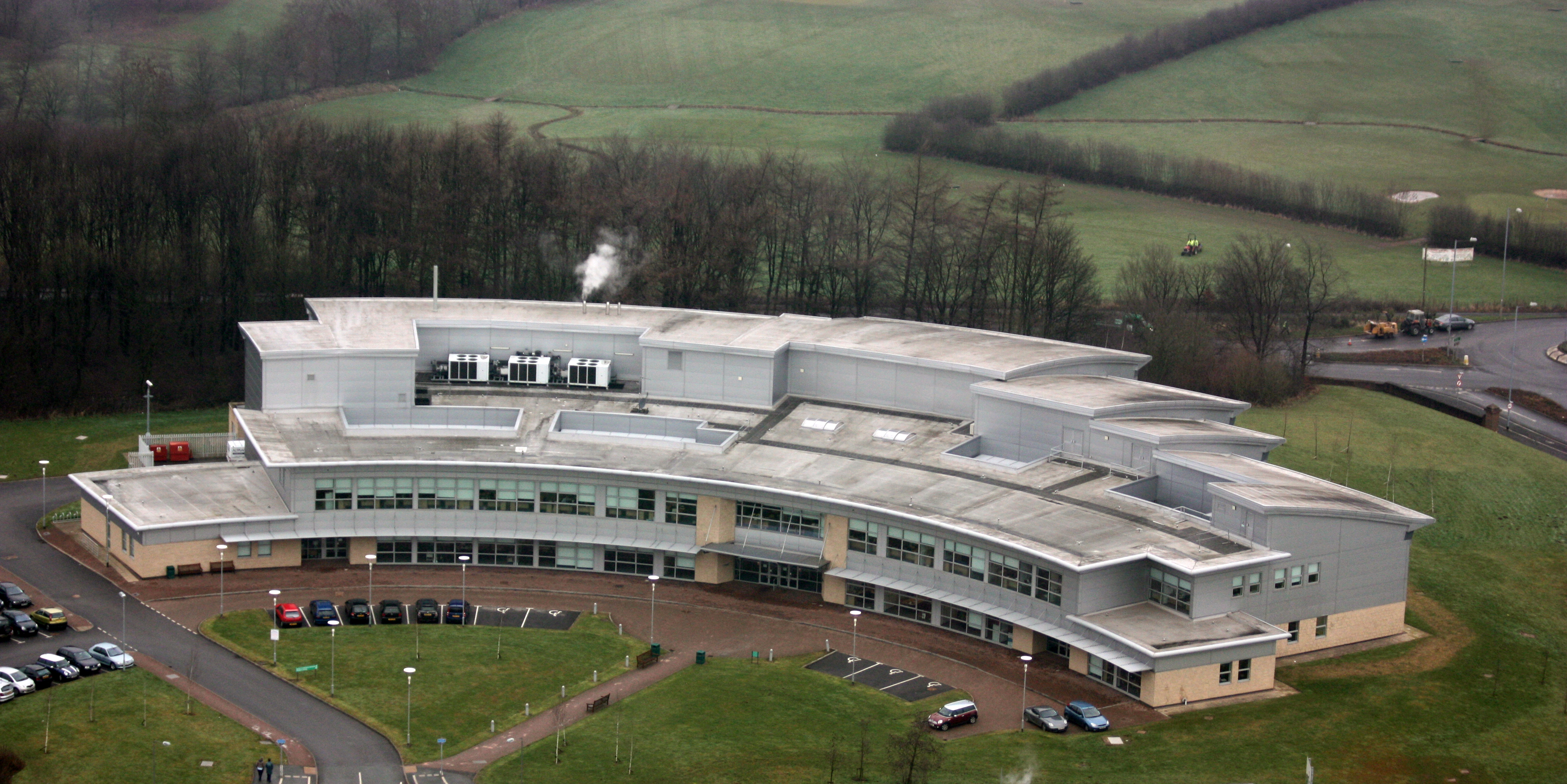
The Keele University Medical School

Name	University	Established	Notes	Degree awarded	Ref.
Aston Medical School	Aston	2015		MBChB	
Anglia Ruskin School of Medicine	Anglia Ruskin	2018	First intake of students took place in the academic year of 2018/9, with a cohort of 100 students per annum.	MBChB	
St Mary's School of Medicine	St Mary's	2026	First intake of students expected in 2026/27.	MBBS	
Hertfordshire Medical School	Hertfordshire	2026	First intake of students expected in 2026/27.	MBBS	
University of Greater Manchester Medical School	University of Greater Manchester	2025	First intake of students expected in 2025/26.	MBChB	
Barts and The London School of Medicine and Dentistry	Queen Mary (University of London)	1785	Current school formed by the merger of the Medical College of St Bartholomew's Hospital and the London Hospital Medical College which was founded in 1785. Teaching at St Barts dates from 1123.	MBBS	
University of Birmingham Medical School	Birmingham	1825	Formal medical education began at Birmingham in 1825 Merged with Mason Science College in 1900.	MBChB	
Bristol Medical School	Bristol	1833	Merged with the University College, Bristol (now University of Bristol) in 1893.	MBChB	
Brighton and Sussex Medical School	Brighton; Sussex	2002	Affiliated with both the University of Brighton and the University of Sussex.	BMBS	
Brunel Medical School	Brunel	2021	Open to UK and International students (eligible for entry since 2022 and 2024 respectively)	MBBS	
University of Buckingham Medical School	Buckingham	2015	4.5 year course, first cohort graduated in June 2019. January start date. Associated hospitals are: Milton Keynes University Hospital; Warwick Hospital (South Warwickshire NHS Foundation Trust) and Stoke Mandeville Hospital (Buckinghamshire Healthcare NHS Trust); St Andrews Hospital Northampton.	MBChB	
School of Clinical Medicine, University of Cambridge	Cambridge	1976	Teaching of medicine began in 1540, but lay dormant for many years. An abortive attempt to put medicine on a proper footing was undertaken in the 1840s, but eventually petered out by the 1860s. It was not until 1976 in response to the recommendation of the Royal Commission on Medical Education that a complete medical course was re-established at Cambridge through partnership with Addenbrooke's Hospital in Cambridge.	MB BChir	
University of Lancashire, School of Medicine and Dentistry	Preston	2015	The school works in very close partnership with NHS Trusts and CCGs in both Lancashire and Cumbria.Recruiting international students from 2015, sponsored UK students from 2017 and UK government funded students from 2018 onwards.	MBBS	
Edge Hill University Faculty of Health, Social Care & Medicine	Edge Hill	2019		MBChB	
University of Exeter Medical School	Exeter	2013 (Peninsula College: 2000)	Established after the split of the Peninsula College of Medicine and Dentistry.	BMBS	
Hull York Medical School	Hull; York	2003	Affiliated with both the University of Hull and the University of York.	MBBS	
Imperial College School of Medicine	Imperial College London	1997 (Charing Cross Hospital: 1818)	Formed by the merger of St Mary's Hospital Medical School, the National Heart and Lung Institute, the Royal Postgraduate Medical School and the Charing Cross and Westminster Medical School.	MBBS	
Keele University School of Medicine	Keele	2003	Founded as the Department of Postgraduate Medicine in 1978; began teaching undergraduate clinical medicine in 2003 using the Manchester curriculum. As such, the MBChB degree was awarded by the University of Manchester until 2011. From 2012 (2007 intake) the MBChB degree was awarded by Keele University itself.	MBChB (see comments)	
Kent and Medway Medical School	University of Kent & Canterbury Christchurch	2020	The medical school has been formed as a collaboration between the University of Kent and Canterbury Christchurch University. The first cohort will consist of 150 students and is being supervised by Brighton and Sussex Medical School.	BMBS	
King's College London GKT School of Medical Education	King's College London (University of London)	1988 (St Thomas's Hospital: 1550)	Result of a merger between King's College London and United Medical and Dental Schools of Guy's and St Thomas' Hospitals in 1998. Known as GKT School of Medicine until 2005. Teaching began in 1550 at St Thomas's Hospital Medical School.	MBBS	
Lancaster Medical School	Lancaster	2006	Education undertaken by the Cumbria and Lancashire Medical and Dental Consortium. The MBChB degree was awarded by the University of Liverpool. The General Medical Council approved Lancaster in 2012 to deliver their own medical degree independently. Students starting after September 2013, will graduate with a Lancaster degree.	MBChB	
Leeds School of Medicine	Leeds	1831		MBChB	
Leicester Medical School	Leicester	1975		MBChB	
Lincoln Medical School	Lincoln	2018	First students commenced in 2019.	BMBS	
Liverpool Medical School	Liverpool	1834		MBChB	
Manchester Medical School	Manchester	1824	Medical teaching began in 1752 when Charles White founded the first modern hospital in the Manchester area, the Manchester Royal Infirmary. The medical school was first constituted in 1824.	MBChB	
Newcastle University Medical School	Newcastle	1834	Durham University College of Medicine 1851–1937, Medical School of King's College, University of Durham 1937–1963. Absorbed Durham University School of Medicine, Pharmacy and Health (est. 2001) in 2017.	MBBS	
University of Nottingham Medical School	Nottingham	1970	Has an associated graduate school, the University of Nottingham Medical School at Derby.	BMBS	
Norwich Medical School	East Anglia	2000	Medical school of the University of East Anglia	MBBS	
Oxford University Medical School	Oxford	1946	Medicine has been taught at the University of Oxford sporadically since the 13th century but lay dormant through the 19th century. The current medical school, teaching both clinical and undergraduate students, was established in 1946.	BM BCh	
Peninsula Medical School	Plymouth	2013 (Peninsula College: 2000)	Established after the split of the Peninsula College of Medicine and Dentistry.	BMBS	
UCL Medical School	University College London (University of London)	1998 (Middlesex Hospital: 1746)	A merger in 1987 between the medical schools of Middlesex Hospital (1746) and University College Hospital (1834), and a subsequent merger in 1998 with the Royal Free Hospital School of Medicine (founded as the London School of Medicine for Women in 1874) formed the present school.	MB BS	
Sheffield Medical School	Sheffield	1828	Affiliated with the Royal Hallamshire Hospital.	MBChB	
Southampton Medical School	Southampton	1971	Students intercalate a Bachelor of Medical Sciences (BMedSci) degree within the 5 years of their course. An optional year-long Masters of Medical Science (MMedSci) intercalated degree is also on offer for students.	BMBS, BMedSci (see comments)	
University of Sunderland School of Medicine	University of Sunderland	2019	A new medical school that utilises state-of-the-art clinical simulation. The first cohort of students started in September 2019.	MBChB	
University of Surrey School of Medicine	University of Surrey	2024	A new medical school offering a patient-centred, digitally-enabled and interprofessional 4-year programme for graduates.	BMBS	
City St George's, University of London	City St George's (University of London)	1733	The second institution in England to provide formal medical education.	MBBS	
Warwick Medical School	Warwick	2000	A graduate-entry course in medicine. Previously Leicester-Warwick Medical School.	MBChB	
Three Counties Medical School	Worcester	2023	A four-year, graduate-entry MBChB programme	MBChB	
Chester Medical School	Chester	2024	A four-year, graduate-entry MBChB programme	MBChB	
Black Country Medical School	Wolverhampton	2026	First intake of students expected in 2027/28.	under planning	
Pears Cumbria School of Medicine	Cumbria; Imperial College London	2025	A four-year, graduate-entry MBBS programme, only for home students	MBBS	

== Scotland ==
The Wolfson Medical School at the University of Glasgow

Name	University	Established	Comments	Degree awarded	Ref.
University of Aberdeen School of Medicine	Aberdeen	1786	Medicine taught as early as the late 15th century, although no formal medical school was established until circa 1786 with a series of lectures offered by Dr George French and Dr Livingston from which the modern medical school emerged.	MBChB	
University of Dundee, School of Medicine	Dundee	1967	From 1883 to 1897, University College Dundee was independent. From 1893 to 1967 medicine was taught in Dundee as part of the University of St Andrews. After 1967, medical teaching was under the auspices of the University of Dundee.	MBChB	
University of Edinburgh Medical School	Edinburgh	1726	Medicine has been taught in this city since the 16th century. The University of Edinburgh was the first to provide formal medical training beginning in 1726.	MBChB	
Glasgow Medical School	Glasgow	1751	Medicine first taught in 1637, however the current medical school can be said to have been established with the appointment of Dr William Cullen in 1751.	MBChB	
University of St Andrews School of Medicine	St Andrews	1897	Medicine taught at St Andrews from 1413. First MD awarded 1696. First Professor appointed 1721. The medical school was established in 1897. Clinical teaching undertaken at University College, Dundee until 1967. St Andrews awards BSc (Hons), with clinical teaching and MBChB degrees provided by Partner Medical Schools with the exception of the ScotGEM program which awards a joint MB ChB with the University of Dundee.	BSc (Hons) (see comments) and MB ChB	

== Wales ==
Name	University	Established	Comments	Degree awarded	Ref.
Cardiff University School of Medicine	Cardiff	1893	Founded in 1893 and previously known as the Welsh National School of Medicine and the University of Wales College of Medicine, it was re-amalgamated into Cardiff University in 2004.	MBBCh	
Swansea University Medical School	Swansea	2001	Swansea University Medical School provides a graduate-entry course in medicine only.	MBBCh	
North Wales Medical School	Bangor	2024	Both undergraduate and graduate-entry programmes are offered.	BMBS	

== Northern Ireland ==
Name	University	Established	Comment	Degree awarded	Ref.
Queen's University Belfast Medical School	Queen's University Belfast	1821	Only United Kingdom medical school to award graduates Bachelor of Obstetrics (BAO) degree.	MB BCh BAO	
Magee School of Medicine	Ulster University	2021	A graduate entry 4-year course - first 70 students accepted in 2021	MB BS	

== Overseas territories ==
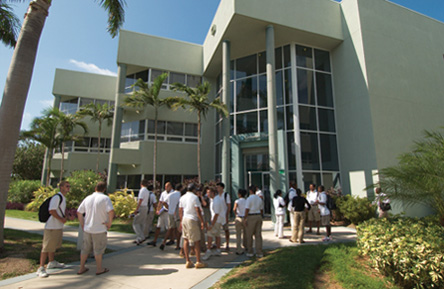
St Matthews University Campus

Name	Territory	Established	Comment	Degree awarded	Ref.
Saint James School of Medicine	Anguilla	2010 in Anguilla (previously established in 1999 in Bonaire)	Uses a US-based curriculum	MD	
St. Matthews University	Cayman Islands	2002 in the Cayman Islands (previously established in 1997 in Belize)	Uses a US-based curriculum	MD	
University of Science, Arts and Technology	Montserrat	2003		MD, MBBS	

== Overseas medical schools ==
Name	Country	Established	Comment	Degree awarded	Ref.
Newcastle University Medicine Malaysia	Malaysia	2011 in Johor Bahru, Malaysia	Uses the same curriculum as its UK counterpart	MBBS	
Queen Mary University of London, Malta Campus	Malta	2017 in Gozo, Malta		MBBS	

== See also ==
- List of pharmacy schools in the United Kingdom
- List of dental schools in the United Kingdom
- Medical school in the United Kingdom
