= List of universities in Montserrat =

This is a list of universities in Montserrat.

== Universities ==
- Montserrat Community College
- University of Science, Arts and Technology
- University of the West Indies - Montserrat campus

== See also ==
- List of universities by country
