= Medical school in the United Kingdom =

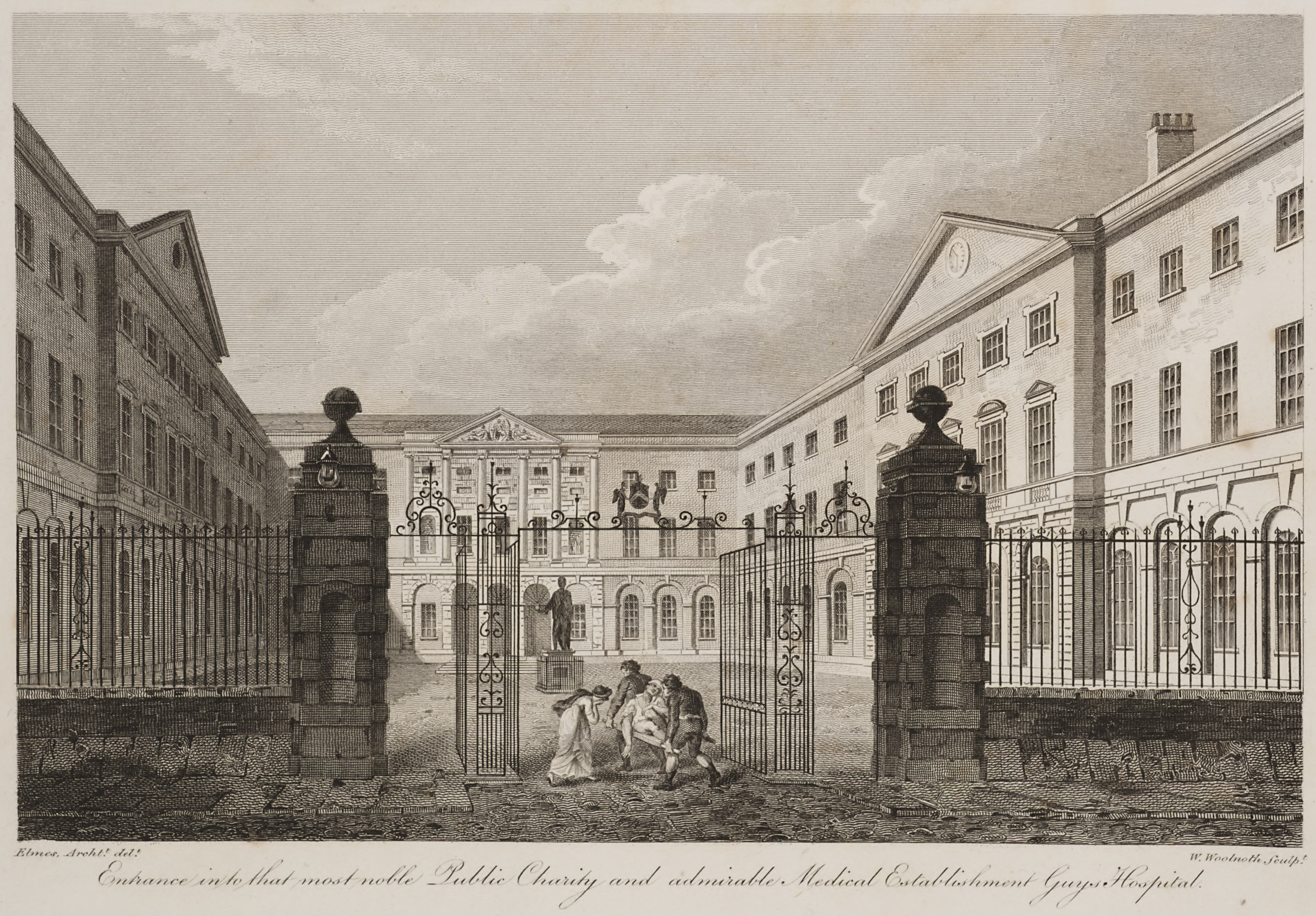
Guy's campus of King's College London Medical School depicted in 1820 by James Elmes and William Woolnoth

In the United Kingdom, medical school generally refers to a department within a university which is involved in the education of future medical practitioners. All leading British medical schools are state-funded and their core purpose is to train doctors on behalf of the National Health Service. Traditionally, courses lasted four to six years: two years of pre-clinical training in an academic environment and two to three years of clinical training at a teaching hospital and in community settings; however, many modern curricula are now integrated, combining clinical exposure with academic study throughout the course. Medical schools and teaching hospitals are closely integrated. The course of study is extended to six years if an intercalated degree is taken in a related subject.

== Admissions ==
In the United Kingdom students generally begin medical school after secondary education. This contrasts with the US and Canadian (outside Quebec) systems, where a bachelor's degree is required for entry to medical school. Entry to British medical schools is very competitive.

=== Application ===
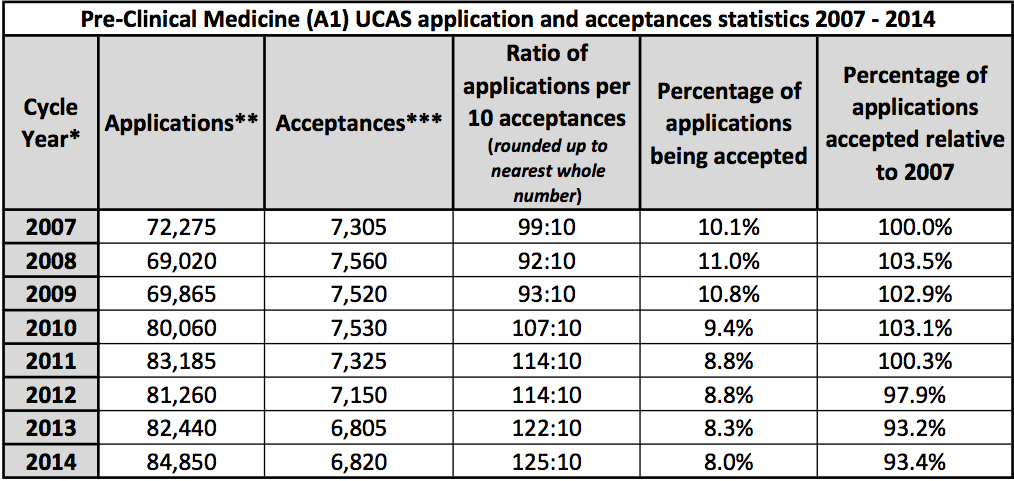
Pre-Clinical Medicine (A1) UCAS application and acceptances statistics, 2007 - 2014.

Applications for entry into medical school (in common with other university courses) are made through the Universities and Colleges Admissions Service (UCAS). UCAS allows four applications per applicant for medicine, as opposed to the usual five. The remaining one can either be left blank, or be used to apply for a non-medical course.

Most UK medical schools now also require applicants to sit additional entrance tests such as the Universities Clinical Aptitude Test (UCAT) (required by 26 universities) and the BioMedical Admissions Test (BMAT) (formerly required by 8 universities). As of 2025 entry into medical schools the BMAT has been discontinued and students now only need to sit the UCAT exams.

The number of available medical school places had risen by 3,500 since 1998. There are national quotas imposed on the number of places for students on medicine and dentistry courses in the UK as much of the training needs to occur in a healthcare setting. In 2016, places at medical school were offered through the clearing process for the first time, with St George's, University of London opening up places on its five-year medical degree undergraduate course.

The UCAS personal statement gives applicants the opportunity to write about why they are suitable for medicine. Common subjects discussed during these statements include work experience, subject research and extra-curricular activities. Personal statements are reviewed by university admission boards and applicants scoring highly in tests and with a good personal statement will be called to interview, though the exact selection procedure varies greatly between universities.

Medical schools in the United Kingdom tend to base their first sift purely on predicted grades for the main school exit exams e.g A Levels exams and UCAT scores. Once students pass through the first sift they then get invited to interview in most universities and everyone then is back in an equal playing field. The Interview then determines if students get to the next stage of an offer from the University. The key at medical schools in the UK is to ensure students get as high a UCAT score as possible. That requires hours of practice which must not be disregarded or taken lightly. The UCAT scores have a direct correlation on how much practice is done by students.

=== The interview ===
Interviews for medicine differ between individual universities. The majority of medical school interview applicants using either a Traditional interview or the Multiple Mini Interview (MMI) formats. Oxford and Cambridge medical schools have their own distinct way of interviewing with focus on science questions and other medical schools also use group tasks to assess applicants.

==== Traditional ====
The traditional medical interview consists of 2–4 interviewers sat across a table from the candidate. Interviewers take turns to ask the candidate set questions and rate their responses on a Likert scale. Interviews last between 15–30 minutes. Questions cover a range of desirable criteria that future doctors should possess.

==== Multiple Mini-Interview (MMI) ====
Developed at McMaster University Medical School in Canada in 2004, the MMI format assesses candidates as they cycle through a selection of 'mini' interview stations similar to the medical school OSCE. 1-2 interviewers assess candidates at each station (which typically last 5–8 minutes each) and each station is focussed on a particular skill desirable of a doctor. Criteria assessed at individual stations may include:

- Reasons for application to study medicine
- Influence of work experience
- Contribution to school and society
- Academic ability and intellect
- Knowledge of the course and medical careers
- Descriptive skills
- Dexterity
- Empathy
- Communication skills
- Initiative and coping under pressure
- Reasoning and problem solving skills
- Teamwork skills

== Degree awarded ==
After successful completion of clinical training a student graduates as a Bachelor of Medicine, Bachelor of Surgery, abbreviated as

- 'MB ChB' for Aberdeen, Anglia Ruskin, Aston, Birmingham, Bristol, Buckingham, Dundee, Edinburgh, Glasgow, Keele, Lancaster, Leeds, Leicester, Liverpool, Manchester, Sheffield
- 'MB ChB' for Warwick requires a first degree;
- 'MB BS' for schools currently or previously part of the University of London (King's College London GKT School of Medical Education, Barts and The London School of Medicine, St George's, UCL Medical School, Brunel University of London) and also Norwich Medical School, Hull York Medical School, Imperial College School of Medicine, University of Central Lancashire, and Newcastle University.
- 'MB BCh' for Cardiff;
- 'MB BCh' for Swansea requires a first degree;
- 'BM BCh' for Oxford,
- 'BM BS' for University of Nottingham, Peninsula Medical School - now split into the University of Exeter Medical School and the University of Plymouth Medical School and Brighton-Sussex,
- 'BMBS' for Southampton,
- 'MB BChir' for Cambridge.
- Queen's University Belfast gives the degree of 'MB BCh BAO' (BAO is Bachelor of the Art of Obstetrics).
- The University of St Andrews offers a pre-clinical BSc or BSc(Hons) with subsequent entry to either Manchester, Barts, Glasgow, Dundee, Edinburgh or Aberdeen for Clinical Teaching and a Subsequent MB ChB/equivalent

== Course types ==
Broadly speaking, undergraduate medical education in the United Kingdom may be thought of along two continuums:

- The teaching method is one continuum - on which problem based learning is one extreme, and lecture based learning is the other extreme.
- The course structure - on which a clear pre-clinical/clinical divide is one extreme, and a totally integrated curriculum would be the other extreme.

These two can be combined in different ways to form different course types, and in reality few medical schools are at the extremes of either axis but occupy a middle ground.

=== Teaching methods ===
==== Problem-based learning ====
Problem-based learning (PBL) is a principle based on the educational philosophy of the French educationalist Célestin Freinet in the 1920s, and is used in many subject areas including medicine. It was first developed in relation to medical education at McMaster University Medical School in the late 1960s. It was introduced to the UK by Manchester University. It refers to a whole process, and not merely to a specific event (the PBL tutorial).

In the UK, the focus is on a PBL-tutorial which is conducted in small groups of around 8–10 students (although this varies with seniority and between medical school) with a tutor (or facilitator) who usually comes from either a clinical or academic background, depending on the level of the course. There is an academic, clinical or ethical scenario, where the students select which areas of study to pursue in their own time. Academics at Maastricht University developed seven steps of what should happen in the PBL process:

1. The group read the scenario and clarify terms they do not understand
2. They define what the problem is
3. They brainstorm possible hypotheses or explanations
4. Come up with a possible solution
5. Define a series of learning objectives they should achieve by the next tutorial, arising out of the problem
6. Gather information to fulfil the learning objectives - this can be in the form of private study or reading; attending a lecture; having a discussion or teaching session with a relevant "expert"; attend a ward round or clinic; interview a relevant patient
7. At the next tutorial, students share the information they have gathered since the last tutorial, and discuss areas where information they have gained conflicts - this may lead to further learning objectives if they find they are still not clear.

In keeping with the ethos of self-directed learning, during sessions it encourages a shift in power from an academic tutor to the students in a PBL group. However, it will be seen that lectures, tutorials and clinical teaching sessions can play a part in problem-based learning - but the emphasis is on the student to decide how these will enable them to fulfil their learning objectives, rather than passively absorb all information.

The introduction of PBL in the UK coincided with a General Medical Council report in 2003, Tomorrow's Doctors, which recommended an increased proportion of learning should be student-centred and self-directed. This encouraged medical schools to adopt PBL, however some medical schools have adopted other methods to increase self-directed learning, whilst others (notably Oxford and Cambridge) have always had a high proportion of student-centred and self-directed learning, and have therefore not introduced PBL. Manchester Medical School adopted a new PBL curriculum in 1994, and were followed by Liverpool Medical School and Glasgow Medical School. The Norwich Medical School, at the University of East Anglia also uses a PBL based curriculum. Some of the UK medical schools created since that time have adopted problem based learning. Brighton and Sussex Medical School has a lecture-based approach supported by small-group and self-directed work. Similarly, Imperial College London employs mostly lecture-based teaching but uses supplementary teaching methods such as PBL to deliver a more rounded education.

Tomorrow's Doctors also criticised the amount of unnecessary scientific knowledge irrelevant to clinical practice that medical students were required to learn, meaning that the curricula were altered in other ways around the same time that PBL was introduced in the UK. One study criticising problem-based learning found that some medical specialist registrars and consultants believe that PBL can promote incomplete learning and educational blind spots; particularly in anatomy and basic medical sciences, due to ultimate decision making within the PBL group resting with the students. This has also brought into question whether the lack of anatomical knowledge adequately prepares graduates for surgery, or negatively affects enthusiasm to enter certain specialties; including academic medicine, surgery, pathology and microbiology., although the purposeful reduction in anatomy teaching within all medical curricula which occurred following Tomorrow's Doctors may be in part to blame for reduced anatomical knowledge, rather than it being due to PBL.

Studies have shown that students believe that PBL increases the educational effect of self study and their clinical inference ability, and although studies are conflicting, one showed that UK PRHO graduates believed that they were better at dealing with uncertainty and knowing their personal limits. Students feel less detached from clinical medicine through PBL and thus this may increase their enthusiasm for learning.

Notably, universities that pioneered successful Problem-based-learning such as University of Montreal or McMaster are themselves prestigious institutions that hold worldwide reputations for clinical and academic excellence, taking the top few percent of worldwide graduate applicants. PBL can be considered to be more suitable to teaching of graduate medicine, whose students may benefit from the maturity of an existing degree and previous experience of self-directed learning, and perhaps unsuitable for less able students and undergraduates.

==== Lecture-based learning ====
Lecture-based learning (LBL) consists of information delivered mainly through large lectures or seminars. This had been the predominant method of delivering pre-clinical medical education at many UK medical schools prior to the introduction of Tomorrow's Doctors. Teaching is delivered via large teaching events at which several hundred students may be present, which guides learning. Students are encouraged to do their own reading between lectures as the lectures will only cover the main points.

Key points in support of LBL include that students gain the opportunity to listen to leading clinicians or academics, whereas PBL tutors may be underused. Lecture-based learning is also considerably cheaper to organise, requiring fewer staff members who can deliver lectures to large numbers of students at once, rather than the large number of separate tutors needed to deliver problem-based learning to small groups of eight students.

Criticisms of lecture based learning include that students get much less interaction with both tutor and colleagues - they passively absorb information in lectures rather than questioning and searching out answers. The lack of interaction also means it is harder for tutors to know if individual students are struggling as they will only find out if students have not understood the lectures in exams, when arguably it is too late, whereas in problem-based learning, the tutor can assess how much each student is learning based on the student's participation in discussion within the weekly tutorials, and may be able to help students who are struggling earlier.

LBL has been criticised for 'spoon feeding' students and thus not preparing them for future continued medical education, which is by necessity, self-directed. However, most lecture-based curricula involve a significant proportion of students doing self-directed reading between lectures. Some have also criticised lecture based learning for overloading students with information that may not be relevant to their first years in clinical practice, however this has more to do with curriculum design and course structure than teaching method.

Both lecture-based learning and problem-based learning may involve teaching from academics who are not medically qualified themselves.

One meta-analysis has suggested that PBL education produces graduates with no better factual or clinical knowledge than students from a lecture-based course, despite in some cases the graduates' belief that they are, questioning whether PBL learning is merely a popular trend.

=== Course structure ===
Undergraduate medical curricula can be divided on the basis of how they integrate or separate the theoretical learning in areas such as anatomy, physiology, ethics, psychology and biochemistry from the clinical areas such as medicine, surgery, obstetrics, paediatrics.

Traditionally, medical courses entirely split the theoretical learning, teaching this on its own for 2–3 years in a pre-clinical course before students went on to study clinical subjects on their own for a further 3 years in a clinical course. In some cases, these were taught at geographically distinct sites or even separate universities, with an entirely separate staff for each course, sometimes with the award of a BA or BSc at the end of the pre-clinical course. St Andrews, Cambridge and Oxford Universities are three of the most traditional pre-clinical medical schools- For example, the Cambridge first year of the Medical Sciences tripos is split into anatomy, biochemistry and physiology. Whilst there is a nominal "Preparing for Patients" aspect to the course when the students speak to real patients, this comprises a total of three afternoons over the entire year.

There has been a move for universities have tended to integrate teaching into "systems-based teaching" rather than "subject-based teaching". E.g. rather than studying separate distinct modules in anatomy, physiology, ethics, psychology and biochemistry, students study distinct modules in different body systems, e.g. "heart and lungs" or "nervous system" - during which they will study the anatomy, physiology, biochemistry, psychology, etc. relevant to that system. The same also has happened with clinical subjects, so for example rather than studying "medicine" and "surgery" separately, students may have a "heart" module in which they study clinical cardiology and cardiothoracic surgery together. In some medical schools there is integration of clinical and pre-clinical subjects together - e.g. a "heart" module would include anatomy of the heart, physiology of the heart, clinical examination, clinical cardiology and cardiothoracic surgery being studied in one module.

Since Tomorrow's Doctors, there has been a move in the UK towards integrating clinical and non-clinical subjects together to a greater extent. This has varied considerably between universities, always with an emphasis towards non-clinical subjects towards the start of the course and clinical subjects towards the end. A variety of models are in operation. Any model may use PBL or LBL learning methods: for example Manchester has a PBL-based curriculum but a strong pre-clinical/clinical divide, whilst Brighton and Sussex Medical School has a more integrated curriculum, delivered via a lecture-based programme. Many factors influence the choice of model, including the educational philosophy of the institution and the distance of the attached teaching hospitals to the university base (it is much easier for universities with teaching hospitals nearby to offer an integrated curriculum).

Models include:

- 2/3+2+1 (London, St Andrews, Edinburgh, Oxford and Cambridge)
  - 2/3 year pre-clinical course in which predominantly non-clinical subjects are studied, with occasional day or half-day "early experience" events where students will visit a hospital, a General Practice or visit a family in their home. Reference to clinical application of knowledge may be made, but little interaction with patients at this stage. Exam at end of this in pre-clinical subjects only.
  - 2 years clinical subjects studied
  - 1 year "preparing for practice" where students will consolidate knowledge, go on elective attachments, sit finals exams with emphasis of finals on clinical subjects
- 1+3+1
  - 1 year basic introduction to general principles of pre-clinical subjects
  - 3 years combination of pre-clinical and clinical teaching with a ratio of 1:2 nonclinical:clinical subjects, often taught in systems-based "blocks" - 'e.g. 4 weeks studying anatomy and physiology of heart followed by 8 weeks studying clinical cardiology'
  - 1 year consolidating knowledge, elective attachments, sit finals exams - often integrated exams incorporating clinical and non-clinical testing
- 1+2+2 (e.g. Cardiff)
  - 1 years studying basic principles of pre-clinical subjects
  - 2 years studying pre-clinical and clinical subjects with equal weight given to both, again in system based blocks 'e.g. 6 weeks studying anatomy and physiology of heart followed by 6 weeks studying clinical cardiology'
  - 2 years predominantly clinical teaching and consolidation of knowledge, during which time electives and finals exams will occur

Support for a less integrated course includes that it achieves a basic scientific foundation from which to build clinical knowledge upon in later years. However it is criticised for producing graduates with inferior communication skills and making transition into the clinical environment more difficult in year 3 or 4. Support for a more integrated course includes that by allowing patient interaction early, the course produces students who are more at ease with communicating with patients and better developed interpersonal skills. Criticisms include, questioning whether students in the first year have a place in the healthcare environment, when actual clinical knowledge may be virtually nil.

Tomorrow's Doctors also led to the introduction of significant student choice in the syllabus in the form of student selected components.

== Immediate post-graduation period ==
After graduation medical students enter paid employment, as a Foundation House Officer (FHO), during which they will complete the first year of Foundation Training. Foundation training focusses on the seven principles of the MMC training ethos: trainee centred, competency assessed, service based, quality assured, flexible, coached, and structured & streamlined. Graduates are still a year away from obtaining full registration with the General Medical Council. During this year trainees are legally only able to work in certain supervised jobs, as a Foundation House Officer 1 (FHO1), and cannot legally practise independently, and it is the responsibility of the medical school they attended to supervise this year until they are fully registered with the General Medical Council.

Students in their final year will begin the process of applying for jobs. The new system, called the UK Foundation Programme, (implemented by the NHS Modernising Medical Careers) involves a simplified online application process, without interviews, based on a matching scheme. Students rank their preferred Foundation Schools (which often comprise a catchment area of two or three cities). They are ranked based both on the answers given on their application form, and their marks gained in examinations during their undergraduate career, the resulting score determines which job the student will get when they graduate. After being selected to a Foundation School, applicants are then selected into specific jobs by a selection procedure determined locally by each Foundation School, which may include an interview, submission of a CV or use of the score gained in MTAS.

Previously, another online system called Multi-Deanery Application Process (MDAP) system was used for applications to the Foundation Programme in some areas of the UK. This was criticised in the media and in some medical publications, and was replaced by Medical Training Application System in 2006.

== Graduate entry programmes ==
Recently several four year graduate entry schemes have been introduced in some English and Welsh medical schools which cover a similar range and depth of knowledge to the undergraduate scheme but at a more intensive pace. The accelerated pace is largely in the pre-clinical phase of the medical programme, with the GMC mandating a minimum number of clinical hours in the clinical phase of medical degrees.

These courses have a limited number of spaces and include some funding after the first year, so competition is very high. Some sources report in the region of 60 applicants for each place as these courses have become more widely known. Until relatively recently, people over thirty were strongly discouraged from applying. Entrance to these programmes usually involves sitting a competitive selection test. The most common entry examinations are the GAMSAT (Graduate Australian Medical Schools Admissions Test) or MSAT (Medical Schools Admissions Test). Some schools may use existing entrance examinations that school leavers are also usually required to take e.g. UKCAT or BMAT (see above).

The admissions criteria for these graduate entry programmes vary between universities - some universities require the applicant's first degree to be in a science-related discipline, whereas others will accept a degree in any subject as sufficient evidence of academic ability.

The following universities offer four year graduate entry programmes:

- University of Bristol
- University of Cambridge (candidate may offer BMAT)
- Cardiff University
- University of Dundee (as part of Scottish Graduate Entry Medicine) (require UKCAT and GAMSAT)
- Keele University (require GAMSAT)
- King's College London (require UKCAT)
- University of Leicester (require UKCAT)
- University of Liverpool (require GAMSAT)
- Newcastle University (require UKCAT)
- University of Nottingham (require GAMSAT)
- University of Oxford (require BMAT)
- Barts and The London, Queen Mary's School of Medicine and Dentistry (require UKCAT)
- University of Southampton (require UKCAT)
- St George's, University of London (require GAMSAT)
- Bute Medical School (St Andrews) (as part of Scottish Graduate Entry Medicine) (require UKCAT and GAMSAT)
- Swansea University (require GAMSAT)
- University of Warwick (require UKCAT)
- Imperial College London (require BMAT)

However, graduates are free to apply to some of the regular five/six year courses. Indeed, universities offering both graduate entry and school leaver entry courses often encourage applications to one of the two course types, depending on the graduate's educational background.

== Intercalated degrees ==
Some medical students spend one or two additional years at medical school (lengthening a five-year course to six or seven years) studying for an intercalated degree. This is an extra degree awarded in addition to their medical degrees, giving the student the opportunity to gain an extra qualification, and aids students' research and individual study skills. At the end of this intercalated year or two students are awarded a degree, which is variously styled as BSc, BA, MSc, BMSc (Hons), BMedSci(Hons), MA, MPH, MClinEd depending on the university, level of award, and subject studied. Usually students complete an intercalated bachelor's degree the year after completing the second or third year of their medical course. Master's degrees are offered at some schools for students who have completed the fourth year of their medical course. Higher research related masters and academic doctorates are typically undertaken at the end of the fifth year of the course. There is typically strong competition to secure funding from external institutions such as pharmaceutical companies, as such research related intercalated degrees may be in an area the student has little long-term interest, a frequent criticism. The major benefit of an intercalated degree is the increased chance of selection to competitive training routes such as Academic Medicine or Surgery.

The way the programme is implemented varies across the country: sometimes the intercalated degree will be specifically for medical students (e.g. a supervisor-led research project culminating in a dissertation), whilst sometimes the intercalated student will complete taught courses offered to final year BSc or masters students, or a combination of these. At some medical schools the intercalated degree may be undertaken in a specific subjects (e.g. Immunology, Pathology, Cardiovascular Science, Respiratory Science, Social Medicine, Management, History Of Medicine, Humanities etc.), whilst at other medical schools there is a common curriculum for all intercalated students (often with some choice within it).

At many medical schools, the year is optional, and a relatively small percentage of students elect to study for it. At the University of Nottingham, all students undertake a research project and dissertation under the supervision of schools within the Faculty of Medicine and Health Sciences, leading to a BMedSci (Hons) Degree in the third year. Whilst this additional degree is uniquely awarded within the five-year period of study, Nottingham medical students undertake heavily extended third and fourth years of up to 48 weeks in order to accomplish both the BMedSci and early clinical training.

In contrast to this, all students at University College London, Imperial College London, Bute Medical School (St Andrews), University of Oxford, University of Edinburgh and University of Cambridge study for a BSc/BA in addition to their medical degrees. These five medical schools have a six-year curriculum, in which students complete a three-year pre-clinical course, which leads to a BSc or BA, followed by a three-year clinical course, which in combination with the BSc or BA leads to a full medical degree. The degree awarded is BA at Oxford and Cambridge (which later becomes an MA), and BSc at the others. At these five medical schools, it is sometimes also possible to spend extra optional year(s) where one can study for an intercalated masters or doctoral degree in addition to the BSc/BA which all students receive, for example, the University of Cambridge offers an MB PhD programme of nine years total duration comprising preclinical training, the intercalated BA (see above), clinical training and within the clinical training period a PhD. University College London also offers an MB PhD programme which can be completed in nine years of study.

Degrees are classified according to the British undergraduate degree classification system. This is taken into account in the Foundation Schools Application Form, in which applicants are awarded extra points for a higher class degree. As of 2012, intercalated degrees are able to contribute the maximum of 4 points to the foundation year 1 posts application. The number of points awarded is as following: 4 for a first class, 3 points for a 2.1 class, 2 points for 2.2 class and 1 point for a third class.

== Medical student life ==
Most UK medical students belong to student unions, or groups set up within the university's students' union and run by and for medical students, typically organising social events (such as Balls/formals), sporting events (e.g. the National Association of Medics' Sports (NAMS) and academic events or career events. Four medical schools have separate student unions for medical students: Imperial College School of Medicine Students' Union, Edinburgh's Royal Medical Society, UCL (RUMS: Royal Free, University College and Middlesex Medical Students' Society) & Barts & The London Student's Association.

The United Kingdom Medical Students Association (UKMSA) is a nationally based student-doctor collaboration which unites medical societies and their student members across different universities in the UK. The current (2017) president is Andrew Cole, and the vice president is Michael Grant.

Meducation is an online revision and learning tool that encourages social interaction between medical students worldwide. It has 30,000 users.

The largest free publication in the UK for medical students is the award-winning Medical Student Newspaper. It is written and produced entirely by medical students and is distributed in hard copy to the five medical schools of London, and available online for all.

Many students also focus on extracurricular academic activities, for example many UK schools have their own student society dedicated to improving health both within the local area through various action projects and globally, through campaigning and working abroad. Medsin is a fully student run network of healthcare students and is the UK's member of the International Federation of Medical Students' Associations. Other societies are dedicated to raising awareness about careers in specialties such as surgery and general practice.

There are many student awards available, varying in prestige, from local university awards to national awards. Considered the most prestigious award for a medical student in the UK is the currently Medical Student of the Year, hosted by The Royal Society of Medicine and the Royal College of Psychiatrists. This is largely because the other colleges have no such award, with the normal national prizes being named after experts in that field.

== See also ==
- Medical education in the United Kingdom
- List of medical schools in the United Kingdom
- Medical education in Wales
- Medical education in Scotland
