= School of Health and Rehabilitation (Keele University) =

University department

Keele University School of Allied Health Professions and Pharmacy
- Established: 1994
- Parent institution: Keele University
- Director: Anne V O'Brien
- Administrative staff: 40
- Students: 250
- Location: Keele, Staffordshire, England
- Website: www.keele.ac.uk/ahp

Keele University School of Allied Health Professions and Pharmacy is a teaching department of Keele University, Staffordshire, England. All programmes offered by the school are taught in the MacKay Building on the Keele University campus near Newcastle-under-Lyme. The school also uses facilities at the Keele University Medical School and from the wider university. The school offers educational programmes at undergraduate and postgraduate levels. There is an active research focus within the school with many of the teaching staff being members of Research Institutes at the university. The school is a regional hub of the National Physiotherapy Research Network.

== History ==
The school was originally known as The Oswestry and North Staffordshire School of Physiotherapy (ONSSP) located at the Robert Jones and Agnes Hunt Orthopaedic Hospital in Oswestry, Shropshire. It had its first intake of students in 1939 and awarded graduates a Diploma of Physiotherapy. The development and implementation of a physiotherapy honours degree programme at Keele University was a collaborative venture between the university and ONSSP. Co-operation between representative members of the ONSSP and collaborating departments of the university led to the development of an integrated course. At that time, the school remained an autonomous institution based at Oswestry, working in collaboration with the university.

In 1994 the ONSSP transferred on to the Keele University campus becoming the Department of Physiotherapy Studies. The department moved into permanent premises in the MacKay Building in January 1995. During this time a new integrated modular course was developed in order to fully integrate the department into the university structure. The university, Chartered Society of Physiotherapy and the Council of Professions Supplementary to Medicine (now known as the Health Professions Council) validated this course in June 1995. The school worked towards consolidation of the undergraduate course, development of research activity and expansion of the Postgraduate portfolio. In September 2004 the school changed its name to the School of Health and Rehabilitation to reflect the fact that its current and future activities encompassed more than Physiotherapy education.

== Programmes ==
=== Undergraduate ===
- BSc Physiotherapy

The Physiotherapy programme is the largest in terms of student numbers. It is a full-time, three-year honours degree. It is validated by the Health Professions Council and is a Chartered Society of Physiotherapy approved programme. The clinical part of the programme is in six blocks over the three years. Placements are at a variety of locations across, Staffordshire, Cheshire, Shropshire and the West Midlands. The physiotherapy programme has students from the UK, European Union, Asia and North America.

- BSc Rehabilitation Science

BSc (Hons) Rehabilitation Science was introduced in 2015 with the aim to give students the opportunity to explore the concepts of rehabilitation and management from a physical as well as psychological health perspective. Like the BSc physiotherapy course, it is a full-time, three-year honours degree.

- BSc Radiology (Diagnostic Imaging)

This new Radiology degree with its first intake in 2017 aims to bridge the UK wide national gap of qualified hospital imaging specialists.

=== Postgraduate ===
- MSc in Prosthetics and Orthotics
- MSc Physiotherapy
- MSc Physiotherapy (Neurology)
- MSc Physiotherapy (cardio-respiratory)
- MSc Neuromusculoskeletal Healthcare
- MSc Pain Science and Management
- MSc Neurological Rehabilitation
- MSc Health Sciences
- PG Certificate Applied Clinical Anatomy

The seven MSc programmes can be studied either full-time or part-time. As modularised programmes, students can choose optional modules once the core components are completed. This can allow the student to personalise much of the content of chosen strand making the degree flexible to meet employer demands or personal interests. There are alternative exit points that allow the candidate to graduate with a Postgraduate Certificate or a Postgraduate Diploma if they choose not to progress to the MSc.

== Rankings ==
Rankings
National rankings
- Complete (2026): 4
- Guardian (2026): 4
- Times / Sunday Times (2026): 4

SAHP has consistently ranked in the top 5 institutions in the country complementing the Medical school offering. The school has also celebrated three consecutive years of 100% student satisfaction (Unistats 2016) for the standard bearer BSc (Hons) Physiotherapy programme in the National Student Survey, 2016.

Moreover, according to The Guardian University Guide, the average UCAS entry points on entry was 426 with 100% of students enrolled finding employment 6 months after graduation.
