= Kent and Medway Medical School =

Medical school in Canterbury, England

- Parent institution: Canterbury Christ Church University; University of Kent
- Location: Kent, England
- Website: kmms.ac.uk

Kent and Medway Medical School (KMMS) is a medical school based in Canterbury, Kent. It was created as a partnership between the University of Kent and Canterbury Christ Church University and offers around 110 places per year. Brighton and Sussex Medical School (BSMS) acts as the contingency school. KMMS offers five-year undergraduate programs, with a focus on specialties currently underrepresented in Kent and Medway.

== History ==
Funding for KMMS was announced in March 2018 following a competition to allocate 1500 new medical training posts across England. Stages 1 and 2 of the General Medical Council (GMC) accreditation process for new schools were completed in advance of this announcement. The Founding Dean was appointed in September 2018 and stages 3 to 6 of the GMC accreditation were completed before the first 100 students enrolled in September 2020. The first cohort of medical students from KMMS graduated on 17 September 2025; 44% of the graduating cohort were allocated to the local Kent, Surrey and Sussex deanery of the UK Foundation Programme.

== Teaching ==
Starting from the 2020/2021 academic year, the school has a single, 5-year undergraduate (UG) Bachelor of Medicine Bachelor of Surgery (BM BS) program leading to a Primary Medical Qualification (PMQ) accredited by the GMC since summer 2025.

=== Undergraduate Program ===
==== Structure ====
The undergraduate program is linked to the five-year program offered by the KMMS' contingency school BSMS. It starts with two years of systems-based modules which cover the major body systems and include the foundational biopsychosocial knowledge required before years 3–5. Years 1 and 2 also includes a Skills for Clinical Practice (SCP) module, a Professional Development and Person-Centered Care (PDPCP) module and a Community and Primary Care in Practice (CPCP) module which each lasts for the full academic year. The CPCP modules include immersion weeks of placement in General Practice and Community Health. There are 6 weeks of clinical placement in year 1 and 2. This amounts to one of the largest amounts of clinical placement time in the early stages of the program of any UK medical school.

Years 3, 4, and 5 are based on the principle of Longitudinal Integrated Placements (LIPs), involving students spending nearly the entire academic year on placement. Students undertake two Integrated Practice modules in years 3 and 4 respectively, as well as specialist rotations and an individual research project in year 4.

Following senior rotations in year 5, final exams happen around Easter time and are followed by an Elective module and a Transition to Practice module.

==== Student-selected components (SSCs) ====
KMMS students have the opportunity to engage in some compulsory, but student-selected activities. As in the BSMS program students complete SSCs in Years 1 and 2. In year 4 there is a yearlong module called the Individual Research Project and in year 5 there is an Elective module.

==== Intercalation ====
After the 3rd year, KMMS students have the option to do an intercalated bachelor's degree, and after 4th year they can choose to do an intercalated master's degree.

==== Admissions ====
As one of five new schools which were granted places in 2018, KMMS states its mission is to increase participation in medicine by broadening the demographic of students who get the opportunity to become doctors. In 2019 and 2020 it has received approximately 1500 applications for 100 places.

KMMS receives applications from school leavers, graduate entrants and from people who have completed Access to Medicine programs. All applicants must apply via the Universities and Colleges Admissions Service (UCAS) and complete the University Clinical Aptitude Test (UCAT) in the year that they apply to the school.

After application and shortlisting all selected applicants are invited to a Multiple Mini Interview (MMI).

The school issues offer letters to selected applicants in time with the UCAS timeline for medical and dental programs.
