= David Crossman =

British physician and administrator

Professor David Crossman CBE FRSE FRCP FRCPE
- Born: David Christopher Crossman; 20 July 1957 (age 69)
- Education: St Bartholomew's Hospital Medical College
- Scientific career
- Fields: Cardiology
- Workplaces: University of East Anglia; University of Sheffield; University of St. Andrews

David Christopher Crossman (born 20 July 1957) is a physician who was the Dean of the University of St Andrews School of Medicine from 2014 to 2025 and was the Chief Scientist (Health) within the Health and Social Care Directorates of the Scottish Government from 2017 to 2022.

== Early life and education ==
Crossman was born in 1957 has attributed his interest in cardiology to Christiaan Barnard doing the first heart transplant in 1967 while he was having his tonsils removed. Following this ambition of being a cardiologist, Crossman studied medicine at St Bartholomew's Hospital Medical College and in 1979 with a first class BSc in Physiology and in 1982 with an MBBS degree.

== Career ==
Crossman trained in clinical pharmacology and worked at Hammersmith Hospital in London from 1985 under Celia Oakley and Attilio Maseri before becoming Professor of Clinical Cardiology at the University of Sheffield in 1994. While in this role, Crossman was director of a National Institute for Health Research research unit. In 2011, Crossman became the Dean of Medicine at the University of East Anglia. In 2014 Crossman then moved to be the Dean and Bute Chair of Medicine at the University of St Andrews School of Medicine. During his tenure at St. Andrews, Crossman oversaw the return of degree awarding powers to the medical school and the establishment of a graduate-entry medicine degree at the University of St. Andrews.

In addition, Crossman was Chairman of the Efficacy and Mechanism Evaluation (EME) Board within the National Institute for Health Research from 2016 to 2019, succeeding Rajesh Thakker in the role.

Crossman was appointed an Honorary Fellow of the British Pharmacological Society in 2020.

== Chief Scientist for Health ==
In November 2017 Crossman was appointed as the Chief Scientist (Health) within the Health and Social Care Directorates of the Scottish Government, succeeding Professor Andrew Morris who in turn had succeeded Professor Sir John Savill. In this role, Crossman was one of the fifteen members of the Office for Strategic Coordination of Health Research (OSCHR).

During the COVID-19 pandemic Crossman served as Vice-Chairman of the Scottish Government COVID-19 advisory group and as Chair of the Scottish Government COVID-19 Test Strategy Group.

Crossman concluded his term as Chief Scientist (Health) in June 2022. On his departure, Cabinet Secretary for Health Humza Yousaf thanked Crossman for his service. Crossman was appointed Commander of the Order of the British Empire (CBE) in the 2023 New Year Honours for services to public health in Scotland.
