= University of St Andrews School of Medicine =

Medical school in Fife, Scotland

Coordinates: 56.338°N 2.794°W

- Former name: Bute Medical School
- Type: Medical school
- Established: 1413
- Parent institution: University of St Andrews
- Dean: Deborah Williamson
- Administrative staff: 54
- Students: 464
- Location: St Andrews, Fife, Scotland
Colours
- Website: medicine.st-andrews.ac.uk

The University of St Andrews School of Medicine (formerly the Bute Medical School) is the school of medicine at the University of St Andrews in St Andrews, Fife, Scotland and is the oldest medical school in Scotland.

The medical school offers several programmes to students, the BSc (Hons) in Medicine program teaches medical students for the first three years of their training, with students completing this training, earning their MB ChB/MBBS at various partner medical schools in the UK in a pre-arranged fashion. From September 2025 onwards, a 5-year MB ChB will be offered with a particular focus on community healthcare. The school also offers a 4-year graduate entry medical program in combination with the University of Dundee, awarding a joint MB ChB from the University of St Andrews and Dundee.

The medical school in 2025 was ranked 6th in the UK by The Times University Guide and 7th by The Guardian University Guide. The school is associated with 1 Nobel Prize and 2 Victoria Cross winners. Famous alumni include small pox vaccine pioneer Edward Jenner, revolutionary journalist Jean-Paul Marat, and inventor of beta blockers and H2 receptor antagonists, Nobel Prize in Medicine winner Sir James Black.

== History ==
=== The early medical school ===
Medicine was the third subject to be taught at the University of St Andrews, at St Salvator's College and later the United College of St Salvator and St Leonard. Bishop Kennedy founded St Salvator's College in 1450, confirmed by a papal bull in 1458.

From the 17th to the 19th centuries, medical degrees from St Andrews were awarded by an early version of distance learning. The university awarded the degree of MD to individuals who were usually already established in medical practice, the first being conferred in 1696. This degree was awarded on the basis of a testimonial written by a supervisor, and a fee was paid to the university. The whole process was conducted through the post, and the candidate did not have to visit the university. Recipients of the MD at this time include the French Revolutionary, Jean-Paul Marat (1743–1793), who obtained his MD in 1775 for an essay on gonorrhea, and Edward Jenner (1749–1823), who developed the first smallpox vaccine, and was awarded the MD in 1792.

In 1721, the chancellor of the university, James Brydges, 1st Duke of Chandos, established the Chandos Chair of Medicine and Anatomy, to fund the appointment of a Professor of Medicine and Anatomy at the university, and Thomas Simson was appointed as the first Chandos Professor. The Chandos Chair still exists, although it has now become a chair of physiology.

In the early 19th century, examinations were introduced. Students had to visit St Andrews to sit them, but there was no teaching at the university.

=== The founding of the Bute Medical School ===
In 1897, as Rector of the University of St Andrews, the 3rd Marquess of Bute, in addition to his provident restorations of other university buildings, initiated the construction of the current Bute Medical Buildings, south of St Mary's College, completed in 1899. The buildings, much added to and modified, especially after a gift from Andrew Carnegie, built labs to the north (now the Carnegie Building). These provided for the establishment of a regular medical school, which both taught and examined medical students. The 3rd Marquess of Bute also provided for the establishment of a new chair of medicine—the Bute Chair of Medicine.

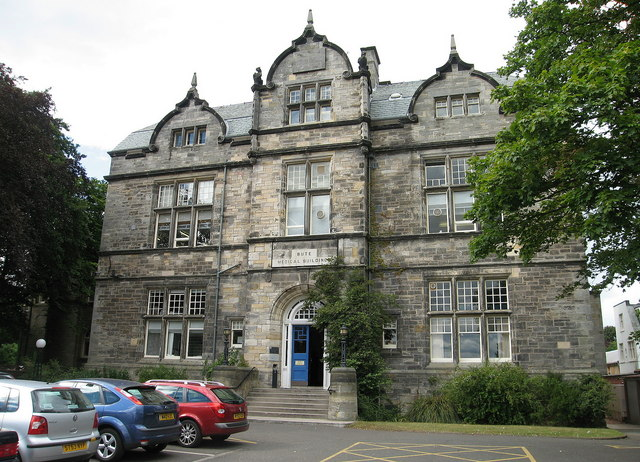
Bute Medical Building

=== The St Andrews-Dundee course ===
In 1898, University College Dundee - which had been created in 1891 - became affiliated to the University of St Andrews, and it was this that enabled a full undergraduate medical degree to be offered by St Andrews, as the City of Dundee had a large population and contained several hospitals where students could receive clinical teaching. Together, the Bute Medical School and clinical facilities at University College Dundee formed a conjoint medical school.

Medical students could either undertake their pre-clinical teaching at the Bute Medical School in St Andrews or go straight to Dundee for their pre-clinical years, and then the two groups combined to complete their clinical training in Dundee. Students were awarded the degree of MB ChB by the University of St Andrews.

In 1954, University College Dundee changed its name to Queen's College, but remained part of the University of St Andrews.

In August 1967, following recommendations by the Robbins Report, the Universities (Scotland) Act 1966 came into force. This separated Queen's College from the University of St Andrews, and granted independent university status to the new University of Dundee.

The medical school at the University of Dundee inherited the medical traditions of St Andrews University. The same applies to the Dundee dental school.

As the clinical part of the medical school (along with other parts of the University of St Andrews, including the Law and Engineering Faculties) had been completely based in Dundee, this left St Andrews with no clinical medical school or teaching hospital in which medical students could receive clinical training. The Universities (Scotland) Act 1966 also removed the University of St Andrews's right to award undergraduate and postgraduate degrees in medicine, including the MBChB and MD. However, in more recent times the right to award the MD (St Andrews) has been restored by the St. Andrews (Degrees in Medicine and Dentistry) Act 2021.

=== The link with the Medical Schools of Manchester and Keele ===
In order to continue to be able to offer access to a medical degree, St Andrews established a new link with the English Victoria University of Manchester in 1970, which was at that time seeking to enlarge its medical school. Students completed a three-year BSc in medical science at St Andrews, and could optionally complete an extra intercalated year for the award of BSc Hons at St Andrews, before completing their clinical training at the University of Manchester, with the final MBChB awarded by Manchester.

Between 2002 and 2006 there was also the ‘option’ (mostly allocated on a compulsory basis) of completing clinical training at Keele University Medical School in Stoke-on-Trent, and annually around twenty St Andrews graduates went to Keele University. This option no longer exists for students.

=== Recent history ===
Major changes to the curriculum were made in 2000 with increased emphasis on psychology and cellular biology, with the introduction of a two-year course in cellular and molecular medicine and a three-year course in behavioural sciences. Further curriculum changes took place in 2004, with a reduction in the amount of teaching but the introduction of a research project into the final year, allowing for an honours degree to be attained after three years' study, and therefore since September 2005, the University of St Andrews has offered a Bachelor of Science with honours in Medicine (BSc Hons Medicine).

== Admissions ==
St Andrews uses the multiple mini interview format, an interview system first developed by McMaster University Medical School which exposes applicants to several interviews of shorter time, exposing the applicant to more interviewers and reducing the chance that one bad or good interview determines the applicants success at gaining admissions.

== Courses ==
=== Medical degree programme ===
The BSc (Hons) programme is three years long; on graduating from St Andrews, students will progress to one of the university's partner medical schools in Scotland or England for a further three years. Partner medical schools include Aberdeen, Queen Mary University of London, Dundee, Edinburgh, Glasgow and Manchester. Applicants who are ‘overseas’ for fee purposes will progress to the Medical School at Manchester. The school also runs the Scottish-Canadian Medical Programme jointly with Edinburgh and the University of Alberta Faculty of Medicine and Dentistry for Canadian students.

At the end of the six-year programme, students will have completed their training as a doctor and graduate with MBChB/MBBS.

==== First year ====
In the first year of the course, the modules provide a scientific foundation for clinical practice. Students also commence communication and clinical skills training, alongside patient interaction, which continues throughout all three years.

==== Second year ====
The Honours programme, which runs through both second and third year, focuses in detail upon the normal function and dysfunction of specific physiological systems. Students attend a range of community-based clinical placements.

==== Third year ====
In third year, the first semester focuses on complex integrative physiological systems (central nervous system and endocrine organs). Semester 2 is focused on a significant student-selected Honours research project, as well as the application of medicine and developing clinical skills. Students participate in secondary care based clinical placements.

=== Scottish Community Orientated Medicine (ScotCOM) ===
From September 2025 onwards, a five-year MB ChB will be offered to students with clinical training conducted in hospitals and healthcare settings across NHS Fife. The degree will have a unique focus on community healthcare.

=== Scottish Graduate Entry Medicine (ScotGEM) ===
ScotGEM is an intensive four-year graduate entry medicine programme run by the universities of St Andrews and Dundee in collaboration with four health boards: NHS Fife, Tayside, Highland and Dumfries and Galloway.

The course is led for first and second year by the University of St Andrews and in third and fourth year by the University of Dundee. The course focuses on rural medicine and healthcare improvement with students living and studying in rural areas from second year onwards.

The course undertook its first cohort of students in 2018 with the intention of graduating students in September 2022 and awarding a joint degree from the University of St Andrews and the University of Dundee.

=== Postgraduate ===
In 2002 the Scottish Parliament passed the University of St Andrews (Postgraduate Medical Degrees) Act 2002 which re-instated the university's right to award the postgraduate research degree of Medicinae Doctor (MD) to students who have completed two years of full-time or up to 5 years of part-time research, which had been removed by the Universities (Scotland) Act 1966. The first MD since 1967 was awarded in 2004.

== Facilities and buildings ==
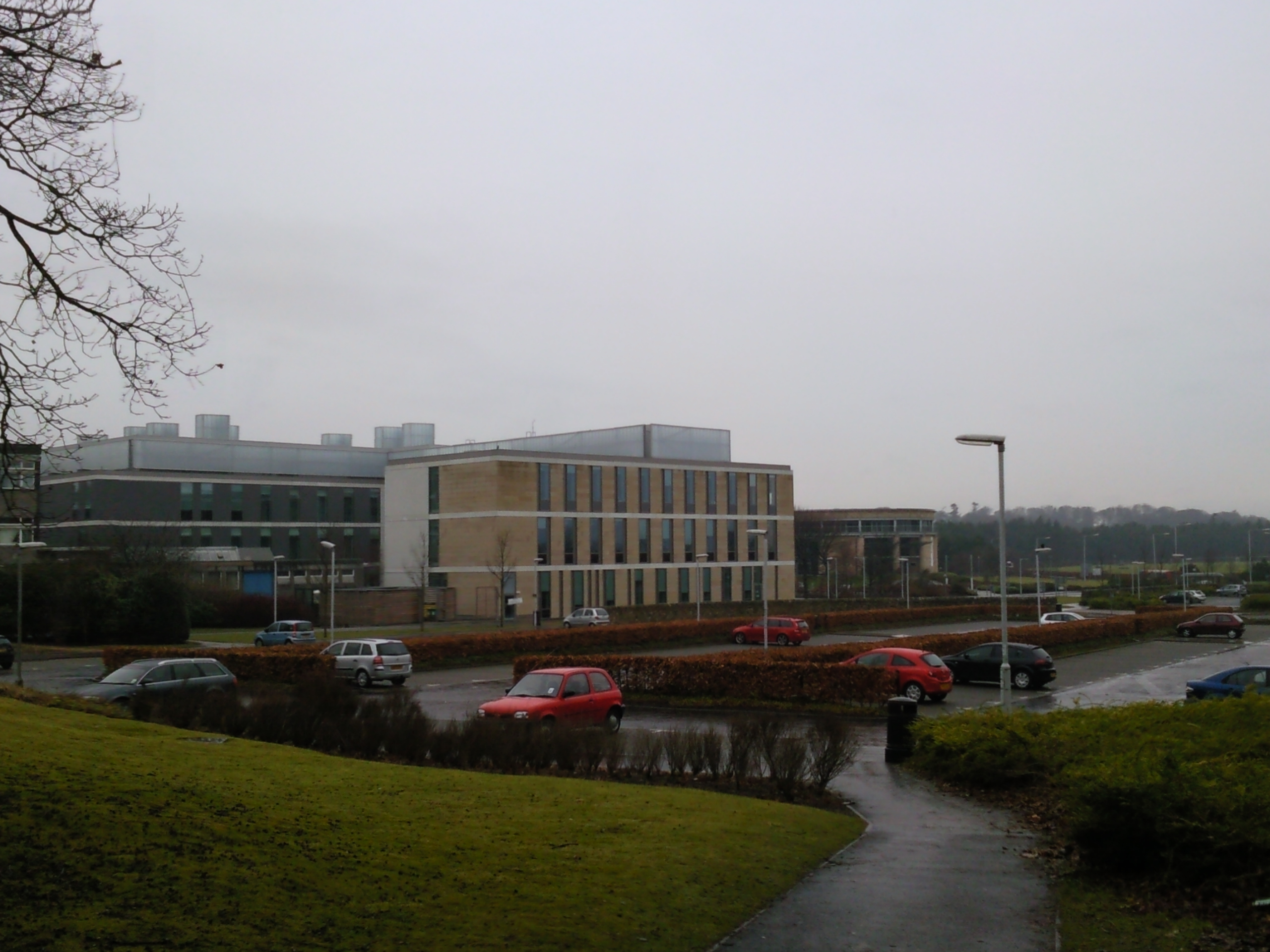
New Medical School

The University of St Andrews’ new Medical and Biological Sciences Building brings together the medical school (relocated from the Bute Building), biologists, physicists and chemists, while also linking to the School of Physics and Astronomy via a first-floor bridge—making it one of the first medical schools in the UK to fully integrate research facilities across the sciences.

The School, which has been built at a cost of £45m, contains research laboratory space, as well as teaching facilities and a lecture theatre.

== Medical Societies ==
Over recent years, many medical societies have been developed, alongside the historical Bute Medical Society, to help incorporate the clinical aspects into the course—one which was traditionally science-based only. These societies include Surgical, Clinical and Preventative medical societies.

=== The Bute Medical Society ===
Bute Medical School Scarf

The Bute Medical Society was founded in 1915, by its first president Margaret Shirlaw, with the support of Miss Mildred Clark, Calum McCrimmon, Clive Mackie Whyte, Cecily Thistlewaite, Mary Ellison and W.G. Robertson. The initial aim of the society was to hold clinically oriented lectures that the students could attend voluntarily. This tradition still continues today with the society's bimonthly 'cheese and wine' evening. As an independent, non-profit organisation it is still run entirely by medical students, supported by some sponsorship. Fundraising events held throughout the year also enable the society to contribute to charities.

=== PALS (Peer Assisted Learning Scheme) ===
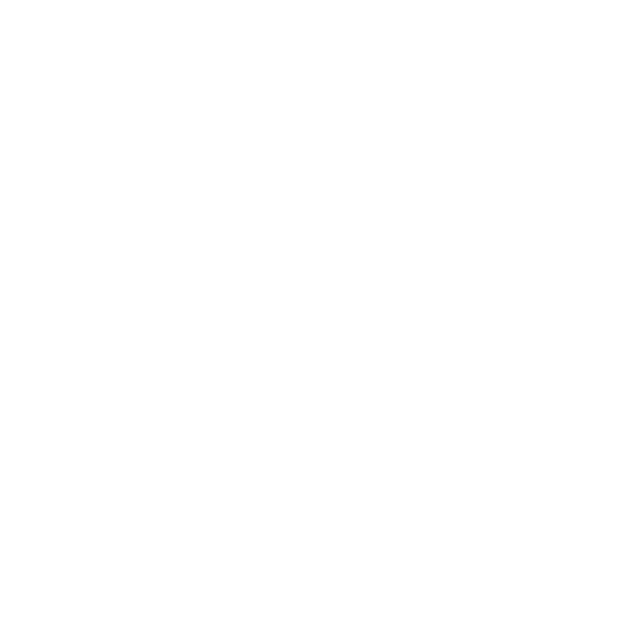
Peer Assisted Learning Scheme

The Peer Assisted Learning Scheme (PALS) at the University of St Andrews School of Medicine was established in 2010 as a student-led academic support initiative. It was designed to help new medical students transition into university life through a structured mentoring system, study skills sessions, and formative academic assessments.

In 2024, the scheme was significantly expanded and under new student leadership. This expansion included the introduction of new academic resources such as curriculum-specific practice question booklets, interactive anatomy games, charity events, and peer-led clinical case workshops. The scheme also launched the PALS Career Lecture Series and created a Partner School Information Booklet, offering detailed student-written insights into each of the School’s partner institutions.

Its efforts to improve the student experience were recognised across the University: the PALS committee was selected as a finalist for the 2024 Enterprising Mind of the Year (EMOY) Award, presented in collaboration with the University of St Andrews Students’ Association and the Proctor’s Office. The team delivered a presentation at the EMOY Finale Event in March 2024, showcasing the scheme’s expanded scope.

In January 2024, PALS also featured at the CELPiE Learning and Teaching Conference, where the President presented alongside academic staff on innovations in student-led knowledge workshops and formative assessment in the undergraduate medical curriculum. These efforts highlighted the growing role of peer-led initiatives in enhancing both academic outcomes and community engagement within the School.

In 2025, the expansion of the scheme was formally recognised by both the University and the Students’ Association. The 2024/2025 PALS President, Sushmhitah Sandanatavan, received the Proctor’s Award - an annual accolade recognising a student who has worked in partnership with the University to enhance learning and teaching at St Andrews. This marked not only a milestone for the scheme, but also the beginning of a lasting legacy of student-led academic support within the School. This follows the 2019/2020 School of Medicine President, Nathan Titterton, also receiving the Proctor’s Award for his contributions to the School of Medicine; he was also part of the Peer Assisted Learning Scheme.

=== Surgical Society ===
In 2009, a small group of students set up the university's first surgical interest society. Since then, a multitude of lectures, skills workshops and anatomy revision tutorials have been run by the society and it continues to grow in size. The Robert Walmsley Lecture was created in 2011 as a yearly event held in the old Bute Buildings to commemorate this previous setting of the teaching of medicine in St Andrews; the inaugural lecture was delivered by David Sinclair.

== Research areas ==
Research at the school is grouped into four main areas:

- Cellular medicine
- Education
- Infection and global health
- Population and behavioural science

== Research Institutes ==
- WHO Collaborating Centre for International Child & Adolescent Health Policy
- Child and Adolescent Health Research Unit (CAHRU)
- Scottish Healthcare Associated Infection Prevention Institute

== Academic dress ==
St Andrews undergraduate medical students are members of the United College of St Salvator and St Leonard, and as such wear the scarlet gown with burgundy velvet collar for official academic occasions. They graduate as a BSc or BSc (Hons) and so wear a black gown with a fuchsia hood trimmed with white fur. On graduation from Manchester they are entitled to wear a black gown with scarlet hood trimmed with white fur, and black cap.

When postgraduate students graduate with the MD degree, they wear a black gown with a crimson hood with a white lining, alternatively they may wear a crimson gown.

== Alumni ==
Medical students at the University of St Andrews have included: smallpox vaccine pioneer Edward Jenner, pro-revolutionary French journalist Jean-Paul Marat, and inventor of beta blockers and H2 receptor antagonists and Nobel Prize in Medicine winner Sir James Black.

== Faculty ==
List includes faculty who were not also graduates of the medical school

Name	Department	Notability	Reference
William Scheves	Archdeacon and Royal Cleric	Scottish physician, Physician to James III of Scotland	
John Reid	Chandos Chair of Medicine and Anatomy 1841-1849, FRCP 1836	Scottish physician, described the function of the glossopharyngeal nerve and vagus nerve. He also proved the heart had a double innervation through the vagus and sympathetic nerves	
Percy Theodore Herring	Chandos Chair of Medicine and Anatomy 1908-1948, FRSE 1916	Scottish physician, discovered herring bodies	
Richard G. Morris	Lecturer 1977-1986, FRS 1997, CBE 2007	British neuroscientist, developed the Morris water navigation task	

== The Bute Chair ==
The Bute Chair was established by John Crichton-Stuart, 3rd Marquess of Bute in 1898.

Holders of the Bute Chair are known as Bute Professors and include:

- 1901–1914 James Musgrove
- 1914–1942 David Waterston (died in office)
- Inter Regnum due to war
- 1946–1973 Robert Walmsley
- 1973–1996 David Brynmor Thomas
- 2003–2014 Robert Hugh MacDougall
- 2014-2025 David Crossman
- 2025-Present Deborah Williamson

== Sir James Black Chair of Medicine ==
In 2010 the Bute Medical School of the University of St Andrews, where Black had studied his initial degree in medicine, unveiled that an honorary 'Sir James Black Chair of Medicine' would be created. This post remained unfilled for the remainder of the academic year 2009–2010. In September 2010 the first Chair of Medicine at the ancient University was given to Professor Stephen H Gillespie MD, DSc, FRCP (Edin), FRC Path, leaving his post as Professor of Medical Microbiology at UCL.

== The John Reid Chair of Pathology ==
In 2012 the Bute Medical School of the University of St Andrews, appointed Prof. David Harrison to the John Reid Chair of Pathology, leaving his previous post as the Head of Division of Pathology in the University of Edinburgh. He remains an Honorary Consultant Pathologist in Lothian University Hospitals Division and Director of the Breakthrough Research Unit, Edinburgh.

== Ann Gloag Chair of Global Health Implementation ==
The current holder of this chair appointed in 2013 is Prof. Will Stones

== See also ==
- Chandos Chair of Medicine and Anatomy
