= University of Exeter Medical School =

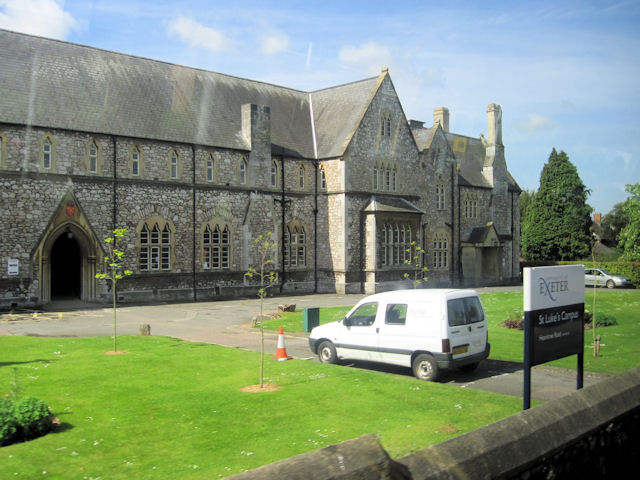
- Type: Medical school
- Established: 2000 (Peninsula College of Medicine and Dentistry); 2013 (University of Exeter Medical School)
- Affiliations: University of Exeter
- Dean: Richard Holland
- Location: Exeter, Devon, United Kingdom; 50.7223°N 3.5163°W
- Qualification: Bachelor of Medicine, Bachelor of Surgery (BMBS)
- Website: medicine.exeter.ac.uk

University of Exeter Medical School is the medical school of the University of Exeter in England. It is based at the St Luke's Campus and offers a five-year course leading to the award of the Bachelor of Medicine, Bachelor of Surgery (BMBS) degree.

== History ==
The school was formed in 2013 as a successor to the Peninsula College of Medicine and Dentistry (PCMD). Before 2013, the BMBS degree was delivered through PCMD in conjunction with Plymouth University. In July 2018, the University of Exeter Medical School had its first cohort of graduates.

== Course structure ==
The BMBS course is delivered across the Peninsula:

- St Luke's Campus, University of Exeter
- Royal Devon University Hospital
- Royal Cornwall Hospital, Truro
- Torbay Hospital, Torquay
