= Student selected component =

Undergraduate medical syllabus elements

Student selected components (SSCs; formerly known as special study modules or SSMs) are optional elements within the undergraduate medical syllabus in UK medical schools, introduced following the recommendations of the 2002 report, "Tomorrow's Doctors", by the General Medical Council (GMC) that the syllabus should include student choice. In 2003, the GMC required that between 25% and 33% of curricular time be available for SSCs. However in the 2009 edition of Tomorrow's Doctors this requirement was reduced to a minimum of 10 percent.
