= Peninsula College of Medicine and Dentistry =

Former medical school in Devon, UK

- Type: Medical and Dental school
- Active: 2000–2018
- Affiliations: University of Exeter; University of Plymouth; NHS South West
- Dean: Professor Robert Sneyd
- Administrative staff: 400+
- Students: 1,500+
- Undergraduates: 1,149
- Location: Exeter & Plymouth, England
- Successor institutions: University of Exeter Medical School, Plymouth University Peninsula Schools of Medicine and Dentistry
- Website: www.plymouth.ac.uk/schools/peninsula-medical-school

Peninsula College of Medicine and Dentistry (PCMD) was a medical and dental school in England, run in partnership with the University of Exeter, the University of Plymouth and the NHS in Devon and Cornwall. In January 2013 the school began disaggregation to form Plymouth University Peninsula Schools of Medicine and Dentistry and the University of Exeter Medical School.

The school had campuses at the University of Plymouth, the University of Exeter, the John Bull Building (Derriford Hospital and Plymouth Science Park), the Royal Devon and Exeter Hospital and the Royal Cornwall Hospital. Teaching of medical students also took place at North Devon District Hospital in Barnstaple, South Devon Healthcare Trust in Torbay and General Practices across the region plus a number of community orientated healthcare settings.

== Peninsula Medical School ==
Peninsula Medical School Logo

=== History ===
The Peninsula Medical School was established on 1 August 2000, preceding the dental school by six years, following a successful bid to the Government, as part of a national expansion of medical student numbers in the UK. The bid was creatively led by Professor Sir John Tooke, who was then working in a joint appointment between the University of Exeter and the Royal Devon and Exeter Hospital. Professor Tooke was subsequently appointed as the school's first dean, a post he held until autumn 2009; his vision and drive have been recognised nationally by his appointment as chair of the UK Committee of Heads of Medical Schools, and by the award of a Knighthood in the New Year Honours list for 2007. The school was opened as a part of the British Government's attempts to train more doctors, which also saw Brighton and Sussex Medical School, University of East Anglia Medical School, Hull York Medical School and Keele University Medical School open their doors. According to the league tables in the media, PCMD has not only consistently outperformed the other 'new' institutions, but has proven highly competitive against established medical schools.

In 2012 the two founding universities of Peninsula Medical School controversially outlined their plans to expand independently and grow the success of the now nationally recognised professional health education provider. With an equitable split of total student numbers, the University of Exeter created the 'University of Exeter Medical School' (UEMS), while Plymouth University created the 'Plymouth University Peninsula Schools of Medicine and Dentistry' (PUPSMD). The inaugural Deans of the new Exeter and Plymouth medical schools were Professor Steve Thornton and Professor Rob Sneyd respectively.

Students who had already started their studies at Peninsula Medical School continued as such and graduated with joint degrees of the two universities, as every previous graduate had. Students entering either UEMS or PUPSMD study for independent University of Exeter or Plymouth University degrees.

=== Undergraduate Degree Programme ===
The first intake of 130 undergraduate students commenced their studies on 30 September 2002. From September 2003, the annual intake rose to 167. In January 2006 Peninsula Medical School was awarded funding for a further expansion, and the UK and overseas places increased. The School's intake rose to 214 from September 2006 and 230 from September 2010.

=== Undergraduate Programme Structure ===
For the first two years of the undergraduate programme students were based at either the University of Exeter or the University of Plymouth. The learning emphasis is placed upon biomedical sciences, taught within the context of relevant clinical problems. From the first week of the programme students learn in various community-based clinical environments.

In years three and four, students spent the majority of their time in acute and community-based clinical placements that were based at one of the School's three main localities in Exeter, Truro or Plymouth. In the original vision for the Peninsula Medical School, an innovative medical humanities focus was established that included a Special Studies unit in which a wine expert and a perfumer developed students' sensory awareness.

During year five students were attached to clinical apprenticeships with general practitioners and consultants throughout Devon and Cornwall.

=== Research ===
Research within the college focused on four main themes; Diabetes, Cardiovascular Risk and Ageing, Neuroscience (embracing both neurology and mental health), Health Services Research and Environment and Human Health.

In the 2008 Research Assessment Exercise (RAE) Peninsula Medical School submitted in two Units of Assessment: "Other Hospital Based Clinical Subjects" and "Health Services Research". In "Other Hospital Based Clinical Subjects", 65% of their submission was judged to be of international or world class quality. This ranked Peninsula Medical School's research 11th of 27 submissions from other UK Medical Schools. Their research in the "Health Services Research" category was also judged to be of high international standard, with 50% of Peninsula Medical School's submission judged as international or world class, ranking them 13th out of 24 submissions.

== Peninsula Dental School ==
Peninsula Dental School Logo

=== History ===
PDS was established on 26 January 2006 following a successful bid to the Government, as part of a national expansion of dental student numbers in the UK. It is the first dental school to open in the U.K for three decades.

The Peninsula Dental School was a member of the Dental Schools Council. Its inaugural dean was Professor Liz Kay.

=== Bachelor Degree Programme ===
The Peninsula Dental School trained 64 dentists a year and offered a joint Bachelor of Dental Surgery (BDS) degree through the Universities of Exeter and Plymouth. The programme was four years, designed for science graduates or health care professionals.

=== Undergraduate Programme Structure ===
For the first two years of the dental programme students were based mainly at the University of Plymouth. The learning emphasis was placed upon core clinical and communication skills.

== Peninsula Postgraduate Health Institute ==
The Peninsula Postgraduate Health Institute (PPHI) contracted with the NHS in Devon and Cornwall to provide taught programmes and research opportunities in medicine, health and social care, working in collaboration with the NHS. The programmes were provided by the University of Plymouth's Faculty of Health and Social Work and Schools of the University of Exeter. The Peninsula College of Medicine and Dentistry was represented on the Board of PPHI.

== Peninsula Allied Health Collaboration ==
The Peninsula Allied Health Collaboration (PAHC) was a separate collaboration of the two universities, together with the University of St Mark & St John, Plymouth, which contracted with the NHS to provide undergraduate programmes in allied health professions such as nursing, occupational therapy, and radiography. The programmes were provided by the collaborating institutions but students could take modules from more than one institution. The Peninsula College of Medicine and Dentistry was represented on the Board of PAHC.
