= Leicester Medical School =

- Type: Medical school
- Established: 1975
- Parent institution: University of Leicester
- Head: Professor
- Undergraduates: 272 UK/EU students + 18 International
- Location: Leicester, Leicestershire, England; 52.6238°N 1.1245°W
- Website: www.le.ac.uk/sm/le/

Leicester Medical School is a medical school in Leicester, England. It is a part of the University of Leicester. The school was founded in 1975, although between 2000 and 2007 it was part of the joint Leicester-Warwick Medical School. As of 2021, the medical school admits 290 students per year including 18 students from overseas.

== Course ==
Leicester Medical School offers a MBChB degree course in medicine as an undergraduate five-year course. Some students also adopt to take an intercalated BSc Honours Degree, an MA or MSc Degree. Leicester Medical School is the first medical school in the UK to teach e-consultations to students.

== History ==
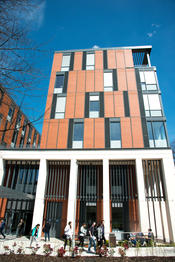
George Davies Centre, the home of Leicester Medical School and also the largest non-residential Passivhaus building in the UK

The school was formed following the recommendations of the Royal Commission on Medical Education (1965–68) (which issued its report, popularly known as the "Todd Report" in 1968). The Commission estimated that by 1994 the UK would need to train more than 4500 doctors a year, and that this would need to be achieved by both increasing the numbers of medical students at existing medical schools, and by establishing a number of new medical schools. It recommended the creation of new medical schools at the Universities of Nottingham, Southampton and Leicester.

In 2000, Leicester Medical School assisted the University of Warwick in the foundation of the Leicester-Warwick Medical School, combining Leicester's own school with a new institution based at the University of Warwick. The project was successful, and in 2007, the two institutions separated, creating Warwick Medical School, and recreating Leicester Medical School.

In 2012, it was announced that Leicester Medical School was to be rebuilt. The £42 million new build began in 2013 and was completed in 2015 to enable the new building’s welcome to its first cohort of medical students in September 2016. Professor Stewart Petersen said that the reason for the rebuild was "We want to attract the best medical students. We’re also acutely aware that students want the best facilities and value for money when being charged £9,000 fees.". On 11 November 2017, the George Davies Centre was officially opened by Sir David Attenborough OM and Michael Attenborough CBE, according to the University of Leicester plaque on the wall of the front lobby.

=== Widening participation ===
Leicester Medical School encourages widening participation with their MedReach programme that reaches out to young people from widening participation backgrounds in the East Midlands to get into Medicine. The Medical School also offers students from widening participation backgrounds who (because of their circumstances) do not have sufficiently high grades to enter medical school. They do this via a Foundation Year. The Foundation Year provides them with the knowledge and skills to enter medical school after a year of additional basic science and communication skills education.

=== Innovations: Longitudinal Empathy Curriculum ===
Medical student empathy often declines throughout medical school. The University of Leicester Medical School has a Centre for Empathic Healthcare who develop and deliver an evidence-based and unique empathy-focused curriculum that runs throughout all five years of medical school. The empathy curriculum is formally assessed and includes advanced, evidence-based communication skills training, getting patients into the lecture theatre during the teaching of pathophysiology, having students "walk a mile" in patients' shoes, and using creative reflection (including narrative medicine and medical humanities).

== Rankings ==
Leicester was ranked 5th in the UK, among 33 medical schools in the 2020 Shanghai Ranking of World Universities. In the same rankings, Leicester was ranked 20th globally. Leicester Medical School is the first UK medical school to adopt a one-iPad-per-student programme at the undergraduate level, commencing in 2013. Leicester Medical School is one of the few UK medical schools offering full-body cadaveric dissection as part of their clinical teaching.

== See also ==
- Medical school in the United Kingdom
