= Brighton and Sussex Medical School =

Medical school in Brighton, East Sussex, England

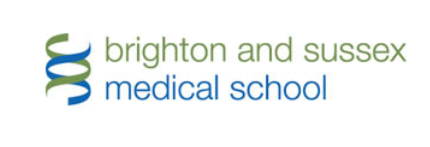
- Type: Medical school
- Established: 2002
- Parent institution: University of Brighton; University of Sussex
- Dean: Richard McManus
- Location: Brighton, East Sussex, England
- Website: www.bsms.ac.uk

Brighton and Sussex Medical School (BSMS) is a medical school formed as a partnership of the University of Brighton and the University of Sussex. Like other UK medical schools it is based on the principles and standards of 'Tomorrow's Doctors', an initiative by the General Medical Council outlining the role of British practitioners. Since opening in 2003, BSMS has produced more than 1,500 new doctors who now work across the UK.

== Introduction ==
The first intake of students began their five-year medical degree programmes in September 2003. The school was opened as a part of the British Government's attempts to train more doctors, which also saw Peninsula Medical School, University of East Anglia Medical School, Hull York Medical School and Keele University Medical School open their doors.

The school is one of a number of new medical schools formed in the UK following the Labour Government's 1997 election victory. Students are technically full members of both universities with access to both sets of facilities. The school gained its licence in 2002, its initial course being a heavily modified version of the University of Southampton course. It admits approximately 136 students per year with all of them being based for the first two years on the split campus at Falmer.

Since then, it has become one of the most popular medical schools in the country. According to UCAS statistics, 2005 saw BSMS as the most competitive medical school to gain a place at. In 2017, the National Student Survey ranked the school as 1st in the UK for student satisfaction.

The school makes use of five libraries: the University of Sussex library, the University of Brighton library, the Sussex Education Centre Library, the Princess Royal Hospital library and the Brighton and Sussex University Hospital NHS trust library.

=== Falmer ===
The University of Sussex is situated in the village of Falmer, near Brighton.

== Teaching ==
The curriculum is a blend of both progressive and traditional teaching methods, based around lectures, practicals and small group based learning mostly taking place on the University of Sussex campus. BSMS does not use Problem Based Learning.

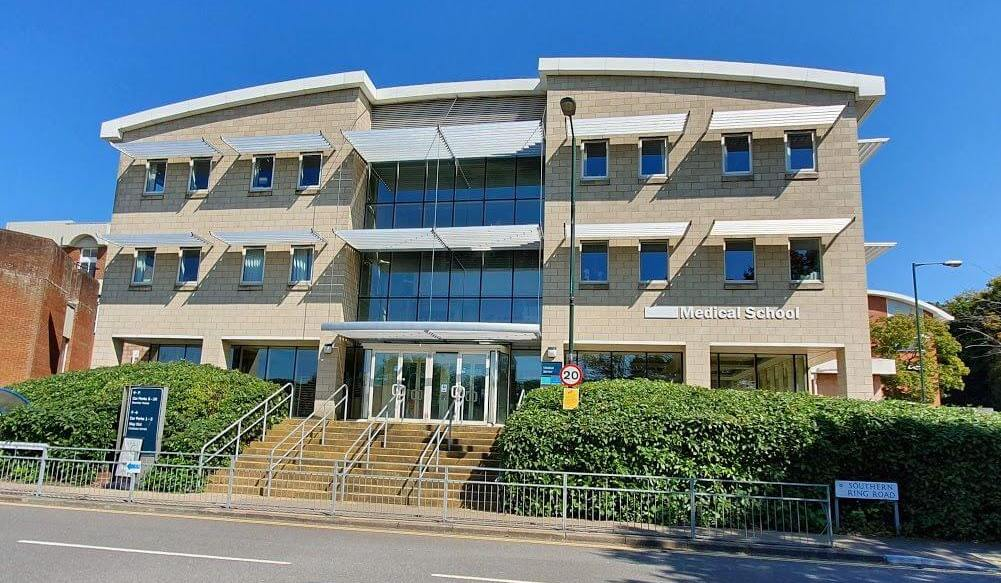
BSMS Teaching building on the University of Sussex campus at Falmer

The University of Brighton provides the professional aspects of the course through its faculties of health, sciences and engineering using experience from other healthcare courses such as nursing and midwifery. In contrast Sussex provides primarily biological science and anatomy teaching for which it is better suited due to the close proximity of the Sussex portion of the medical school to the University of Sussex school of life sciences 'John Maynard Smith' building. Also located close by are the medical research building and the genome damage stability and control centre (an MRC research facility).

The medical school requires dissection of human cadavers as a compulsory part of the course. This means the course is more anatomically based than that of many other modern UK medical schools. As well as the emphasis on anatomy, BSMS also gives early clinical exposure, with students from preclinical years regularly going on placements in both the primary and secondary care sectors.

=== Undergraduate course ===
BSMS offers a Bachelor of Medicine Bachelor of Surgery (BM BS) qualification certified by the GMC. It is a five-year systems-based course with optional intercalated degree year. Having originally had a yearly intake of approximately 120 students, BSMS now admits approximately 200 each year onto the BMBS degree, following the UK Government's required expansion of medical student places in 2017

=== Postgraduate courses ===
BSMS offers a number of full and part-time postgraduate courses, as well as research degrees.

=== The intercalated degree ===
Although BSMS does not offer an accelerated graduate entry programme, subject to performance students may study subjects of their choice in greater depth by taking an intercalated Bachelors or Masters level degree, resulting in an extended 6-year course. This is taken between the third and fourth years of the BM BS programme, and provides the necessary academic background for a career combining medical practice with medical research or teaching. BSMS offers a range of intercalated degrees (at the MSc level) open to its own and external medical students . It is also possible for BSMS students to transfer to another university to undertake an intercalated degree, and then return to complete the medical course at BSMS.

== Teaching hospitals and clinical placements ==
Students will undertake a range of clinical placements, mainly at the Royal Sussex but extending into other trust and primary care settings. The University Hospitals NHS Trust provides a full range of clinical specialties with major centres in cardiology/cardiovascular surgery, cancer, renal dialysis, neurosurgery and HIV medicine. In 2017, there were 12 hospitals affiliated with the school.

The clinical placements are served in general practices and teaching hospitals throughout the south-east, including many in Kent, and all Sussex hospitals, such as the Royal Sussex County Hospital. Medical students have General Practice placements in years 1, 2, 4 and 5 . In early years, the focus is on practising communication skills and on learning in the clinical environment. In later years, the focus becomes clinical skills, managing undifferentiated symptoms, minor illness and chronic disease. In the final year, students carry out student-led surgeries, under GP supervision. In these sessions, students see patients independently and start to draw up management plans.

The Department of Primary care and Public health is very active in research, and there are opportunities for students to get involved in health service and clinical research projects as part of their medical training. There is also an active student GP Society.

=== The Royal Sussex County Hospital ===
This hospital is part of the Brighton and Sussex University Hospitals Trust and provides general hospital services and specialist services, including cancer Services (Sussex Cancer Centre Fund, Cardiac (heart) Surgery, Maternity Services, Renal (kidney) Services, Intensive Care for Adult and Intensive Care for newborn babies. It also houses the new Audrey Emerton Building, a medical education centre and library where 3rd and 4th years are based. It was opened by Baroness Audrey Emerton in 2005.

=== The Brighton General Hospital ===
Brighton General Hospital is the headquarters of Sussex Community NHS Foundation Trust but also hosts some services provided by Brighton and Sussex University Hospitals Trust.

=== The Princess Royal Hospital ===
The Princess Royal Hospital in Haywards Heath, West Sussex, is part of the Brighton and Sussex University Hospitals Trust.

== Regional attachment ==
In Year 5 students undertake clinical attachments in two different regional locations allocated from: Chichester, Eastbourne, Hastings, Haywards Heath, Redhill, Worthing and Brighton. Attachments will be available throughout the range of departments in an acute district general hospital, as well as community placements in mental health and general practice.

== Brighton and Sussex University Hospitals NHS Trust ==
Brighton and Sussex University Hospitals NHS Trust is one of the largest teaching Trusts in the country providing general and specialist acute hospital care for more than a million people.

Services are located on two main sites, the Princess Royal Hospital in Haywards Heath and the Royal Sussex County Hospital in Brighton, which work in partnership with other local community hospitals, GP practices and clinics.

The Trust provides district general hospital services to the local population of some 460,000. It also provides a range of specialist services including cancer services, neurosciences, cardiac surgery, renal services and intensive care for adults, children and newborn babies. The Trust is a very large public sector employer, employing some 5,500 staff with an annual budget of over £300 million. The Trust manages around 1,140 beds and provides the majority of its services from two main sites:

- The Royal Sussex County Hospital campus (including the Sussex Eye Hospital) in Brighton
- The Princess Royal Hospital campus (including the Hurstwood Park Neurological Centre) in Haywards Heath.

== Clinical Investigation and Research Unit ==
The Brighton and Sussex Clinical Investigation and Research Unit (CIRU) offers a range of specialised equipment and resources to carry out clinical investigations, patient-centred research and research training. It is available for use by researchers from the regional health and academic sectors. It is a partnership between Brighton and Sussex Medical School and Brighton and Sussex University Hospitals NHS Trust. The unit opened in September 2006 and has been developed to underpin the development of the medical school and Trust's research strategy.

== Clinical Imaging Sciences Centre ==
The Clinical Imaging Sciences Centre (CISC) is located on the University campus at Falmer. It opened in summer 2007. It houses an integrated Positron Emission Tomography-Computed Tomography (PET-CT) imaging system, a 3T and a 1.5T Magnetic Resonance (MR) scanner. It provides an important resource for the School's research, particularly in neuroscience.

== Institute of Postgraduate Medicine ==
The Institute of Postgraduate Medicine (IPGM) was founded in 2000 with Professor Richard Vincent as the Head of School. In 2006 it became one of the four academic divisions of Brighton and Sussex Medical School. The department contributes to both undergraduate and postgraduate teaching and also to the research output of the School.

With 80 modules up to Masters level, IPGM provides three main programmes of study including:

Clinical Specialties – Cardiology, Diabetes, Nephrology, Trauma & Orthopaedics.

Public Health – Child Health, Epidemiology, Research Methods and Critical Appraisal, Women's Health and Psychiatry.

Institute of Post Graduate Medicine, BSMS runs PG courses in Public Health and Management to meet the needs of doctors and other senior health and environmental colleagues in delivering and managing the public health and/or environmental agenda. Participants gain an understanding of public health and management issues and the various roles of all the professionals involved in both the statutory and non-statutory sectors.

Professional development – Primary Care, Personal Development, Leadership, Medical Education, Quality & Clinical Governance, Evidence-based Practice, and Knowledge & Management.

Staff research projects in the department include the preparation and support of medical teachers involved in inter-professional education; complexity theory in medical education, leadership and management; experience of non-graduates studying Masters courses; and the development of clinical reasoning in medical undergraduates.

== Sports ==
=== Rugby ===
BSMS Men's Rugby has been in place since the University was opened in 2003. The team won the NAMS (National Association for Medical Schools) Plate competition in 2017. Professional rugby player Matt_Worley once visited the team.

=== Hockey ===
The Sussex Healthcare Hockey Club was founded by BSMS students in 2016.

=== Football ===
The BSMS Men's Football Team won the first intramural league, based at the University of Brighton, and finished sixth at the National Association of Medics' Sports tournament in Dublin.

On Wednesday, 22 March 2012 BSMS Men's Football secured the league title with a 7–1 victory over CSL. The win also meant the team had achieved a maximum 10 wins from 10 in the competition. The following weekend the team reached the semi-finals of the National Association of Medics' Sports 2012 tournament in Dundee, Scotland. They were beaten on penalties by eventual winners Newcastle.

The team currently sit in Division 1 of the Mid-Sussex football league.
