= University of Science, Arts and Technology =

Offshore medical school in Monserrat

Coordinates: 16.755°N 62.227°W

- Type: Private, Diploma mill
- Active: 2003–2018
- President: Orien L. Tulp
- Location: Olveston, Montserrat
- Campus: Rural
- Website: www.usat.edu

University of Science, Arts and Technology (USAT) was an offshore private medical school located near Olveston, Montserrat. The university opened in 2003 with administrative headquarters in Colorado, United States, and its pretended main campus located in Montserrat. USAT was described as a diploma mill. It ceased its activities in 2018.

== History ==
The USAT was founded in 2003 by Orien L. Tulp, a retired professor of nutrition, and licensed by the Ministry of Education of Montserrat on the same year. Two years later, it was listed in the World Directory of Medical Schools and began operating. Nevertheless, the medical school of USAT never received accreditation by the Caribbean Accreditation Authority for Education in Medicine and other Health Professions (CAAM-HP) because it failed to demonstrate actual teaching activities in its Montserrat campus.

While USAT was licensed in Montserrat, it appeared that it was actually providing medical education in campuses in Florida and Texas, without authorisation. In 2018, the Educational Commission for Foreign Medical Graduates (ECFMG) in the US took disciplinary action against the medical college of USAT for having "provided false information about of [its] unauthorised campuses". Students graduated from 2003 to 2018 were still eligible to apply for their ECFMG Certification, but those graduating after 2019 are neither eligible to ECFMG certification, nor to United States Medical Licensing Examinations (USMLE).

Similarly, other offices of USAT were created by Tulp in the United Kingdom in 2004 under the name "University of Science, Art & Technology Medical College of London", and in Puerto Rico in 2007. In 2023, USAT alumni sued the USAT for "misrepresenting the legitimacy of its educational program" at a US Court for the District of Puerto Rico, but they failed to demonstrate a “pattern of racketeering activity”.

Following the ECFMG decision, USAT has been considered as "effectively closed" at the end of 2018 and the president of USAT expressed the intention to open a branch in the US Virgin Islands. Nevertheless, USAT has to maintain minimum services for alumni for a minimum of 7 years, and as of 2026 it is still listed as operative.

== Famous alumni ==
- Brian Clement, a nutrition counsellor who offered an $18,000 treatment to a 11-year-old First Nation child affected by acute lymphoblastic leukemia who died soon afterwards.
- Isabell K. Gervais, who used multiple identities in Georgia, Alabama, Arkansas, and Kansas to open and run "medical" and naturopathic clinics over 15 years, and was ultimately arrested in 2015 and convicted to 75 months in jail in 2018 for defrauding vulnerable patients, in addition to indictments for felony, theft, theft by deception, identity theft, wire fraud, and forgery.
- Kristine Blanche, wife of US Attorney General Todd Blanche, member of the advisory council of the US National Center for Complementary and Integrative Health (NCCIH) in 2026, seller of unproven medical treatments, and "holistic" health care provider.
