= University of Dundee School of Medicine =

Coordinates: 56°27′49″N 3°02′28″W

- Type: Medical school
- Established: 1967
- Affiliations: University of Dundee
- Dean: Professor Rory McCrimmon
- Academic staff: ~275
- Undergraduates: 1,009
- Postgraduates: 2,645
- Location: Dundee, Scotland
- Campus: Ninewells Hospital
Colours
- Website: dundee.ac.uk/medicine

The University of Dundee School of Medicine is the school concerned with medical education and clinical research at the University of Dundee in Scotland. In 1967, Dundee's medical school became independent in its own right having started in 1889 as a joint venture between the University of St Andrews and University College Dundee. In 1974, the medical school moved to a large teaching facility based at Ninewells Hospital in the west of Dundee. The School of Medicine now encompasses undergraduate, postgraduate, specialist teaching centres and four research divisions.

== History ==
=== The Conjoint Medical School (1887–1967) ===
In 1881, when University College Dundee was founded, the city of Dundee contained the Royal Infirmary and the Royal Lunatic Asylum which would provide medical teaching space for the new institution. The college however, had no power to award degrees and thus in 1887 proposed a merger with the nearby University of St Andrews.

The Universities (Scotland) Act 1889 paved the way for an affiliation between St Andrews and University College Dundee. During the 1894-95 session, there were nine Professors engaged in teaching fifty matriculated students. Formal Union between St Andrews University and College of Dundee was achieved in 1897.

Buildings for the Dundee Medical School were officially opened in 1904, with the intention of accommodating 100–150 students. The buildings were designed by Dundee-based architect John Murray Robertson before his death in 1901 and were completed by James Findlay and David Smith from 1903 to 1904. On their first visit to the new medical school examiners from the General Medical Council judged it to be "sufficient".

By 1949, the Dundee Royal Infirmary and the Maryfield Hospital were both being used for teaching medical students, but it was already apparent that to expand capacity it would be more economical to build a new facility away from the centre of the city. By 1961, plans were being exhibited for a new building that would allow the medical school to increase to a capacity of 500 students.

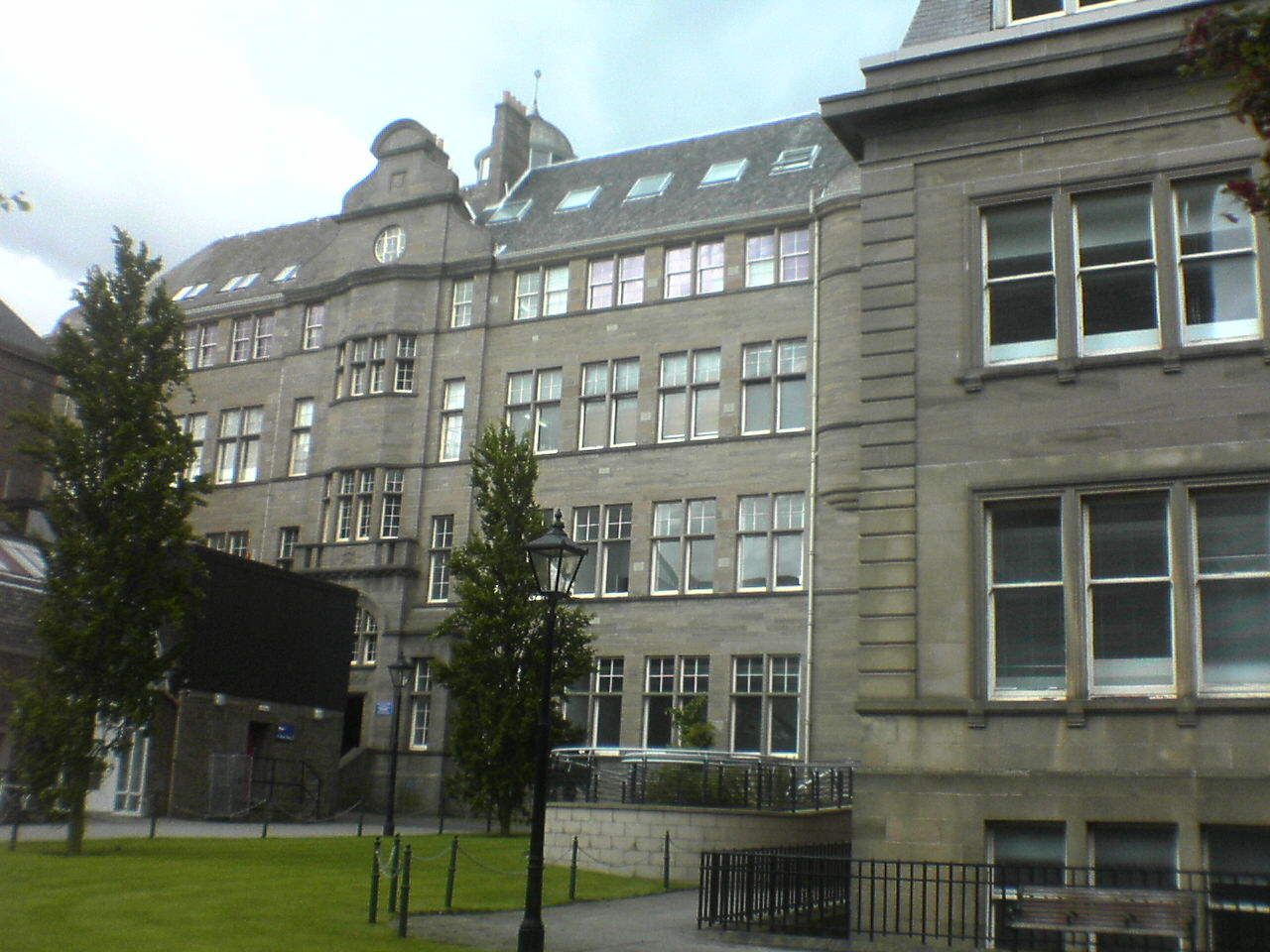
Old Medical School, Dundee

=== The Independent Medical School (1967–present) ===
In 1967, a University Charter was awarded to Queens College, formerly University College, and it became the University of Dundee Medical School, now separate from St Andrews.

Opened in 1974 by the Queen Mother, the Ninewells Hospital & Medical School took over from the Dundee Royal Infirmary as the principal site of medical teaching for the university and eventually led to the closure of the Royal Infirmary in 1998.

In August 2015, the university had a reorganisation into a new academic school structure with nine schools. The medical school had previously been part of the "College of Medicine, Dentistry & Nursing". As well as undergraduate and postgraduate medical courses, the School of Medicine also incorporates skills centres and research units. As of 2015, there are 1,009 undergraduates and 2,645 postgraduate students enrolled at the School of Medicine.

=== Tayside Medical History Museum (1989) ===
The School of Medicine is home to the Tayside Medical History Museum, founded in 1989. The museum's collections include artefacts from medical teaching in Dundee as well as hospitals and general practice across Tayside.

== Recent developments ==
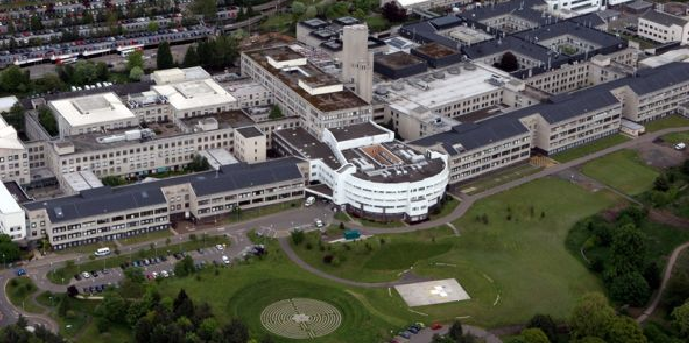
Ninewells Hospital & Medical School

Together with Ninewells Hospital, Perth Royal Infirmary to the west and Stracathro Hospital to the north provide clinical experience and teaching facilities for the university's medical students.

A modern clinical simulation area was opened in November 2011.

In 2011, plans for a glass-fronted extension to the medical school buildings at Ninewells were announced. By 2012, work on the first phase was underway on the site at Ninewells, with the development expected to cost around £11 million. An £8 million upgrade of the Gannochy Trust Lecture Theatre won a commendation from the Dundee Civic Trust.

In April 2015, a reduction of fifteen academic staff posts was announced.

== Research ==
The School of Medicine contains five research divisions with themes influenced by the university's partnership with NHS Tayside:

- Division of Cancer Research
- Division of Molecular & Clinical Medicine
- Division of Neuroscience
- Division of Population Health and Genomics
- Division of Imaging Science and Technology

The Academic Health Science Partnership in Tayside was established jointly by the University of Dundee, the Scottish Government and NHS Tayside with the goal of strengthening the links between academia and the health service. Research at the School of Medicine is the means by which the AHSP's aim to improve clinical care and the education of health professionals is intended to be achieved.

== Reputation ==
Rankings
National rankings
- Complete (2027): 9
- Guardian (2026): 16
- Times / Sunday Times (2026): 3

Global rankings
- QS (2026): 151-200
- THE (2026): 101-125

As of 2019, Dundee is ranked between 101-125th in the world for medicine by Times Higher Education, while Quacquarelli Symonds ranks it 151-200th. On average, over the four years Dundee has been ranked by the Times, it places 92nd, the QS average over seven years puts Dundee at 119th. According to the major 2020 national rankings, medicine at Dundee has the highest academic entry requirements in the UK, at 239 UCAS points.

In 2015, the medical school's Technology and Innovation in Learning team won the Innovation Technology Excellence Award at The Herald's higher education awards.
