= Keele University School of Medicine =

Medical school in England

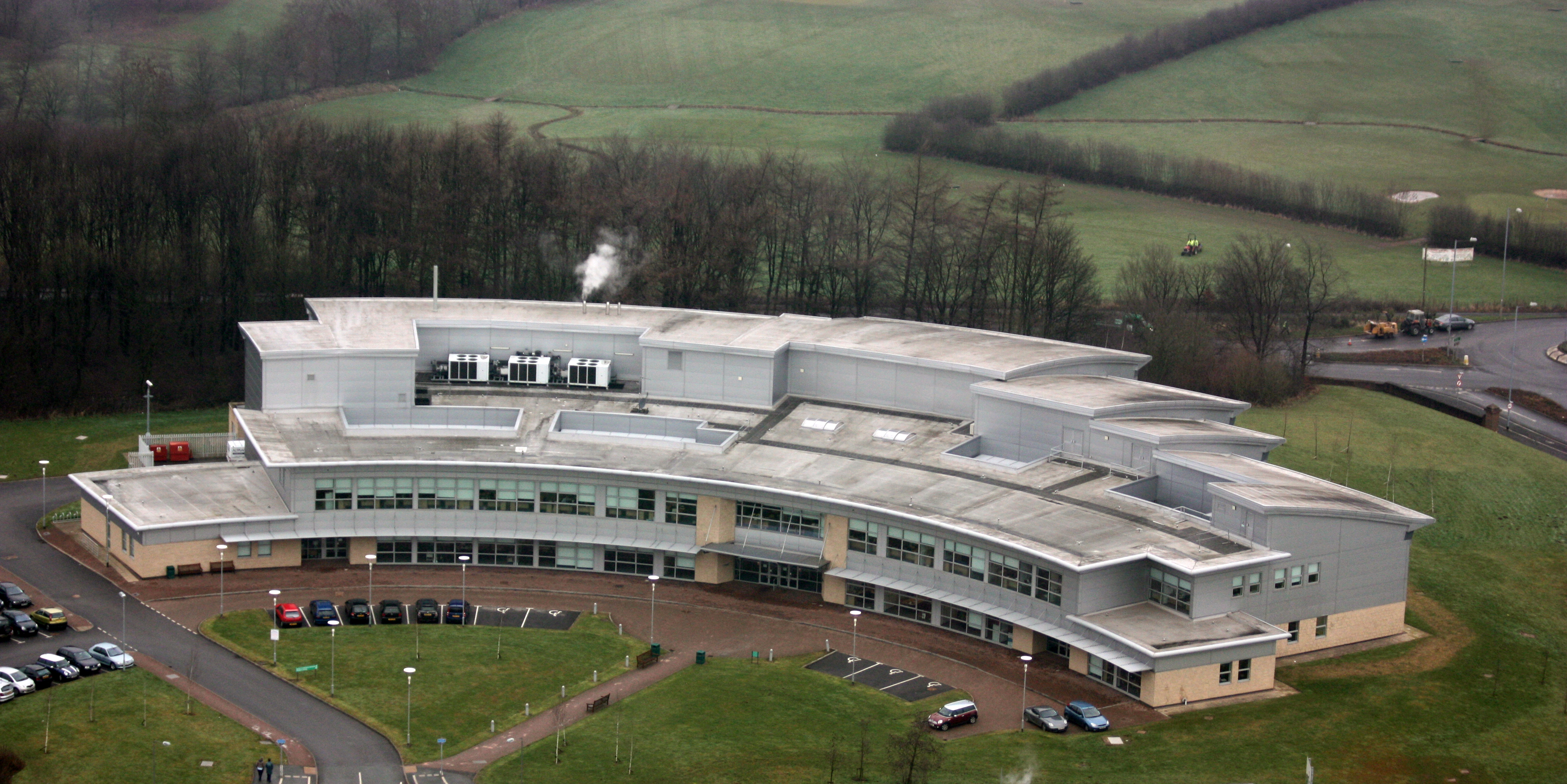
- School of Medicine building named 'The David Weatherall Building' in 2012 in honour of the retiring Keele University Chancellor
- Type: Medical school
- Established: 1978
- Affiliation: Keele University
- Academic affiliation: National Institute for Health and Care Research
- Administrative staff: 80
- Students: c.750
- Location: Keele, Newcastle-under-Lyme and Shrewsbury, England; 53°0′22.9″N 2°15′59.3″W
- Campus: Multiple sites
- Website: www.keele.ac.uk/medicine

Keele University School of Medicine is a medical school located in Newcastle-under-Lyme and Shrewsbury. The first two years of the school's MBChB degree are mostly taught on the Keele University campus, while early contact with patients is critical, and there is significant interaction in a clinical environment from the second year onwards.

As a constituent department of the University of Manchester, the school initially provided undergraduate medical education to clinical medical students who had finished their pre-clinical training at either the Bute Medical School at The University of St Andrew's or the School of Medical Sciences, University of Manchester. Those students were awarded the degrees of MB ChB by the University of Manchester. From 2007, Keele started to develop its own undergraduate medical curriculum and students were awarded a degree from Keele University, rather than MB ChB from Manchester as had been awarded previously.

The third year is primarily taught at the Royal Stoke University Hospital in Stoke-on-Trent and the County Hospital at Stafford (both part of the University Hospitals North Midlands Trust). The fourth and fifth years are also taught at the Royal Shrewsbury Hospital and Shrewsbury and Telford Hospital NHS Trust. Medical students are also placed in General Practice across the counties of Staffordshire, Worcestershire and Shropshire.

The medical school is ranked third in the United Kingdom by The Guardian and The Sunday Times. The school was ranked 4 out of the UK's 33 medical schools in The Sunday Times Good University Guide 2017 with a student satisfaction score of 92.4%. Within the United Kingdom the medical school is ranked second only to Oxford and ahead of Cambridge by The Guardian and The Sunday Times. Globally, the School of Medicine at Keele is ranked 9th by the QS World University Rankings (51–100), placing higher than several American Ivy League universities, including Cornell, Brown and Penn.

The school originally accepted about 120 UK/EU and 10 non-EU medical students each year for the 5-year MBChB course and 10 UK/EU/non-EU students for the 6-year course. From 2011 the total accepted increased to about 150 from all sources. This number may vary depending on NHS requirements and funding.

Within the United Kingdom the medical school is ranked third by The Guardian and The Sunday Times . The school has an excellent reputation and is highly competitive, with an admissions rate of just over 10%.

== History ==
=== Establishment ===
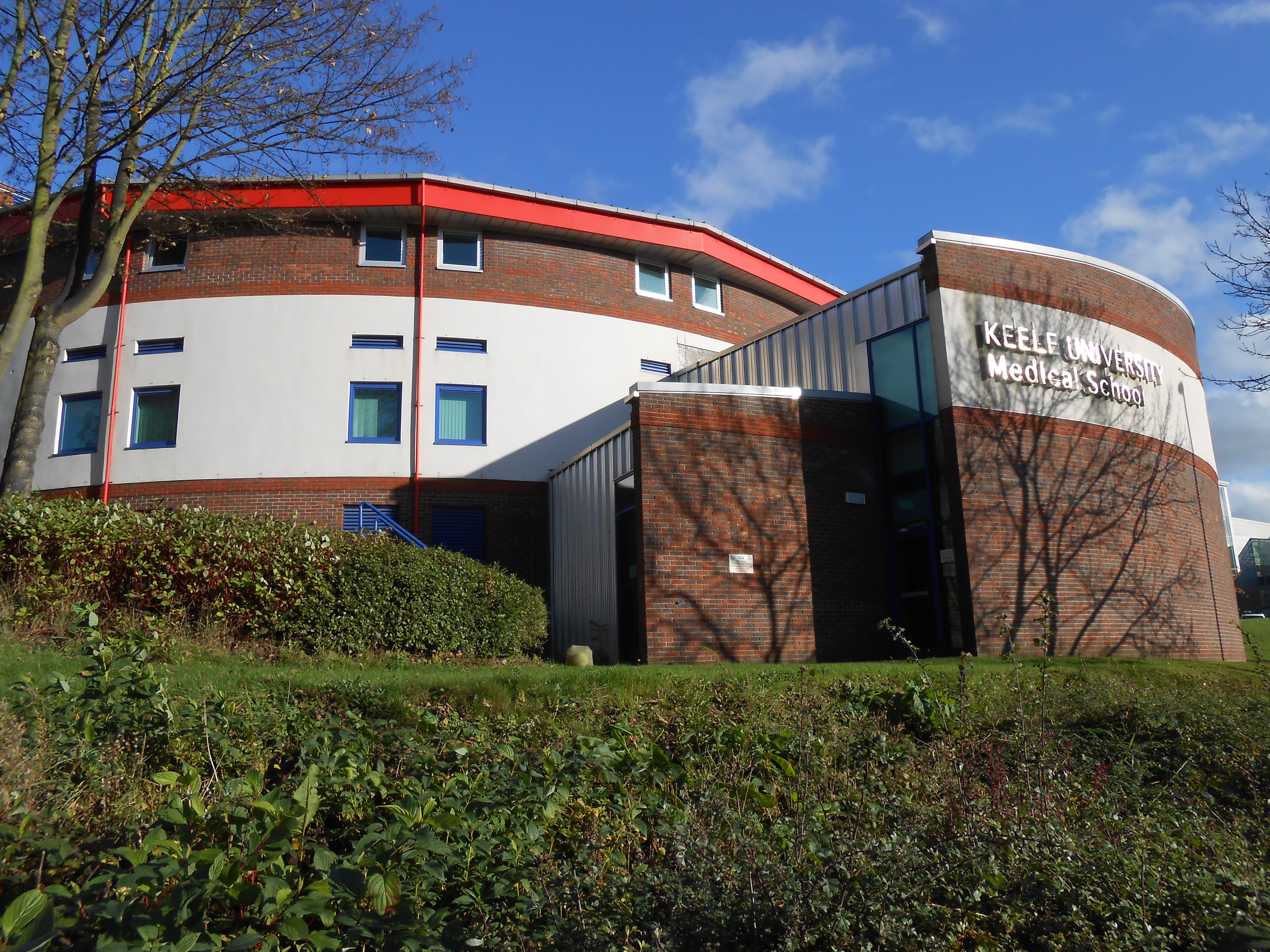
Royal Stoke University Hospital

The Royal Commission on Medical Education (1965–68) issued its report (popularly known as the Todd Report) in 1968 on the state of medical education in the United Kingdom. The commission estimated that by 1994 there would be a need to train more than 4,500 doctors a year for the United Kingdom, and that this would have to be achieved by both increasing the numbers of medical students at existing medical schools, and establishing a number of new ones. It recommended that new medical schools should be immediately established at the universities of Nottingham, Southampton and Leicester.

The Royal Commission considered the possibility of medical schools being established at Keele University, Hull University, Warwick University and Swansea University (then University College, Swansea). North Staffordshire was deemed a very good site as it had a growing local population and several large hospitals. However, 150 students a year would be required to make it economically and educationally viable and thus the scheme was postponed. In 1978, the Keele Department of Postgraduate Medicine opened. This department conducted medical research, and played a part in postgraduate medical education, but did not teach undergraduate medical students. In 2003, 35 years after the publication of the Todd Report, the current medical school was founded.

=== Initial teaching ===
From 2002 the school began teaching clinical undergraduate medicine to clinical medical students who had completed their pre-clinical medical education at either School of Medicine, University of Manchester or the Bute Medical School (University of St Andrews). These students followed the curriculum of the Manchester School of Medicine clinical course, and after three years of clinical study at Keele, were awarded the degrees of MBChB by the University of Manchester. The first cohort of students completing their course at Keele did so in 2005. In 2003, Keele started teaching the full five-year course, using the Manchester curriculum. Both pre-clinical and clinical medical education were established in Staffordshire and Shropshire. Keele began to develop its own undergraduate medical curriculum in 2007.

=== Current teaching ===
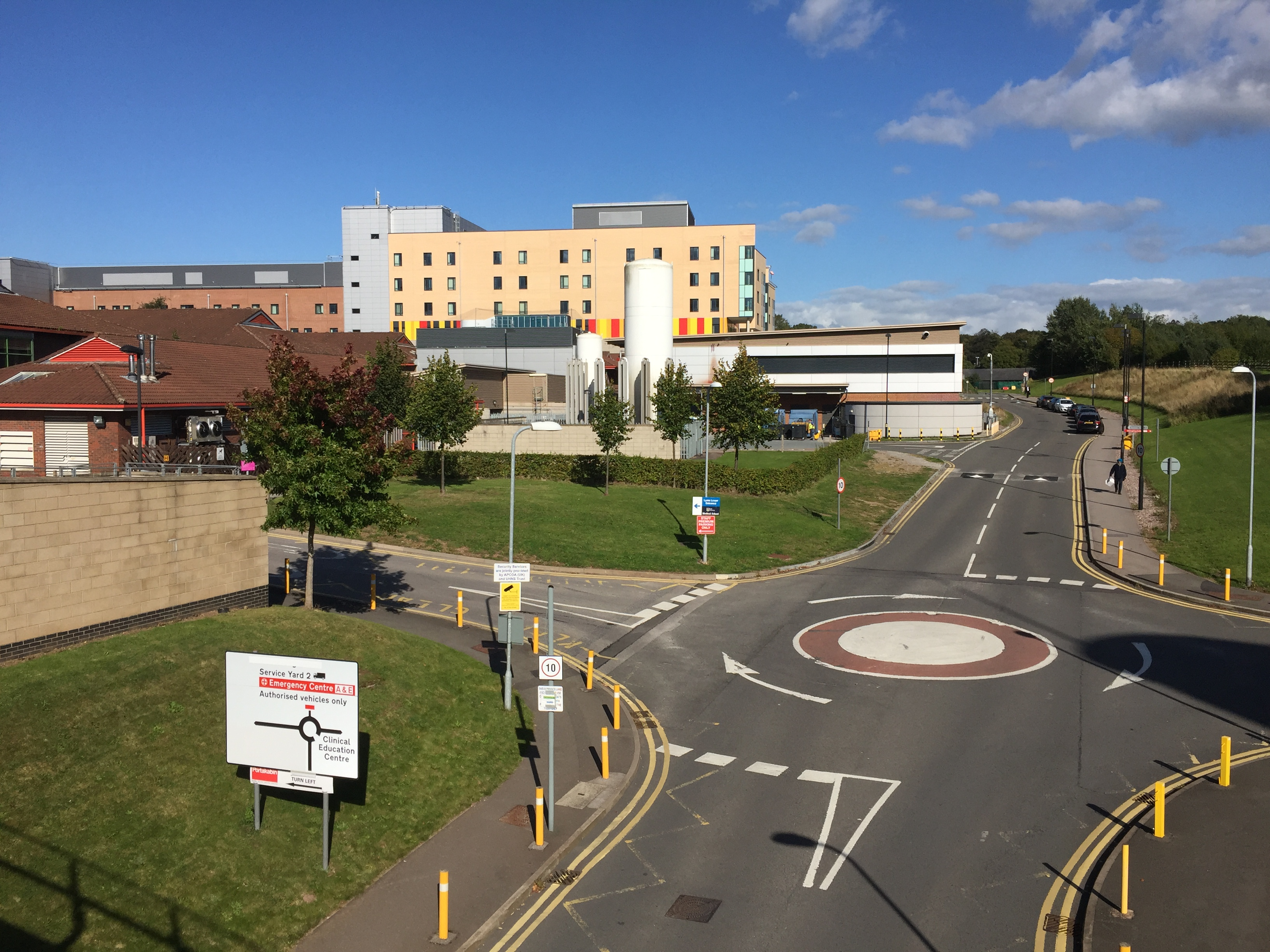
Royal Stoke University Hospital: view over footbridge

From the 2011/12 academic year all students have followed the Keele curriculum. In January 2012 it was announced that the General Medical Council (GMC) had approved and registered the new five-year undergraduate curriculum. Students graduating in 2012 were awarded the Keele MBChB, wearing a new Keele two-colour hood reflecting the fact that students gain two degrees Bachelor of Medicine and Bachelor of Surgery. Previously medical students at Keele have graduated with a Manchester degree. The GMC visited and scrutinised progress throughout the course's development.

Keele's curriculum is integrated, with clinical experience and skills being taught in years one and two, and weekly science teaching in year three. A small number of graduate entry places are available for year two of the course and there is a six-year option for applicants with non-science qualifications. From 2006, applicants have been required to sit the UKCAT admission test. Years 1 and 2 teaching takes place on Keele University campus. Clinical teaching, years 3–5, takes place at the Royal Stoke University Hospital site, in Hartshill. Teaching at Keele also involves attachments at District General hospitals in Stafford, Shrewsbury and Telford, as well as attachments to General Practitioners (GP) in Staffordshire and Shropshire.

=== Online learning ===
Keele Medical School promotes the use of online learning material, such as Keele Basic Bites, which is a free online video-based learning tool for Keele University Medical students, created by senior academic staff.

== Programmes ==
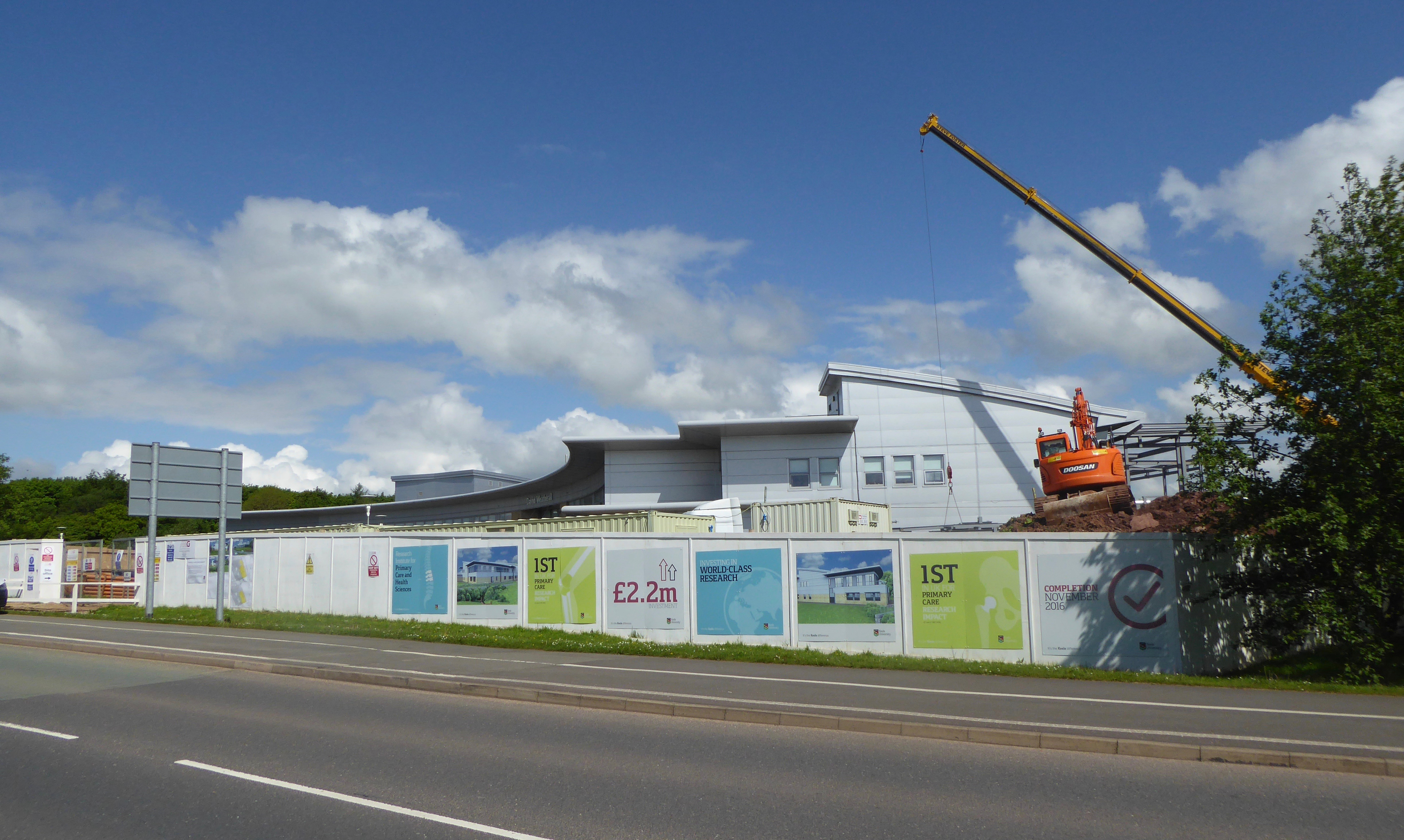
Keele University Medical School Extension

=== Undergraduate ===
- MBChB Medicine
- BSc Medical Humanities
- BSc Natural Sciences with the following named routes:

(i) Neuroscience (ii) Psychology (iii) Biochemistry (iv) Studies in Biomedical Sciences

- MSc Paramedic Science with Integrated Masters

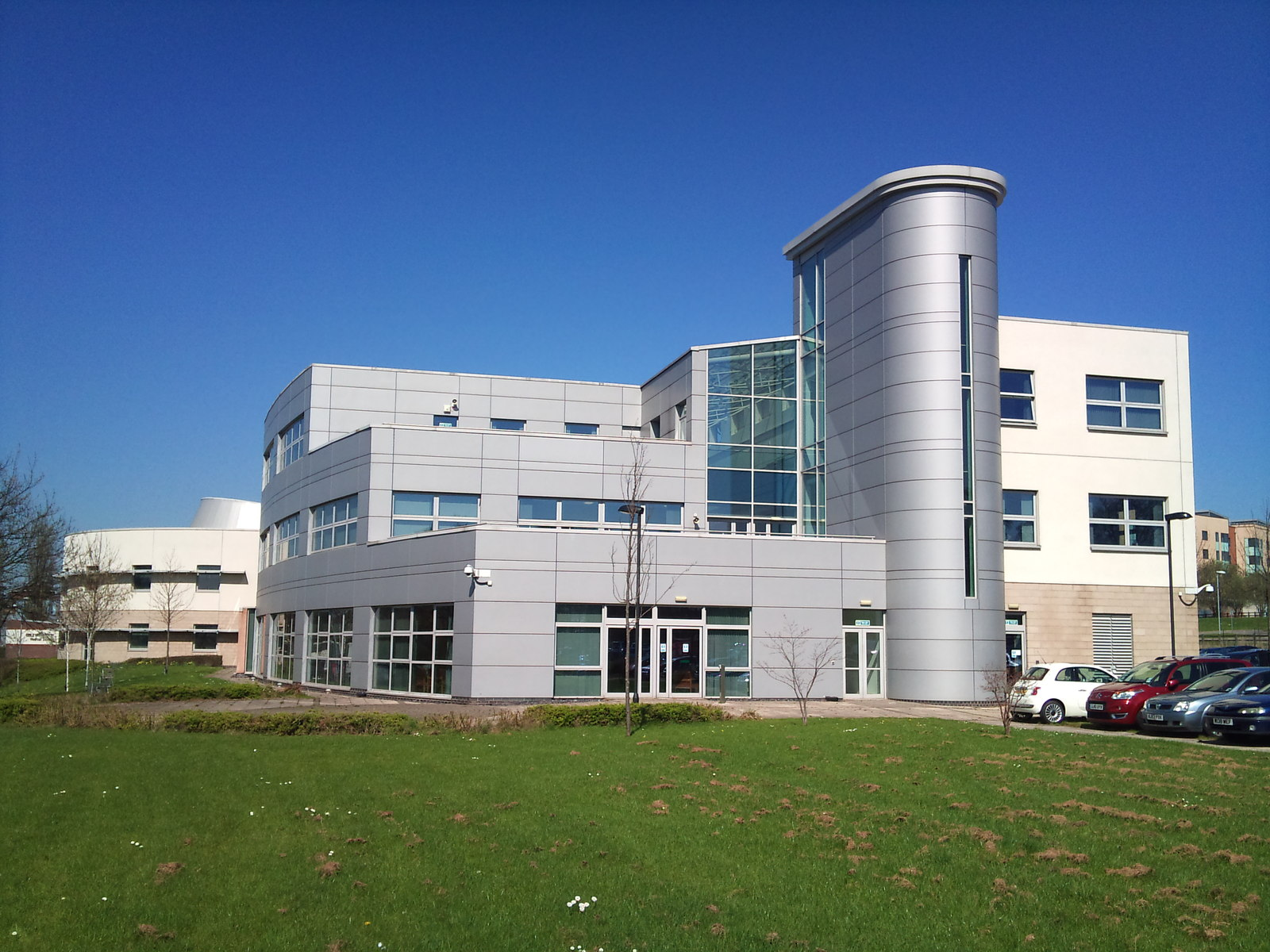
Clinical Education Centre

=== Postgraduate ===
- MSc European Scientific Research Training with international placement
- MMedSci (Anatomical Sciences)
- MA Medical Education
- MSc Molecular Parasitology and Vector Biology
- MSc Biomedical Engineering
- MSc Cell and Tissue Engineering
- MSc Blood Science
- MA Medical Ethics and Law
- MA Medical Ethics and Palliative Care
- MPhil Primary Care Sciences

Other research MPhils are available in clinical and laboratory sciences and this varies from year to year.

== School of Nursing and Midwifery ==
The School of Nursing & Midwifery is located in the Clinical Education Centre (CEC) at the Royal Stoke University Hospital, together with the Health Library, and part of the School of Medicine. At undergraduate level, there is possibility to specialize in Adult Nursing, Children's Nursing, Learning Disability Nursing, Mental Health Nursing and Midwifery.

== Keele Medical Society ==
Keele medical students formed the Keele Medical Society (KMS) in 2005. The organisation aims to represent students and promote social inclusion.

== Current developments ==
In August 2013 a £2.8m Anatomy Skills Facility was completed with the school joining a group of institutions offering facilities to attract surgeons from across the UK. It will also provide improved facilities for students and also offer senior surgeons the chance to improve skills.

A £2.2m extension to the medical school to accommodate the Research Institute for Primary Care Health Sciences (iPCHS) is scheduled for completion in November 2016 An additional £21m medical research facility (including new laboratories) originally scheduled for completion in Stoke-on-Trent will be constructed on the Keele campus instead.

== Rankings ==
=== Medicine ===
Rankings
National rankings
- Complete (2027): 9
- Guardian (2026): 4
- Times / Sunday Times (2026): 4

The school was ranked 4 out of the UK's 33 medical schools in The Sunday Times Good University Guide 2017 with a student satisfaction score of 92.4%. Within the United Kingdom the medical school is ranked second only to Oxford and ahead of Cambridge by The Guardian and The Sunday Times . Globally, the School of Medicine at Keele is ranked 9th by the QS World University Rankings (51–100), placing higher than several American Ivy League universities, including Cornell, Brown and Penn.

Keele was also highly regarded by students, rated in the top 3 medical institutions in the 2014, 2015 and 2016 National Student Surveys.

For 2017 non-graduate entry, the A'level requirement is A*AA at a single sitting including Biology or Chemistry, a second science chosen from either Mathematics, Physics, Biology and Chemistry and a third subject. In 2015, for the traditional 5-year MBChB course, 2202 applications were made by UK/EU students with 285 offers for 119 places.

== See also ==
- Medical education in the United Kingdom
- List of medical schools in the United Kingdom
- Medical school in the United Kingdom
