= List of British Iranians =

This is a list of notable British Iranians.

== Academics ==
- Haleh Afshar OBE – university professor at the University of York
- Kameel Ahmady – independent multi-award-winning social anthropologist who researches and publishes on female genital mutilation, child marriage and other aspects of children's and women's rights in the Middle East
- Ali M. Ansari – university professor at the University of St Andrews
- Reza Banakar – professor of socio-legal studies at the University of Westminster, London
- Ana Diamond – scholar at Balliol College, Oxford
- Abbas Edalat – university professor at Imperial College London
- Anoush Ehteshami – university professor at Durham University
- Eprime Eshag – Keynesian socialist economist
- Rouben Galichian – independent scholar
- Mohammed Ghanbari – university professor at the University of Essex
- Marjan Jahangiri – professor of cardiac surgery at St George’s Hospital, University of London. First woman appointed professor of cardiac surgery in the United Kingdom and in Europe.
- Homa Katouzian – academic, economist, historian and literary critic
- Ali Mobasheri – associate professor and reader at the University of Nottingham
- Mohammad Hashem Pesaran – academic, economist, professor of economics at Cambridge University, fellow of Trinity College, Cambridge
- Reza Shah-Kazemi – Islamic researcher at the Institute of Ismaili Studies with the Department of Academic Research and Publications
- Saeed Vaseghi – university professor at Brunel University
- Taha Yasseri –

== Actors and comedians ==
- Freema Agyeman – actress
- Zahra Ahmadi – actress
- Nathalie Armin – actress
- Moe Bar-El – actor
- Catherine Bell – actress
- Nazanin Boniadi – actress; played Leyla Mir on General Hospital and CIA analyst Fara Sherazi on Homeland season 3
- Bijan Daneshmand – Iranian actor based in London
- Omid Djalili – comedian and actor
- Leila Farzad – actress
- Arty Froushan – actor
- Davood Ghadami – British Iranian actor, known for EastEnders character Kush Kazemi
- Shaheen Jafargholi – Welsh Iranian singer and actor; appeared on Britain's Got Talent
- Mandana Jones – actress
- Hadi Khorsandi – comedian
- Shappi Khorsandi – comedian
- Juliette Motamed – actress and musician
- Arian Nik – actor and writer
- Kayvan Novak – actor; star of Fonejacker
- Roxanne Pallett – actress
- Roxy Shahidi – actress
- Darren Shahlavi – British actor, martial arts stuntman
- Hayley Tamaddon – actress

== Art and architecture ==
- Nasser Golzari – principal at Golzari (NG) Architects
- Mouzhan Majidi – chief executive officer of Foster and Partners
- Mohsen Mostafavi – dean of the Harvard Graduate School of Design
- Farshid Moussavi – architect and founder of Foreign Office Architects
- Afshin Naghouni – artist
- Kour Pour – painter, printmaker
- Alireza Sagharchi – principal at Stanhope Gate Architecture
- Soheila Sokhanvari – Iranian-born multidisciplinary visual artist and painter

== Business ==
- Kaveh Alamouti – head of Global Macro Citadel LLC; chief executive officer of Citadel Asset Management Europe
- David Alliance, Baron Alliance, GBE – chairman of N Brown Group
- Farad Azima – industrialist, inventor and philanthropist
- Camila Batmanghelidjh – founder of failed charity Kids Company
- Darius Guppy – convicted fraudster, writer
- Bobby Hashemi – co-founder of Coffee Republic
- Sahar Hashemi – co-founder of Coffee Republic
- Kia Joorabchian – football businessman
- Nasser David Khalili, KSS – art dealer and the fifth-wealthiest person in the United Kingdom
- Mahmoud Khayami, KSS – industrialist; founder of Iran Khodro
- James Aratoon Malcolm – Iranian-Armenian financier, arms dealer and journalist
- Paris Moayedi – former chief executive officer of Jarvis plc
- Farhad Moshiri – energy investor; part owner of Everton F.C.
- Ali Parsa – former chief executive officer of private healthcare partnership Circle
- Eddy Shah – owner of the Messenger Group
- Yasmina Siadatan – winner of fifth series of The Apprentice
- Amir Taaki – computer programmer and bitcoin developer
- Robert and Vincent Tchenguiz – brothers who own the Rotch property group
- Sir Hossein Yassaie Phd – Chief Executive Office of semiconductor company Imagination Technologies
- Dan Vahdat – co-founder and CTO of Medopad

== Entertainment ==
- Soraya Mafi – opera singer
- Cameron Alborzian – former model
- Cyrus Bayandor – bass guitarist (Florence + the Machine)
- Darius Campbell (formerly Danesh) – actor and singer-songwriter
- Emun Elliott – actor
- Hichkas – rapper, singer-songwriter
- Shirin Guild – fashion designer
- Shusha Guppy – writer and singer
- Shaheen Jafargholi – singer; Britain's Got Talent series 3 contestant
- Yasmin Le Bon – model
- Patrick Monahan – stand-up comedian
- Kayvan Novak – actor; appeared as Waj in the film Four Lions (2010)
- Omid 16B – disc jockey
- Roxanne Tataei – soul singer-songwriter
- Eddy Temple-Morris – XFM disc jockey
- Kavus Torabi – musician
- Yasmin – musician, full name Yasmin Shahmir
- Sami Yusuf – musician
- Zarif – musician

== Media ==
- Hossein Amini – screenwriter and film director
- Behrouz Afagh – head of BBC World Service's Asia Pacific Region
- Christiane Amanpour, CBE – journalist
- Nazenin Ansari – journalist, former correspondent for Voice of America's Persian News Network
- Saeed Kamali Dehghan – staff journalist at The Guardian
- Fardad Farahzad – Journalist and TV host Iran International, former BBC Persian
- Nazaneen Ghaffar – weather presenter at Sky News
- Tina Gharavi – filmmaker and screenwriter
- Kaveh Golestan – photojournalist
- Baqer Moin – BBC News journalist
- Maryam Moshiri – BBC News presenter
- Ramita Navai – journalist
- Nima Nourizadeh – film director
- Sadeq Saba – journalist, head of BBC Persian service
- Sahar Zand – television and radio presenter, broadcast journalist and documentary maker

== Politics ==
- Maryam Eslamdoust, General Secretary of the TSSA
- Seema Kennedy – former Conservative MP
- Ali Milani – Labour Party politician
- Maryam Namazie – human-rights activist, commentator and broadcaster

== Sports ==
- Adam Gemili – sprinter and footballer
- Aadel Kardooni – former Leicester Tigers and England A rugby player
- Nad Narimani – mixed martial artist in the UFC
- Josh Navidi – Cardiff Blues and Welsh international rugby player
- Kamran Panjavi – weightlifter at the 2004 Summer Olympics
- Laurence Shahlaei – strongman
- Kamal Shalorus – professional UFC fighter
- Ryan Tafazolli – footballer
- Mehrdad Takaloo – boxer
- Dennis Walker – footballer of Afro-Iranian descent, first black player to play for Manchester United

== Other ==
- Yasha Asley – youngest person in the world to have achieved grade A at Mathematics A-level
- Ali Dizaei – senior police officer
- Shirazeh Houshiary – Turner Prize-nominated installation artist and sculptor
- Mansour Matloubi – poker player
- Behnaz Mozakka – terrorism victim
- Ben Roberts – poker player

== See also ==
- Iranians in the United Kingdom
- List of Iranians
- List of Iranian Americans
