= The Cheese Grater =

Student publication at University College London

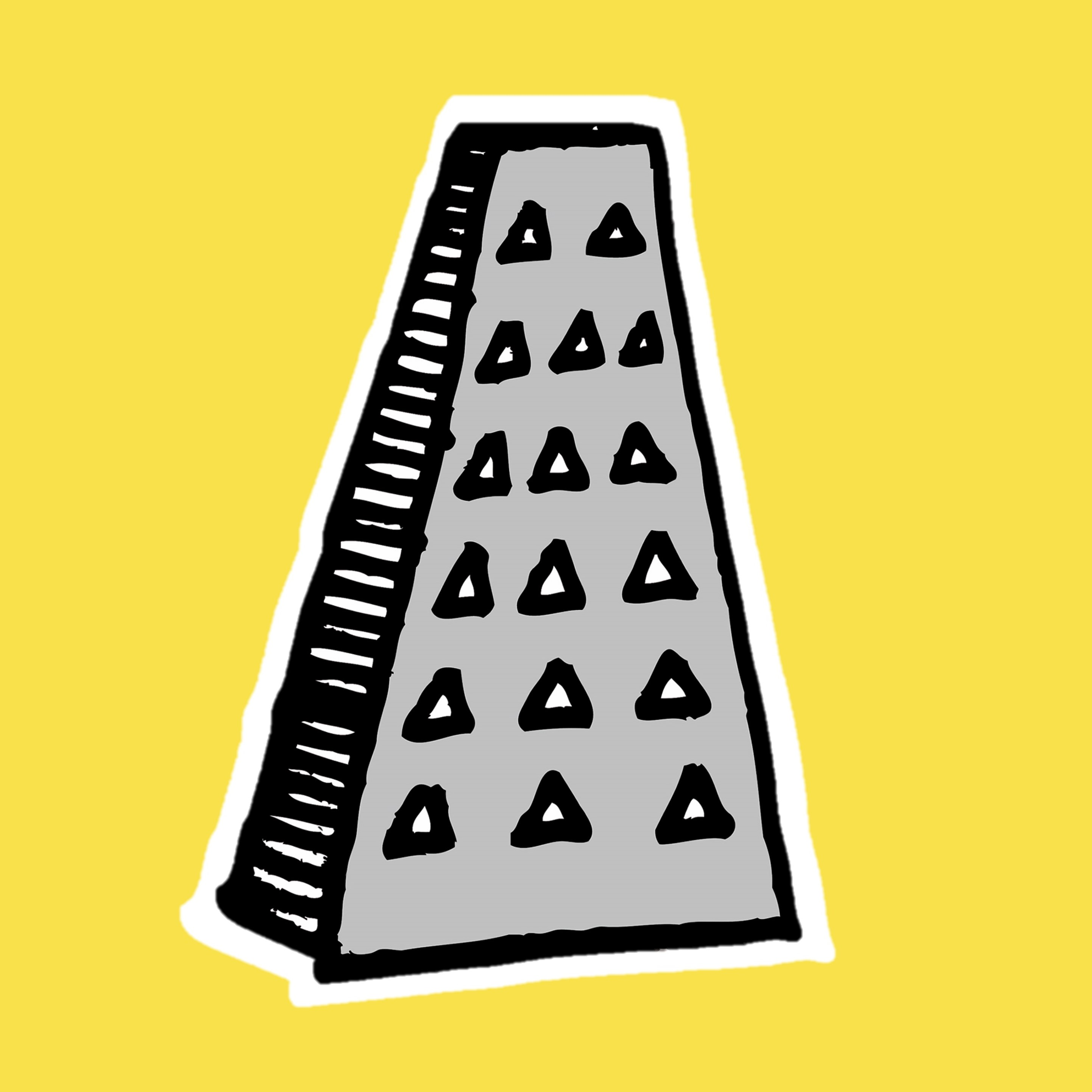
- Format: Magazine, print and online
- School: University College London
- Publisher: Students' Union UCL
- President: Kotryna Taujanskaite
- Editor-in-chief: James Balloqui and Go Kitajima
- Founded: February 2004
- Political alignment: Progressive
- City: London
- Sister newspapers: Women's Wrongs
- Website: cheesegratermagazine.org
- Free online archives: cheesegratermagazine.org/past-issues/

The Cheese Grater is an investigative and satirical student publication at University College London. It is published by Students' Union UCL through the Cheese Grater Magazine Society, an affiliated student society that also operates the sketch comedy group UCL Graters, and feminist zine Women's Wrongs.

The Cheese Grater reports on campus news and student politics, and publishes satire that is often critical of the university and the students' union. It prints at least three times a year, with free copies distributed across campus. Since 2024, it also publishes a biweekly newsletter, hosts a weekly segment on Rare FM, and breaks news stories online during term time.

Despite being founded as an alternative to the historically mainstream Pi Magazine, The Cheese Grater has become UCL's largest publication both by readership and online following. The Cheese Grater has won 'Publication of the Year' at Students' Union UCL's annual Arts Awards 10 times since 2004, and was twice named 'Best Publication in London' by the Student Publication Association in 2022 and 2025. In 2026, it won "Best Publication" at the national Student Publication Association National Conference, becoming the only magazine to ever win the award, widely considered the most prestigious in UK and Irish student journalism.

== History ==
In 2024, almost every past edition of The Cheese Grater was digitised and added to the UCL Special Collections as part of archiving efforts by then editor Robert Delaney, accessible digitally via the UCL Library website and The Cheese Grater's website archive.

=== 2004 to 2010 ===
Issue 9 of The Cheese Grater, March 2005.

The Cheese Grater was founded by classics student René Lavanchy, an Ifor Evans Hall resident and a critical observer of Pi Magazine – the only significant UCL student publication at the time. Disillusioned and seeking to offer an alternative, Lavanchy affiliated the Cheese Grater Magazine Society with UCL Union on 12 February 2004 alongside his then flatmate and inaugural treasurer Nick Cowen.

Early Cheese Grater editions were largely in the style and tone of Private Eye, a practice that continues in some form today. The first issue, published 25 March 2004, was a poorly photocopied satirical pamphlet, which had an empty page on the back cover and an advert within calling for more writers to get involved. The next issue followed in October 2004, and included 12 pages of satirical and investigatory pieces.

Since then, The Cheese Grater has published between three to five print issues every academic year. In Issue 4, February 2005, it published a special report accusing UCL Union sabbatical officer David Renton of laziness, incompetence, and general neglect of his duties.

In Issue 9, March 2006, The Cheese Grater revealed – using the evidence of a leaked e-mail – that then student editor of Pi Magazine Simon Dedman had cheated in recent UCL Union elections, securing the election of Nick Barnard as Media and Communications Officer, and that neither person had been significantly disciplined for it.

The Cheese Grater won its first awards in 2006, when it was named 'Best Small Budget Publication' at the Guardian Student Media Awards and UCL Union's 'Publication of the Year' – a title it will win for the next seven consecutive years. Lavanchy remained at The Cheese Grater as an advisor to new editors until 2010 despite graduating four years prior.

=== 2011 to 2020 ===
In Issue 29, February 2011, The Cheese Grater published documents from UCL Academic Board meetings which revealed the potential impact of government higher education cuts at UCL. The findings suggested a £35 million budget shortfall for UCL even if it were to charge the full £9,000 undergraduate tuition fee.

Following the publication of this article, the documents revealing this were removed from the UCL website. The story was later picked up by Times Higher Education, which ran a piece using these findings on 24 February 2011.

In Issue 34, March 2012, The Cheese Grater investigated UCL's bid to build a second London campus in Stratford – now UCL East – uncovering local residents' objections to the potential demolition of their homes, and inadequacies in Newham Council's consultation process. The story was later picked up by The Guardian and other national media.

In 2016, the Cheese Grater Magazine Society launched its sister publication, Grater Expectations, a feminist zine focusing on absurdist humour and art. It rebranded in 2022 as Women's Wrongs under then zine editors Anna Maria Papaoikonomou and Disha Takle. Women's Wrongs was named 'Best Specialist Publication' at the Student Publication Association's 2025 National Awards, and twice claimed 'Publication of the Year' at the Students' Union UCL Arts Awards in 2023 and 2025.

=== Since 2021 ===
In Issue 81, Spring 2022, The Cheese Grater published an investigation into UCL's decision to leave the LGBTQ charity Stonewall. The article was widely received with both praise and criticism after it reached over 60,000 people on social media. It exposed procedural inconsistencies, and lobbying by an established inter-departmental network of gender critical feminists amongst UCL's academic staff.

In Issue 84, Winter 2022, Neil Majithia and Elettra Plati revealed the initiation rituals of UCL's most prolific sports club, bringing TeamUCL's culture of heavy drinking to attention. This story won 'Best News Piece' at the Student Publication Association's 2023 National Awards, and 'Best Media Piece' at the Students' Union UCL's 2023 Arts Awards.

In Issue 87, Summer 2024, an investigation by editor Robert Delaney into the History Department's redundancy process triggered an industrial dispute between the University Colleges Union and UCL, after The Cheese Grater reported that up to a dozen staff members may be made redundant by the end of the academic year.

Also in Issue 87, an article by editor Mads Brown revealing students' experience of transphobia at the Institute of Education prompted a collaboration between the IOE and Cheese Grater editors to create a workshop on trans identity and visibility in the faculty. This story won 'Best Media Piece' at the Students' Union UCL 2024 Arts Awards.

In the same issue, investigations editor Rebekah Wright revealed UCL Provost Michael Spence's role as a trustee of a Christian missionary charity Mercy Ships, which considers homosexuality as "sexual immorality" in its code of conduct, raising questions about the Spence's stance on LGBTQ rights, given his poor record on the issue when acting as President and Provost of UCL.

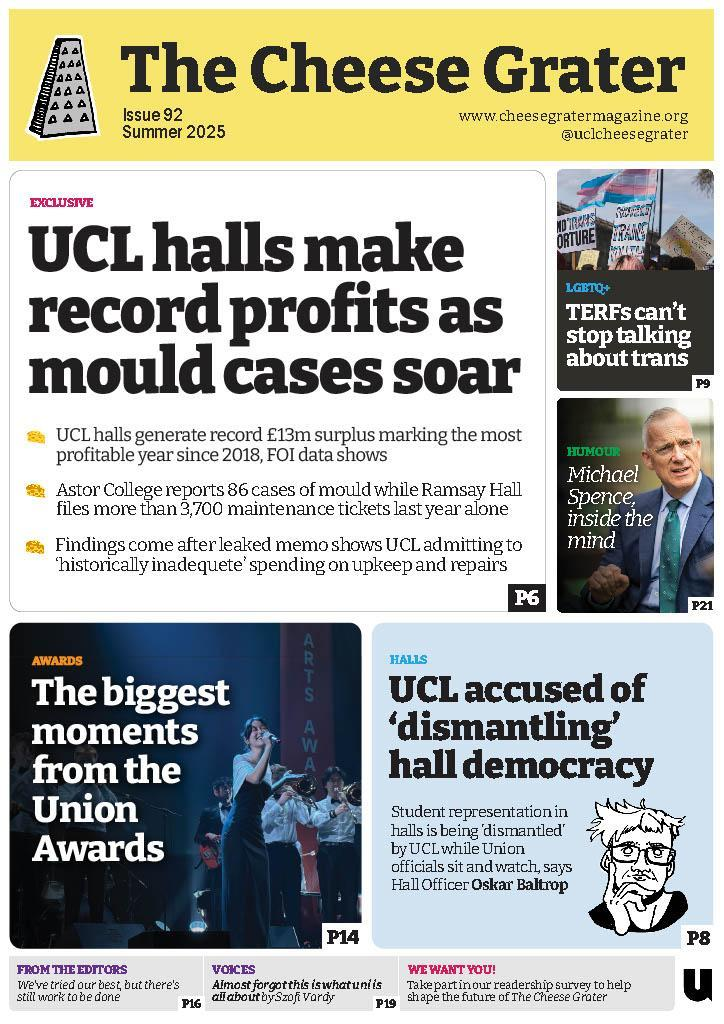
Issue 92 of The Cheese Grater, Summer 2025.

The Cheese Grater began breaking news stories online on a rolling basis since 2024, recognising that UCL was fast becoming a news desert outside of termly Cheese Grater print runs despite boasting a community of 50,000 students. Editors Nick Miao and Robert Delaney placed a renewed commitment to covering campus news and students' union proceedings, in a year which saw the publication of more than 200 articles over five print editions – including two special issues, 90 and 91, respectively the first election special since 2012 and the first ever London Varsity special.

In 2024, The Cheese Grater launched its first email newsletter, The Digestive, sent out every other Monday with the fortnight's campus news, satire, and opinion pieces during term time. Alongside this, it began hosting a weekly talk show on UCL student radio Rare FM, marking the paper's expansion into broadcast journalism.

The Cheese Grater was named "Best Publication" at the Student Publication Association's 2025 London regional awards, the second time it has won the title since 2022.

== Structure ==
The Cheese Grater is produced by student journalists at the Cheese Grater Magazine Society, itself affiliated with Students' Union UCL, which publishes the paper. The Society also operates two other branches: the sketch comedy group Graters, and feminist zine Women's Wrongs. It is financially reliant on membership fees and Union printing grants.

All editors of The Cheese Grater and officers of the Cheese Grater Magazine Society are elected by members via Students' Union UCL. Membership is purchased via the Union's website and is open to any UCL student and associate members.

The Constitution of the Cheese Grater Magazine Society states there shall be three executive officers: president, treasurer, and welfare officer, and 15 additional committee positions, including two editors-in-chief of The Cheese Grater. They are elected every March during the leadership elections.

== UCL Graters ==
Members of the Cheese Grater Magazine Society founded the UCL Graters sketch comedy group in 2011. As the magazine was founded due to dissatisfaction with UCL's student media, so the UCL Graters were created due to dissatisfaction with UCL's student comedy scene. The group's cast changes yearly, tending to focus on darker and more absurd humour than UCL's Comedy Club and the MDs Comedy Revue. The group is run by the society's Show Coordinators, who direct the group in writing and performing their own material at shows in UCL and around London.. As of September 2025, this is Robin Elfsberg and Carla Rodrigues. The Graters were described as "exemplary" by the Wee Review for their 2017 Fringe show.

The Graters have performed at the Edinburgh Fringe Festival since 2011 at various venues, including the Underbelly and Just the Tonic.

=== List of shows ===
- Julian Ignores His Friends And Talks To A Pretty Girl (2012), a sketch show.
- Crab Salad (2013), a sketch show.
- Our Jackie (2014), a comedy play.
- 2015: A Sketch Odyssey (2015), a sketch show starring Ruby Clyde, Luke Reilly and Hûw Steer, produced by Will Orton.
- UCL Graters: Immature Cheddar (2016), a sketch show starring Luke Reilly, Hûw Steer, Sarah King and Sam Pryce, produced by Will Orton and Freddie Lynch.
- UCL Graters: Smashing (2017), a sketch show starring Hûw Steer, Heather Dempsey and Felicity Wareing, produced by Will Orton and Alex Diamond.
- UCL Graters: Panopticon (2018), a thematic sketch show starring Joe Andreyev, Sam Dodgshon, Isobel MacLeod, Luke Shepherd and Felicity Wareing, produced by Alice Fraser-Edwards.
- Post Humour (2021), a play-sketch hybrid set in a surreal British Post Office. Winner of the Derek Spirit of the Fringe award.
