= Richard Friedland =

Chief executive officer of Netcare Group

Richard Friedland is the chief executive officer of the Netcare Group, a healthcare provider in South Africa.

== Early life and career ==
Prior to working at Netcare, Friedland served as the operations director of Medicross. He joined Netcare in early 1997, initially taking on the role of chief operating officer. During his tenure, he played a significant role in the establishment of Netcare UK and served as the CEO of the Netcare International Division from 2002 until August 2005.
