= Steve Melton (businessman) =

British business executive (born 1962)

- Born: January 6, 1962 (age 64); Turkey
- Education: Bedford Modern School and the University of Cambridge
- Occupation: Business executive
- Known for: Former Chief Executive of Circle Health Ltd

Steven Melton (born 6 January 1962) is a British business executive who is CEO of Exemplar Healthcare, former managing director of MyDentist, and the former Chief Executive of Circle Health Ltd, the first private company to take over an NHS Hospital, namely Hinchingbrooke Hospital.

== Early life and education ==
Melton was born in Turkey on 6 January 1962 and educated at Bedford Modern School and the University of Cambridge.

== Career ==
Melton began his working life in the personal care division of Unilever. After 11 years he moved to Asda where he worked alongside Archie Norman at a critical juncture in the life of that company. Melton's peers at Asda included Justin King, Mike Coupe and Richard Baker.

Melton joined Circle Health Ltd in 2008 and became CEO after the departure of Ali Parsa. Being CEO of a private owner of a former NHS Hospital is arguably not without controversy and in an interview with The Sunday Times on 15 February 2015 Melton stated that his ‘job isn’t to be a ‘larger-than-life character. I’m not very fond of the media exposure I have had; it’s not my natural character’.
