= BMI Healthcare =

British private healthcare provider (1970–2022)

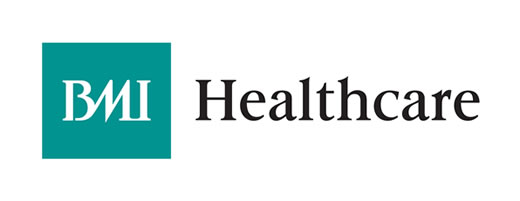
- Company type: Private
- Industry: Healthcare
- Founded: 1970
- Defunct: 2022
- Successor: Circle Health Group
- Headquarters: London, United Kingdom
- Area served: UK and International
- Key people: Karen Prins (Group Chief Executive)
- Revenue: £834.0 million (2012)
- Net income: £106.1 million (2012)
- Owner: Centene
- Number of employees: 9,500
- Website: www.circlehealthgroup.co.uk

BMI Healthcare was an independent provider of private healthcare, offering treatment to private patients, medically insured patients, and NHS patients. As of 2019, it had 54 private hospitals and healthcare facilities across the UK, with headquarters in London. In December 2019, it was acquired by a parent company of Circle Health and was replaced by Circle Health Group in 2022.

== History ==
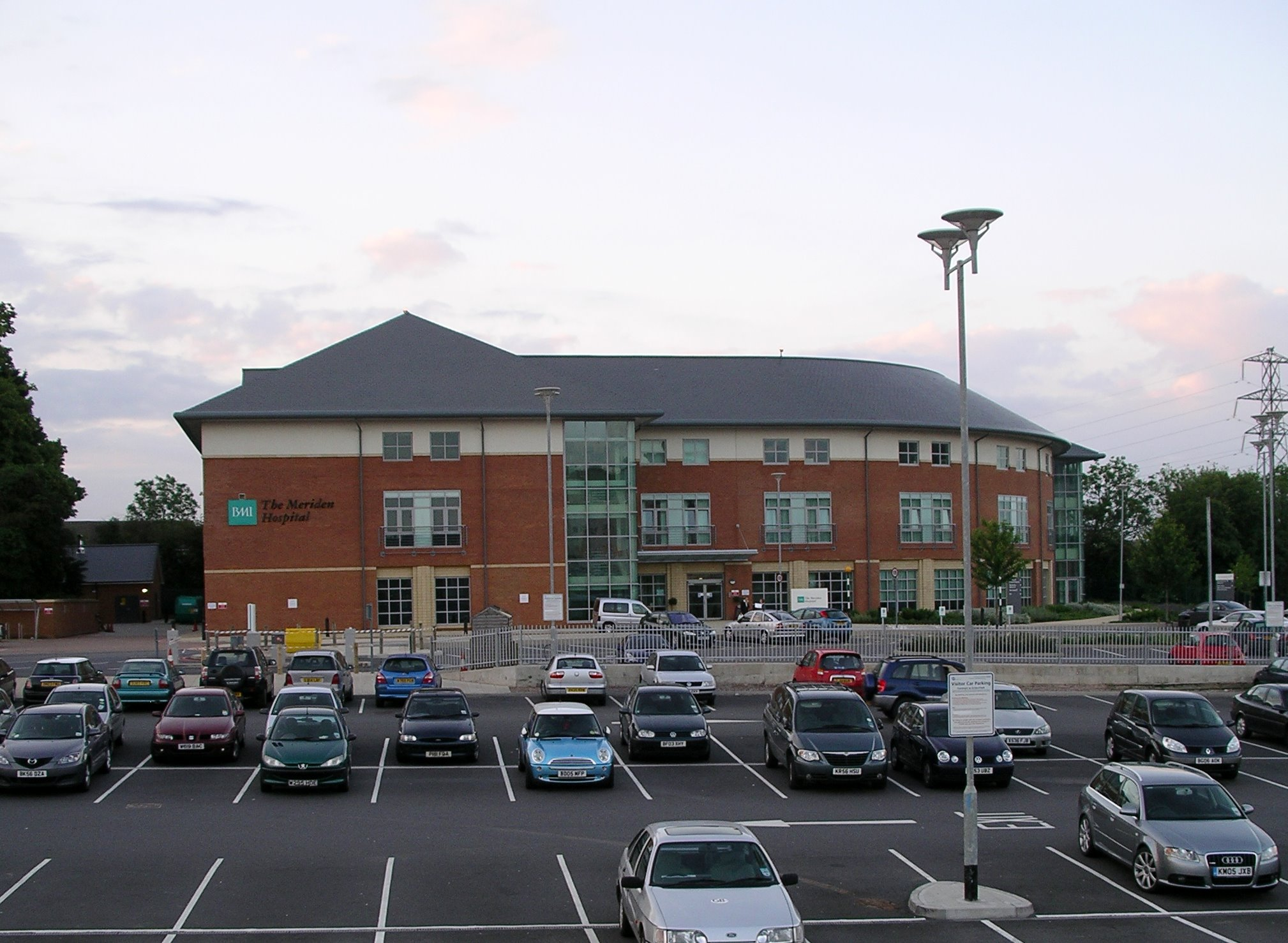
BMI The Meriden Hospital

BMI Healthcare was formed in 1970, when US hospital group AM(E) acquired its first hospital in the UK, the Harley Street Clinic. By 1983, the now AMI group had grown to 13 hospitals and by 1988 had created a psychiatric division, health services division and floated on the London Stock Exchange.

In 1990, AMI was purchased by then Generale des Eaux. AMI was renamed BMI Healthcare in 1993 and its new corporate group named General Healthcare Group. In 1997 funds managed by Cinven acquired GHG. After a further period of expansion GHG merged with Amicus Healthcare group in 1998 and the group grew its portfolio to over 40 hospitals.

In 2000, Cinven sold its investment to funds advised by BC Partners and in 2005 BMI Healthcare's health services, Occupational Health division was sold to the Capita Group. GHG was bought from BC Partners by a consortium led by Netcare (Network Healthcare Holdings Limited), a large South African Healthcare company, in 2006. In April 2018, Netcare announced it was to sell its 57% stake because it had failed to conclude a rent reduction transaction with the largest landlord on 35 of its 59 hospital properties. In October 2018, it was announced that it had agreed a deal with its creditors and landlords, including Hospital Topco, which involved injecting capital of at least £58 million, extending the company's bank facilities to 2024 and reducing annual rent by £65M. This would bring its operations and 35 hospitals back under common ownership.

In 2011, Stephen Collier was appointed chief executive. BMI showed a strong performance in its 2013 financial year, with revenue up by 2.1% (to £851.3M). In October 2017, Karen Prins was appointed chief executive officer. Prins was an appointment from parent company Netcare based in South Africa.

In November 2019, it was reported that Circle Health, a smaller competitor, planned to acquire the company.

== Operations and services ==
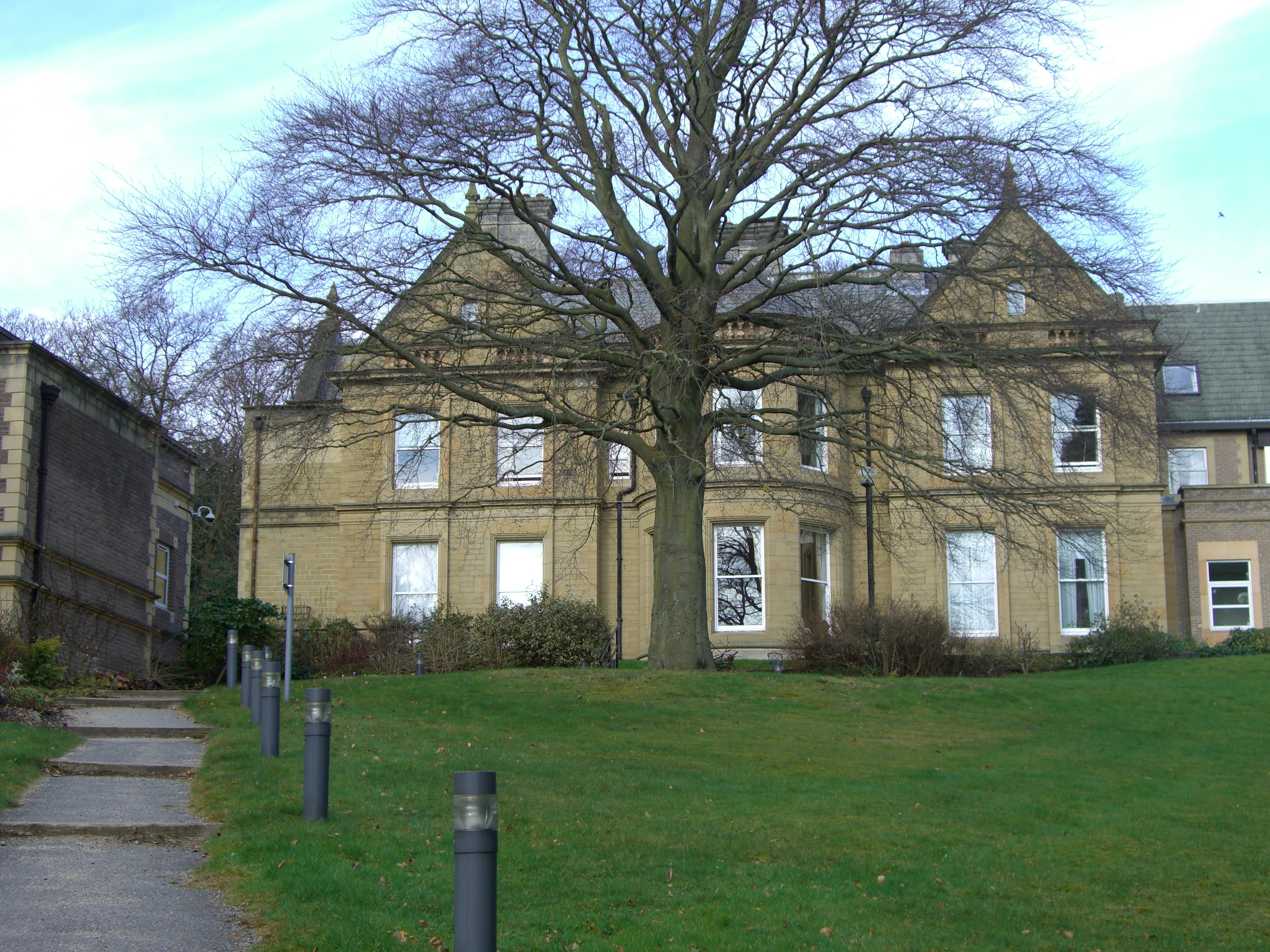
BMI Thornbury Hospital

As a private healthcare provider, the bulk of BMI Healthcare's revenue was generated through the treatment of insured and self-pay patients, with many being surgical in nature. As with other private healthcare providers in 2012/13, recessionary pressures led to declining numbers of private patients, and an increased push towards securing NHS funded business.

It also offered health services to corporate clients, providing health assessments, on-site education days, physiotherapy, GP services, occupational health services and flu clinics to company employees.

In April 2019, the firm closed the Somerfield Hospital in Maidstone. Fernbrae Hospital in Dundee is to close in May 2019.

== NHS contracts ==
In May 2014, Brent clinical commissioning group (CCG)) awarded a £5.8 million ophthalmology contract to BMI Healthcare after a two-year hold up caused by complaints about the CCG's procurement procedure.

The Woodlands Hospital in Darlington was used by South Tees Hospitals NHS Foundation Trust to help with elective surgery capacity problems, usually in the winter. This often involves the same surgeon working on a Sunday. 70% of the hospital's work is NHS funded.

In 2017 around £370M of the firm's income, 42%, came from NHS-funded work.

== International work ==
BMI Healthcare saw increased numbers of international patients in recent years, with most international patients receiving treatment at London-based hospitals. The majority of patients BMI Healthcare treats were government sponsored from the Gulf regions of the Middle East. Insured patients living or travelling in the UK and self-paying patients from abroad made up the remainder of the international market BMI Healthcare treats.

University Hospitals Plymouth NHS Trust had a contract for cardiac surgery performed by the trust's own surgeons at the London Independent Hospital. This was mainly valve replacements and coronary artery bypass grafts. Patients usually spent 5–8 days in hospital and are admitted the night before to take account of travelling.

== Corporate affairs and culture ==
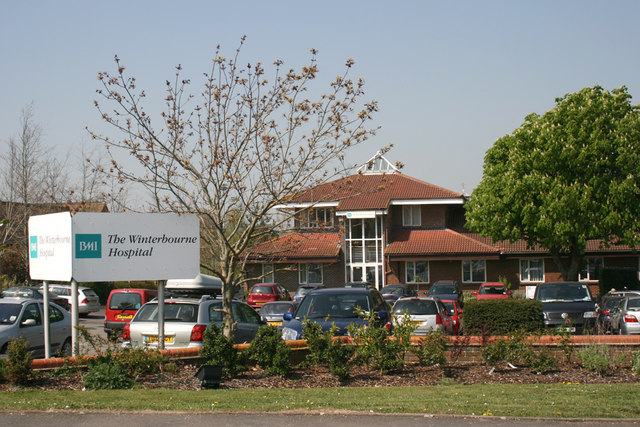
BMI The Winterbourne Hospital

=== Philanthropy ===
In 2013, BMI Healthcare launched the Big Health Pledge to raise awareness of the UK's five biggest preventable killers: lung disease, heart disease, cancer, liver disease and stroke. It sought to promote healthier living through a range of initiatives in order to lessen the impact these diseases have on the British population.

From 9 to 27 September 2013, BMI Healthcare supported participants taking part in Ask Italian's Grand tour, raising money for Great Ormond Street Hospital Children's Charity. BMI Healthcare provided nurses and physiotherapists to ensure those taking part remained injury free for the length of the tour.

=== Awards ===
At the 2013 Independent Healthcare Awards run by Laing & Buisson, consultants from BMI Healthcare were shortlisted in the Innovation, Outstanding Contribution, Risk Management and Nursing Practice categories.

Annie Ollivierre-Smith, catheter laboratory manager and lead cardiac nurse at BMI The London Independent Hospital, won nurse of the year 2013, at the Nursing Times awards. She was the first nurse ever from the private sector to win the award.

In 2011, BMI Healthcare became the first private healthcare provider in the UK to be awarded VTE (Venous Thromboembolism) exemplar status across all of its sites, recognising its efforts to reduce the health risks associated with Deep Vein Thrombosis and Pulmonary embolism. BMI Healthcare benefited greatly from the expertise of King's Thrombosis Centre, leading to the creation of a National Thrombosis Team tasked with the implementation of VTE prevention policies across BMI Healthcare Hospitals.

== See also ==
- Private medicine in the UK
