= GHG =

GHG or ghg may stand for:

- General Healthcare Group, a British healthcare company
- George H. Goble (1952–2026), American scientist and academic, staff member at Purdue University, also known as "ghg", and a 1996 Ig Nobel Prize winner
- Greenhouse gas, a gas that absorbs and emits radiant energy at thermal infrared wavelengths, causing the greenhouse effect
- Gruppenhorchgerät, a hydrophone array which was used on Nazi Germany's U-boats during the Second World War
- Marshfield Municipal Airport (Massachusetts) (FAA LID: GHG), a public airport located east of the central business district of Marshfield
