= UCL Pi Media =

Student journalism society

Pi Media
- Pi Magazine Autumn 2019, Photography: Pietro Sambuy
- Format: Online, magazine, broadcast
- Founder: Richard Lubbock
- President: Jamie King
- Founded: September 1946 (as a newspaper)
- Country: United Kingdom
- Website: www.uclpimedia.com

UCL Pi Media is the oldest continuously running student journalism society at University College London Union. Initially launched as a newspaper in 1946 and named after former Provost David Pye, it now publishes on three platforms: Pi Online, Pi Magazine and PiTV.

Pi Media's contribution to student journalism has been recognised both within UCL and by other media outlets. Pi Magazine was shortlisted for 'Magazine of the Year' at The Guardian Student Media Awards in 2009 and was named Best Publication at the Students' Union UCL Arts Awards in 2012, 2013, 2016 and 2020.

== History ==
Pi Media was originally launched as a newspaper in 1946, named Pi in honour of the University's Provost, Sir David Pye. In the aftermath of World War II, there was strong popular support amongst UCL students and Union officials for a community project that would bind together the rapidly expanding campus. The newspaper was conceived as a fortnightly news-sheet, written and published internally by UCL students.

The founding editor was Richard Lubbock, a first-year medic, who modelled the four-page broadsheet after the style of an American high school newspaper. The purpose was to provide news and entertainment for students, and journalistic experience for the editorial team.

Front cover of Pi newspaper published 21/1/1954

The paper was popular, charging a small fee for each issue. Though the initial focus was on student politics, as the paper recruited a more diverse base of writers and journalists, new areas began to receive attention. The newspaper's popularity among students was driven by its coverage of sports, academic discourse and regular interviews with London's public figures. Pi drew favourable comparisons with other heavyweight student newspapers, such as the London School of Economics Beaver.

Pi Squared was launched alongside the magazine in October 2006 as a sister publication in newspaper form. In December 2012, following concerns that internal competition between the magazine and the newspaper was mutually harmful, the decision was made by the editorial board to discontinue Pi Squared.

In May 2007, the society constitutionally renamed as Pi Media to take into account its expansion into other media formats.

=== Former contributors ===
- Jonathan Dimbleby, British journalist and TV personality
- Raj Persaud, TV psychiatrist
- Ali Parsa, Founder and CEO of Babylon Health
- Neil Bennett, CEO of Maitland/AMO
- Greg Wood, The Guardian racing correspondent
- Nada Bashir, British journalist and foreign correspondent

== Today ==
Pi Media's content is spread across three different platforms: Pi Online, Pi Magazine and PiTV.

Pi Online is the society's fastest-growing platform which regularly publishes submissions from student writers across six sections: News, Opinion, Features, Science, Lifestyle and Culture. Topics include campus news, student politics, investigations, environmental features, student life advice and coverage of London's cultural activities. Three editors are appointed per section to support the Editors-In-Chief.

Pi Magazine is published biannually and each issue is curated around a specific theme. The magazine contains the same sections as Pi Online, with two articles per section. The magazine is distributed for free around the UCL campus, including UCL Union bars, departmental common rooms and libraries. Although Pi Magazine is primarily available in print form, online copies of the latest issues are available through the society's website. Pi Magazine commissions art and photography from creatives within the UCL student body.

PiTV is the broadcasting arm of Pi Media. It produces a range of video projects, from short documentaries, travel diaries and the Backstage Pass series, to student news coverage, political interviews and UCL Students’ Union investigations.

In recent years, Pi Media has conducted interviews with well-known figures such as Desmond Tutu, Elijah Wood, Nigel Farage, Dominic Raab MP, Rory Stewart, and David Runciman.

=== Committee structure ===
Unlike many other student publications, Pi Media does not have a paid full-time sabbatical editor.

- President
- Treasurer
- Pi Online Editors-in-Chief
- Pi Magazine Editors-in-Chief
- PiTV Editors-in-Chief
- Marketing Officer
- Social Media Officer
- Design Officer
- Events Officer
- Welfare Officer
