= Students' Union UCL =

Students' union in the UK

- Institution: University College London
- Location: Gordon Street, London
- Established: 1893
- Affiliations: Aldwych Group
- Website: studentsunionucl.org

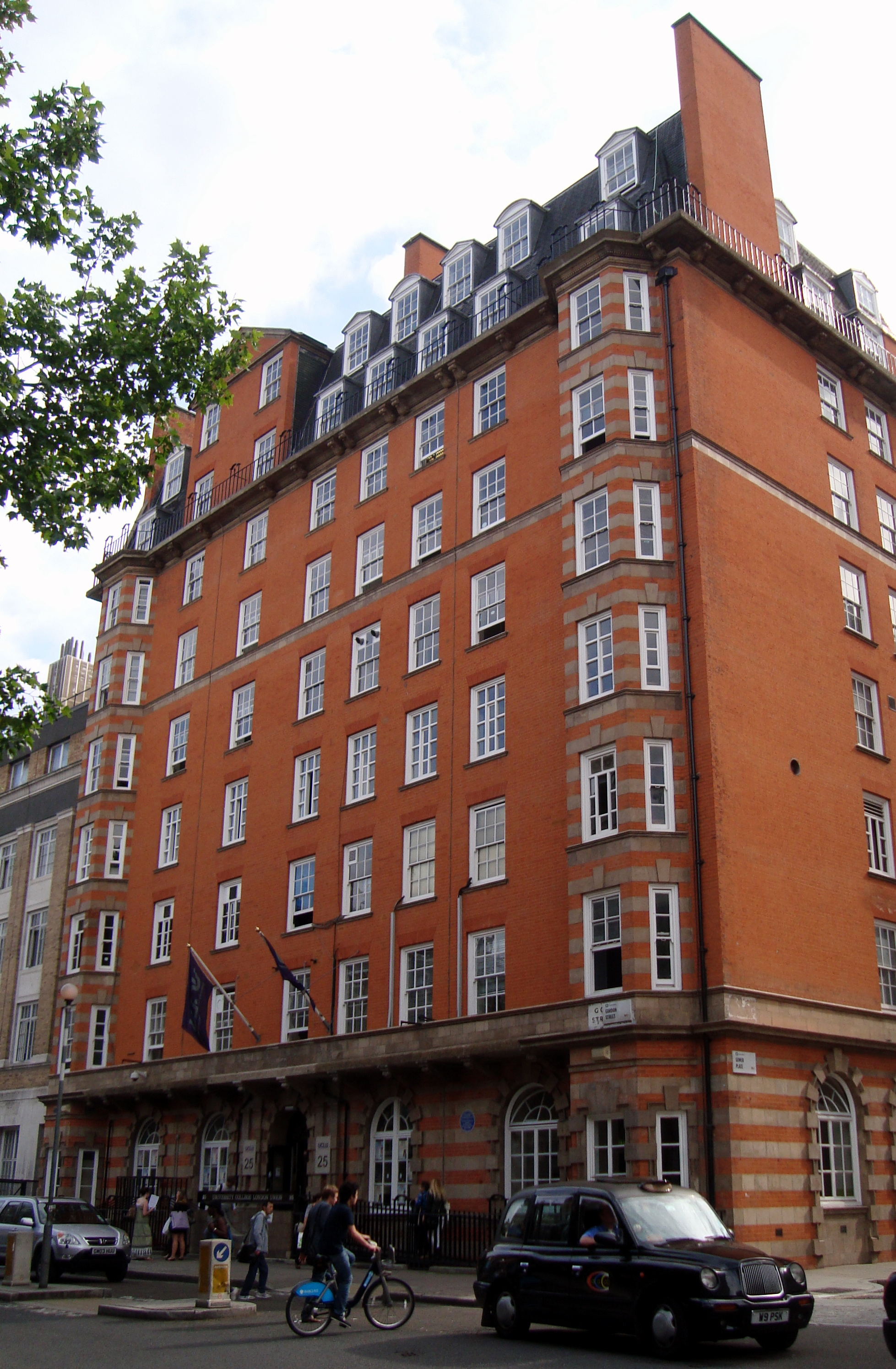
The union's building on Gordon Street

Students' Union UCL (formerly University College London Union) is the students' union of University College London. Founded in 1893, it is one of the oldest students' unions in England, although postdating the Liverpool Guild of Students which formed a student representative council in 1892. It was formed with the following objectives: "the promotion of social intercourse and of the means of recreation, physical and mental, of the students of University College, and the financial successes of students' clubs". UCL Union was the first of its kind as it was formed for both athletics clubs and social activities alike.

Since its formation, the union has taken on responsibility for many aspects of student life. Events for example were seen as a key element hence the establishment of an Ents Committee. A student magazine known as the Gazette was formed a few years later and the Somers Town sports venue was also acquired.

On 8 May 2026, Students' Union UCL disaffiliated from the National Union of Students.

== Organisation ==
Students' Union UCL runs over 300 clubs and societies, as well as four bars, four cafés, two shops and a fitness centre. UCL students through the union have access to put on shows at the Bloomsbury Theatre.

The union's sports clubs have access to several different venues, including Bloomsbury Fitness, the Somers Town Sports Centre and the 100-acre (0.40 km^{2}) Shenley Sports grounds, which Watford Football Club rent for training purposes. Arsenal F.C. rented it as training grounds until 1999. In October 1999 they opened the purpose-built Arsenal Training Centre on a neighbouring 143 acres. On the other side is the de Havilland Aircraft Heritage Centre.

Students' Union UCL provides support to students through Jobshop and the Advice Service, and has a highly active Volunteering Services unit, providing volunteering opportunities for over 1400 students a year.

As well as the magazine Pi, the union's media output includes the radio station Rare FM, the "alternative" magazine The Cheese Grater and a number of smaller publications.

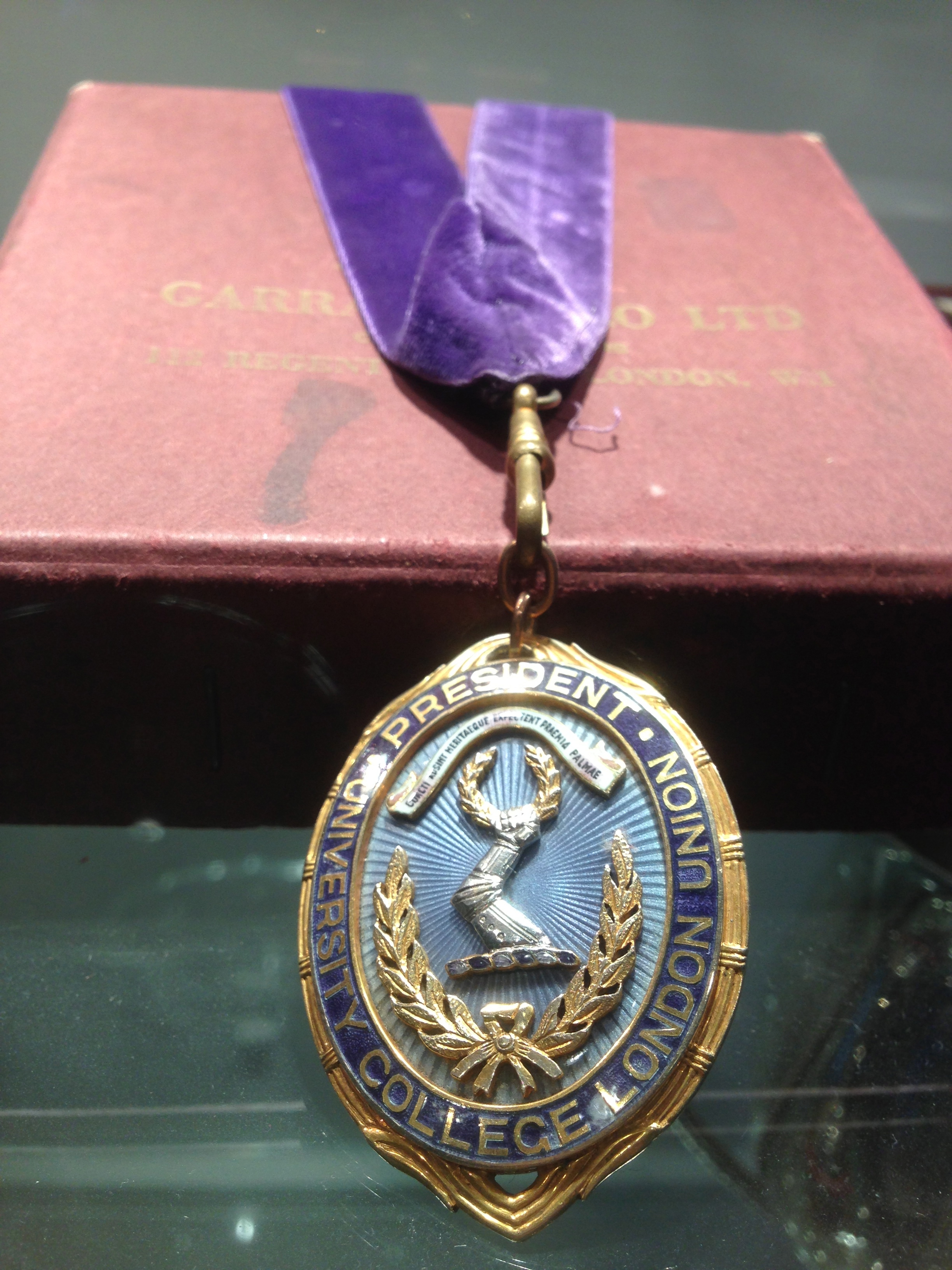
Students' Union UCL president's medallion

=== Charity status ===
Operation of the union lies mainly with elected full-time officers called sabbatical officers and appointed staff. The UCL Union is a registered charity in UK law, a status which requires it to have a trustee board. The board is composed of four of the elected UCLU sabbatical officers (sabbatical trustees), four elected student trustees, and three appointed external trustees. Trustees are charged with responsibility for controlling the charity's work, management and administration on behalf of its members.

=== Officers ===
Students' Union UCL has six elected sabbatical officers, which work full-time in for the Students' Union, so are not classified as students for the year they hold the post. There are also various other officers which represent UCL students in different fields.

==== Sabbatical officers ====
- President
- Activities and Engagement Officer
- Education Officer
- Equity and Inclusion Officer
- Postgraduate Officer
- Welfare and Community Officer

==== Student officers ====
- Accommodation and Housing Officer
- Arts Officer
- Disabled Students' Officer
- Commuter Students’ Officer
- International Students' Officer
- LGBTQ+ Officer
- Mature, Part-Time and Carers Students' Officer
- People of Colour Officer
- Research Students' Officer
- Social Class and Mobility Officer
- Societies Officer
- Sports Officer
- Sustainability Officer
- Trans Officer
- Volunteering Officer
- Women's Officer

There are also student trustees and additional sports representatives.

=== Clubs and societies ===
UCL has numerous clubs and societies, which include sports, film, drama, martial arts, politics and degree-subjects.

The union's Debating Society, founded in 1829 as the Literary and Philosophical Society, is one of the oldest student debating societies in the UK.

The UCL Film & TV Society, founded in 1948, is one of the oldest in the country. It still has a dedicated studio space on campus and continues to both make and screen films. Christopher Nolan and Emma Thomas met and developed some of their earliest films at the society.

== Collections ==
University College London Special Collections holds minute books of the Women's Union Debating Society from 1878 - 1888 and 1924 - 1928.
