= Mouzhan Majidi =

- Born: 9 June 1964 (age 62); Tehran, Imperial State of Iran
- Education: University of Strathclyde
- Occupation: Architect
- Practice: Foster and Partners, Zaha Hadid Architects
- Projects: Hong Kong International Airport; Wembley Stadium

Mouzhan Majidi (born 9 June 1964) is a British-Iranian architect and was Chief Executive of Foster and Partners between 2007 and 2014.

== Biography ==
As a student, he received various awards, including the RIBA Part 1 Design Award in 1985 and RIBA Silver Medal for the best national diploma project in 1987, graduating with first-class honors that year.

On graduation, he joined Foster + Partners, working on Stansted Airport Terminal Building, which was completed in 1991. He was made an associate that year, and was the project architect in charge of two competition-winning schemes for the Cambridge Law Faculty Building and Frejus School in France. In 1992 he moved to Hong Kong as a director responsible for the design of Hong Kong International Airport at Chek Lap Kok from inception to completion in 1998. He was also the director responsible for the new Air Cargo Super Terminal Building for HACTL and the Airport's Ground Transportation Centre. On his return to London, he became the director of Wembley Stadium.

He became a senior partner and group leader in 2004, overseeing various airports, cultural, commercial, infrastructure, residential, leisure and education projects in Europe, the Far East, and America. Most recently, Group 3 has worked on a luxury development on the Red Sea, Egypt, a super-high tower in Moscow, and a mixed-use masterplan on the Russia Hotel, Moscow site.

In 2010, he was awarded Alumnus of the Year by the University of Strathclyde.

In early 2015 he joined Zaha Hadid Architects as Chief Executive.
