= Mutuelle de Santé =

Mutuelle de Santé is a community-based health insurance scheme run by the Rwandan government.

In March 2020 it signed a 10-year contract with Babylon Health to roll out their mobile phone based Babyl service over the next ten years. This is intended to establish a universal primary care service. 30% of the adult population is already registered with the service.

The scheme provides coverage to over 90% of the population and has been positively assessed in multiple studies.
