= Nada Bashir =

British journalist

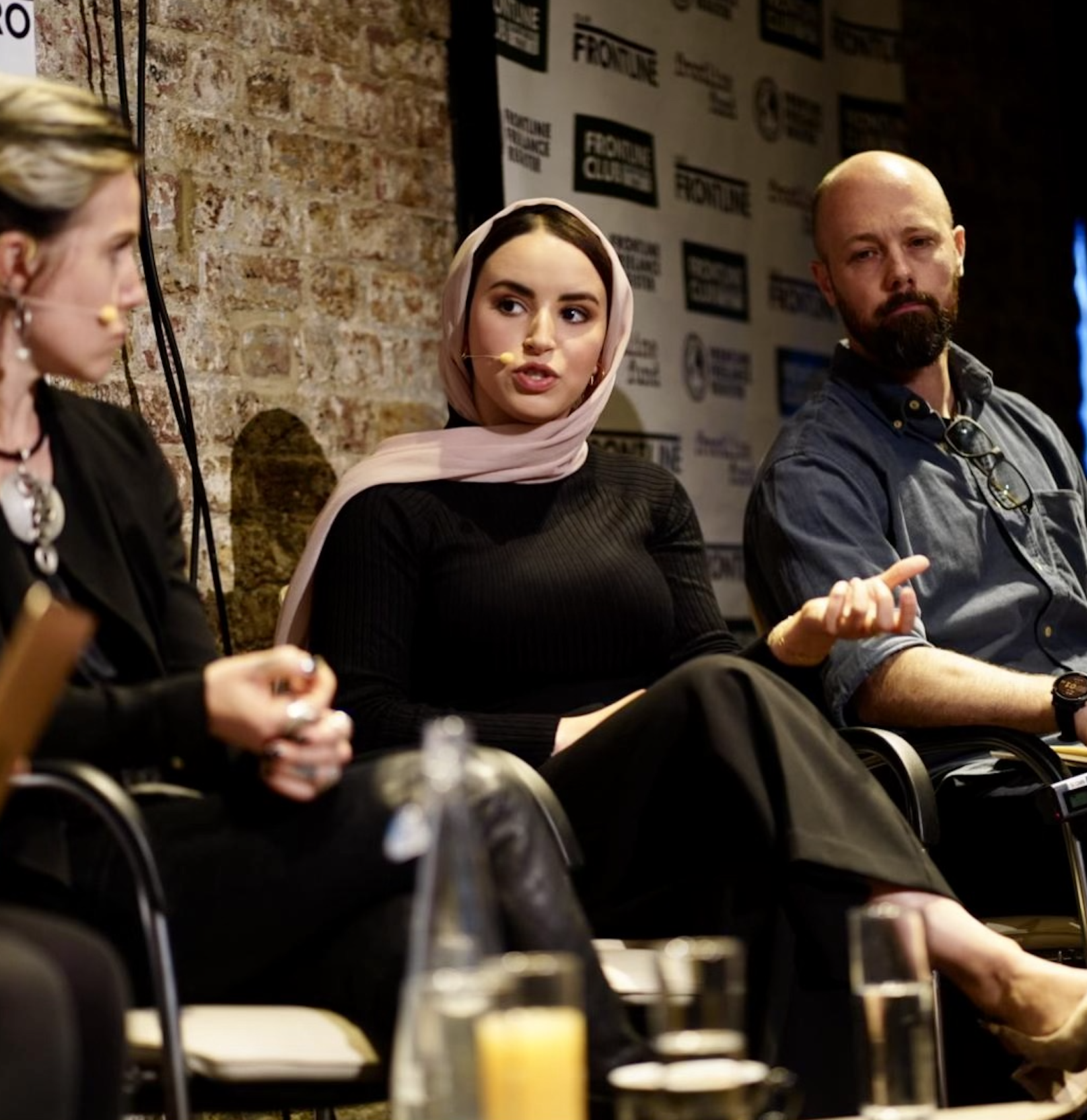
- Bashir speaking at the Frontline Club in 2024
- Born: 17 December 1995 (age 30); Brighton, England
- Education: University College London; London School of Economics
- Occupation: Journalist
- Years active: 2018–present

Nada Bashir (born 17 December 1995) is a British journalist and international correspondent for CNN based in London. Her reporting focuses primarily on the Middle East.

In 2024, Bashir was featured in the Forbes 30 Under 30 Europe list. She was also recognised by the National Academy of Television Arts and Sciences with the Emmy award for Outstanding Emerging Journalist.

== Early life and education ==
Bashir was born in Brighton, England to Libyan parents, her father an aircraft engineer and her mother a preschool teacher. The family later moved to West Kensington, London.

Bashir completed sixth form at the Godolphin and Latymer School in Hammersmith. She then went on to graduate with a Bachelor of Arts (BA) in Politics and East European Studies from University College London (UCL) in 2017. While at UCL, Bashir was an active member of the university's official student news outlet, Pi Media. She was appointed Editor-in-Chief of PiTV in her final year.

In 2020, Bashir graduated with a Master of Science (MSc) degree in Global Politics from the London School of Economics (LSE).

== Career ==
Bashir joined CNN in 2018 as an intern. She went on to continue working with the network as a freelance producer before taking on a staff producer position in 2020.

In 2019, Bashir travelled independently to Iraq's Kurdistan region to report on the influx of refugees escaping violence in northern Syria following Turkey's military incursion into the war-torn country. The story was picked up by CNN's digital platform, Go There, and would become Bashir's first on-camera report.

In 2021, Bashir embedded with Saudi-led coalition forces in Yemen alongside CNN International Diplomatic Editor Nic Robertson and travelled to the frontlines of Marib to report the country's civil war. She later worked with CNN Senior International Correspondent Ben Wedeman in Lebanon to cover anti-government protests taking place around the one-year anniversary of the Beirut port blast.

In 2022, Bashir was promoted to the role of on-air Reporter and has since played a key role in CNN's international coverage, with a particular focus on the Middle East. She was later named International Correspondent in March 2024.

=== As international correspondent ===
In 2023, Bashir was amongst several CNN correspondents deployed to Turkey to report on the aftermath of a deadly 7.8 magnitude earthquake, spending five weeks traveling across the country to cover the story. Later that year, she was also deployed to Morocco to report on a 6.9 magnitude earthquake which devastated several remote villages across the country's Atlas Mountains.

Following the October 7 attacks, Bashir has travelled frequently across the Middle East to report on the Gaza war and the broader regional fallout.

In the early months of the war, Bashir spent several weeks in Jerusalem and the occupied West Bank, reporting on the surge in violence against Palestinians in the Occupied Territories, as well as the humanitarian crisis inside Gaza. She also played a key role in covering the short-lived truce between Israel and Hamas in November 2023, reporting from Ramallah on the release of Palestinian prisoners from Israeli jails as part of a hostage exchange agreement.

In 2024, Bashir gained access to a field hospital established off the coast of Al-Arish in North Sinai, where she met with and interviewed wounded Palestinians recently evacuated from the Gaza Strip. She later reported from Lebanon on growing tensions between Hezbollah and Israel along the country's southern border, and was one of the first international correspondents at the scene following the assassination of senior Hamas official Saleh al-Arouri in Beirut.

She has also covered ceasefire negotiations between Israel and Hamas, traveling frequently to Cairo to follow meetings between diplomatic delegations involved in the talks.

== Awards and recognition ==
- Emmy Award | Outstanding Emerging Journalist - September 2024
- Emmy Award | Outstanding Breaking News Coverage, the Gaza war - September 2024
- Forbes 30 Under 30 | Europe Media List - May 2024
- Emmy Award | Outstanding Live Breaking News Coverage, Russia's invasion of Ukraine - September 2023

== Personal life ==
Bashir is of Libyan heritage, and speaks Arabic.

She states that her father was active in campaigning for democratic reform in Libya during Muammar al-Gaddafi's rule. She has described the Arab Spring as a pivotal moment in her decision to pursue journalism as a career.
