= Bobby Hashemi =

Bobby Hashemi is a British businessman, and is an investor at Union Ventures, a private investment vehicle founded in 2012 by him. In 1995, he co-founded the Coffee Republic (a coffee shop chain) with his sister Sahar Hashemi.

== Early life ==
Bobby Hashemi has an MBA from Amos Tuck School of Business Administration, at Dartmouth College, United States and a BSc in Computer Engineering from Syracuse University, US.

== Career ==
Hashemi started his career as an investment banker in mergers and acquisitions at Lehman Brothers Investment Bank in New York City.

Hashemi founded the Coffee Republic chain with his sister Sahar as CEO and then executive chairman.

The business was founded in late 1995, floated on the London Stock Exchange in 1997, raised £20 million equity over the following 3 years, and by 2001 he exited the business. Then two years later, he re-joined the business from 2003 to 2006 to lead a turnaround of the business and develop the Coffee Republic deli concept.

From 2007 to 2012, Hashemi was a partner and shareholder at Risk Capital Partners, a private equity investment firm with a £75 million fund investing in growth companies across the UK, where he participated in originating, appraising, executing, and monitoring deals across the consumer sector.

== Other activities ==
=== Anyone can Do It ===
With his sister, Sahar Hashemi, he co-authored Anyone Can Do It, a business book about the high street coffee chain Coffee Republic.

=== Speaker ===
Hashemi has spoken about entrepreneurship, building a business, fundraising, private equity investing and the consumer and leisure sectors, and has presented to a variety of audiences and at a number of national events including Imperial College, Barclays Bank, Visa Card, Institute of Directors, Fast Track, Talk Radio UK, British Franchise Association, London Business School, Robert Gordon University and En Passant Magazine.
