= Babylon Health =

Defunct UK subscription health service provider

- Traded as: NYSE: BBLN
- Industry: Health care
- Founded: 2013
- Founder: Ali Parsa
- Defunct: 2023
- Fate: Bankruptcy and sale
- Headquarters: London, United Kingdom
- Revenue: US$322.9 million (2021)
- Number of employees: 2,189 (2021)
- Website: babylonhealth.com

Babylon Health was a health service provider that utilized artificial intelligence and virtual clinical operations. Patients were connected with health care professionals through their web and mobile application. The company's subscription business model for private healthcare services was introduced in the UK in 2013, and later expanded to 17 countries. In 2019 the company covered over 20 million people and provided over 5,000 consultations per day.

Babylon Health's American branch filed for bankruptcy in August 2023 and the British branch called in the administrator weeks later. In August 2023, Forbes reported the company was "winding down" its business in Rwanda, potentially disrupting care for 2.8 million people. In August 2023, Babylon Health's UK operations were bought by eMed Healthcare UK, limited. This allowed its private and "GP at Hand" NHS business to continue operating under the new brand name "eMed".

== History ==
The company was founded in 2013 by Ali Parsa, who was previously the CEO of the Circle Health hospital operator and an investment banker. Babylon Health was owned by its holding company Babylon Holdings Limited along with Babylon's technology branch. In 2014 Babylon Health Services Ltd. registered with the Care Quality Commission.

In January 2016, Babylon Health received investments from Hoxton Ventures, Kinnevik and the founders of Google Deepmind, among others. According to the company, around 4,000 daily medical consultations were offered in 2019.

Steve Davis was the company’s chief technology officer until 2023, when he left to join Procore. Davis led Babylon’s efforts to implement AI-powered healthcare tools.

== Services ==
Babylon Health provided health care services through its website, iOS and Android mobile applications. Users could send questions or photos to the company's team of health care professionals (which included doctors, nurses, and therapists) in a manner similar to a text message, or hold video messaging consultations with a clinician. In situations where a physical examination was required users could book health exams with a limited number of facilities in London.

In addition to the direct healthcare services, users could access various health monitoring tools such as an activity tracker, order home blood-test kits and review general lifestyle and fitness questions.

== Operations ==
=== Canada ===
In September 2018, Babylon formed a partnership with the Canadian digital solutions company Telus Health to provide its services in Canada. In 2021, Babylon stopped providing clinical healthcare services in Canada and entered into a software licensing deal with Telus.

=== Rwanda ===
In September 2016, Babylon Health launched in Rwanda as Babyl, in partnership with the Bill and Melinda Gates Foundation. Rwanda was the first country outside of the UK to acquire Babylon Health's services. By May 2018, Babyl was reported to have 2 million members, covering roughly 30% of Rwanda's adult population.

In 2018 Babylon launched their AI chatbot in Rwanda. At the time of launch, the Babylon AI system did not include some common diseases relevant to Rwanda such as tuberculosis or malaria.

In January 2020, Babylon Health reported 1 million completed consultations in Rwanda. In March 2020, the company signed a 10-year partnership with the Rwandan government, agreeing to roll out Babyl to all Rwandans over the age of 12 through Mutuelle de Santé.

=== United Kingdom ===
In the UK, Babylon Health provided services via private subscription, pay-as-you-go, and through the private medical insurer Bupa from 2013.

==== NHS-funded free GP at Hand ====
In November 2017, Babylon launched GP at Hand, a free-at-the-point-of-care NHS-funded service. In August 2021 Babylon GP at Hand had a list of over 100,000 patients. The service was criticised for explicitly discouraging registration of patients with complex care needs.

==== Cuts, administration, and sale ====
In August 2022 Babylon Health announced cuts to its NHS GP at Hand service in Birmingham as it was not profitable. The same month, shortly after the opening of large-scale office space to accommodate clinical staff, founder Ali Parsa held a company-wide video conference in which he announced widespread company cutbacks. Nearly half the workforce was made redundant, including many head office staff who had been working at Babylon since its founding. Parsa was replaced as director by Miami-based Michael Cole.

The company collapsed into administration in September 2023 and its assets were sold for £500,000 to US company eMed Healthcare.

=== United States ===
Babylon began operations in North America in 2018. In August 2019, Babylon Health announced their intent to expand into the United States. In May 2020, Babylon Health announced a partnership with Mount Sinai Health Partners to make the app and its healthcare services available to New Yorkers during the COVID-19 pandemic. New Yorkers could consult doctors from the New York Telemedicine Association.

In October 2020, Babylon Health and Home State Health announced their partnership to introduce Babylon 360 to health plan members living in 10 counties in Southeast Missouri, where Babylon would serve as the primary care physician via its mobile application. In April 2021, Babylon Health acquired Meritage Medical Network, a medical group with 700 physicians based in California. In January 2022, Babylon Health acquired Higi, a consumer health engagement firm, and DayToDay Health, a care management platform.

== Funding ==
In January 2016, Babylon raised a $25 million Series A round. This was considered the highest raised funding for a digital health venture in Europe. Its investors include Hoxton Ventures and Kinnevik AB. In April 2017, it raised a further $60 million to develop its artificial intelligence capabilities.

Babylon's series C funding in August 2019 was led by Saudi Arabia's Public Investment Fund. It raised $550 million. Notable investors include the ERGO Fund, Kinnevik AB, and VNV Global formerly known as Vostok New Ventures. In April 2020, Kinnevik AB reduced their valuation of Babylon due to "greater uncertainty over the roll-out of existing partnership contracts as a result of COVID-19." In September 2020, Kinnevik further reduced their valuation of Babylon.

In October 2021 Babylon went public on the NYSE (ticker BBLN) via a SPAC merger with Alkuri Global Acquisition Corp, valued at $4.2 billion. Parsa later described his decision an "unbelievable, unmitigated disaster" after the share price collapsed. In May 2022 the share price dropped from around $1.50 to $1. Parsa said, "the UK government pays you to look after people in our [average] age cohort two to three times a year... in reality, people use us six or seven times a year and we lose money on every member that comes in." The company had announced a nearly threefold increase in revenue for the first quarter of 2022, to $266 million.

On June 28 2023, Babylon announced it would delist from the NYSE, transfer "core operating subsidiaries of the Company" to MindMaze SA, and stated it "will not provide for any payment to the Company’s Class A ordinary shareholders or other equity instrument holders, as AlbaCore will be exercising rights under its debt agreements with the Company to transition the go-forward business by transferring core operating subsidiaries of the Company to MindMaze". However, on August 7 2023, Babylon announced that the transaction "would not proceed" and that "Babylon is exiting its core US business". On August 11 2023, Forbes reported Babylon was “winding down” its business in Rwanda, potentially disrupting care for 2.8 million people. On August 15, 2023, Babylon announced that they would also be liquidating in the US within a Chapter 7 bankruptcy liquidation.

== Criticisms and controversy ==
=== Unsupported claims and chatbot safety ===
There were concerns raised regarding the governance of Babylon Health, in particular the use of misleading promotional claims and the safety and quality of the advice offered by its artificial intelligence chatbot. Critical safety concerns relating to the chatbot were raised with UK regulatory authorities.

In June 2018, the company announced that its AI could diagnose health issues as well as a human doctor. These claims have been widely disputed and the methods of evaluation utilized by Babylon discredited. In November 2018, a The Lancet publication concluded "Babylon's study does not offer convincing evidence that its Babylon Diagnostic and Triage System can perform better than doctors in any realistic situation, and there is a possibility that it might perform significantly worse. If this study is the only evidence for the performance of the Babylon Diagnostic and Triage System, then it appears to be early in stage 2 of the STEAD framework (preclinical). Further clinical evaluation is necessary to ensure confidence in patient safety."

The safety concerns relating to the chatbot highlighted significant gaps within the medical device regulatory framework for telehealth apps. In the UK, medical AI chatbots may be registered as a class 1 medical device, thus are not subject to any form of regulatory approval. In February 2020, safety concerns relating to the Babylon AI chatbot were the subject of a BBC Newsnight investigation. The UK's medical device regulatory body, the Medicines and Healthcare products Regulatory Agency (MHRA), has acknowledged the 'concerns' regarding Babylon Health.

=== Investigation by Alberta's Privacy Commissioner ===
In April 2020, Alberta's privacy commissioner launched two investigations into Babylon, by Telus Health, over non-compliance and medical privacy concerns. The reports found that the province's health information privacy laws when ignored when the Telus Babylon App was launched, commenting, "I think what we have here is an example of an app that was developed in another jurisdiction and was dropped into Alberta without due regard for Alberta's legislation."

=== Sales of COVID-19 antibody tests ===
In May 2020, Babylon Health marketed a non-MHRA-approved COVID-19 antibody home testing kit that used capillary blood (finger-prick). Abbott, which developed the sole approved antibody test at the time to work on venous samples, released a statement advising that the test should not be conducted with capillary samples. The MHRA asked all providers of COVID-19 antibody testing services using capillary blood to stop providing these services and advised the public to ignore any result they receive from these private kits.

=== Babylon App Data breach ===
In June 2020, a data breach occurred in which three patients were provided with access to recordings of other patients' video consultations. Babylon Health claimed the breach was live for 2 hours and was due to a software error. Following the breach, a Digital Health investigation found that a series of technical information exposing potential weaknesses in Babylon Health's technology was freely available through a Firebase database mistakenly left open. The assessment report was published on GitHub.

=== Legal dispute with Care Quality Commission ===
In 2017, Babylon made a legal challenge in the High Court to prevent the Care Quality Commission (CQC) from publishing a report that raised several concerns regarding the potential for prescriptions being misused and information not always being shared with the patient's primary GP. The High Court ruled against the injunction and the report was published in December 2017. Babylon agreed to pay the regulator £11,000 in costs.

=== Collapse ===
Babylon Health, once valued at around $4.2 billion, collapsed following criticism over unfulfilled promises, governance issues, and lack of clinically verified outcomes. Its failure has been compared to other high-profile technology collapses, such as Theranos, and is often cited as a warning for companies in emerging AI-related industries.
