= General Healthcare Group =

British healthcare company

- Industry: Healthcare
- Founded: 1970
- Headquarters: London, UK
- Key people: Peter Gershon, Chairman; Jill Watts, Chief Executive
- Revenue: £855m (2010)
- Parent: Netcare
- Subsidiaries: BMI Healthcare
- Website: www.generalhealthcare.co.uk

General Healthcare Group PLC (GHG) is a British healthcare company. It owns BMI Healthcare. As of 2019 BMI operates 54 hospitals and clinics in the United Kingdom.

== History ==
The name "General Healthcare Group" dates to 1993, when AMI, a US for-profit hospital provider which had expanded into the UK in the 1970s, renamed itself BMI Healthcare, creating GHG as its corporate group name. AMI had been floated on the London Stock Exchange in 1988, and was acquired by Generale de Santé (a subsidiary of Compagnie Générale des Eaux) in 1990.

In 1997, both Generale de Santé and GHG were acquired by private equity group Cinven, with BMI's international activities transferred to Generale de Santé, leaving BMI Healthcare active only in the UK. In 1998 Amicus Healthcare Group was acquired from Compass Group and merged into GHG. Cinven sold GHG to another private equity group in 2000, and a consortium led by South African healthcare group Netcare acquired the company in 2006.

In 2008, BMI purchased nine hospitals in Birmingham, Bury St Edmunds, Gerrards Cross, Harrogate, Huddersfield, Lancaster, Lincoln, North London and Nottingham from Nuffield Health to build on their existing BMI Healthcare business.

In 2018, BMI sold 35 of its hospitals to Hospital Topco Limited.

== See also ==
- Private healthcare in the United Kingdom
