= Coffee Republic =

British coffee bar and deli chain

Coffee Republic Retail Limited

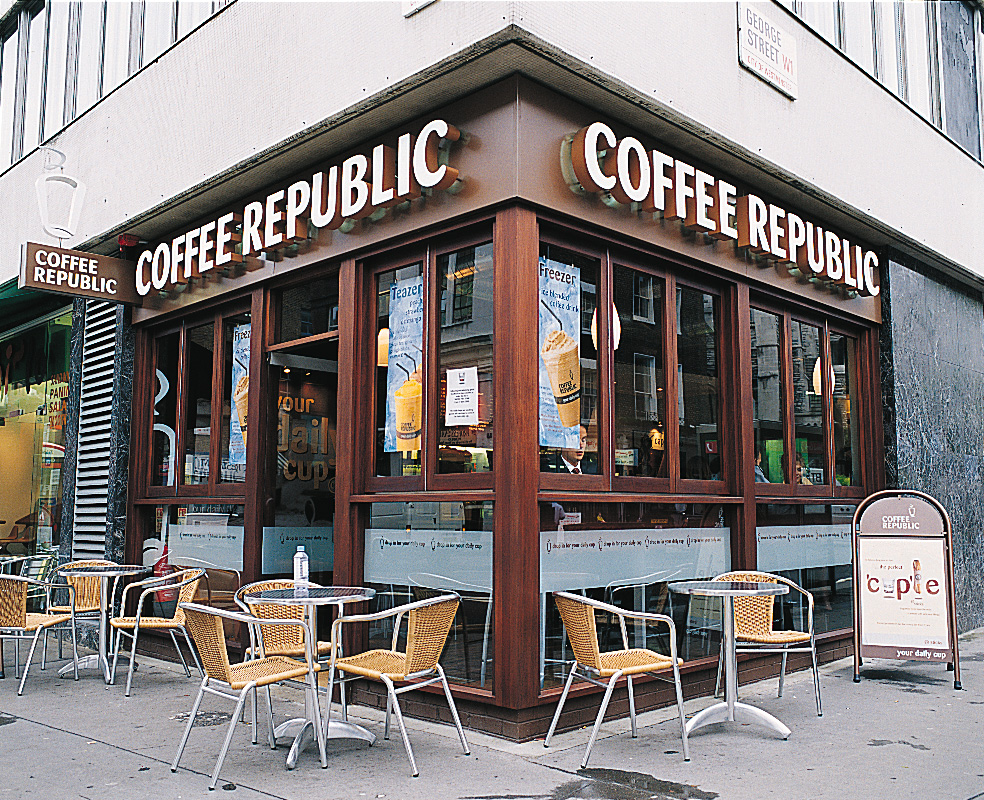
- Old style bar on George Street, London.
- Trade name: Coffee Republic
- Type: Private
- Industry: Restaurants
- Founded: 1995; 31 years ago
- Founder: Bobby Hashemi and Sahar Hashemi
- Headquarters: London, England
- Number of locations: 16 (2026)
- Area served: England, Scotland, Jersey, Spain
- Products: Blended Coffee Beans; Boxed Tea; Made-to-order beverages Bottled beverages Baked Goods; Merchandise; Milkshakes; Smoothies
- Website: coffeerepublic.co.uk

Coffee Republic Retail Limited, trading as Coffee Republic, is a British coffee bar and deli franchise chain founded in 1995. As of 2026, the brand operates a total of 16 locations, consisting of 12 coffee shops across England, Scotland, and Jersey, alongside four airport locations in Spain.

== History ==
Coffee Republic was founded in 1995 by brother and sister team Bobby and Sahar Hashemi, opening its first site in London's South Molton Street. By 1997 Coffee Republic had opened a further seven stores in London and opened its first stores in Newcastle and Manchester.

The group was listed on AIM in 1998 by reversing into Arion Properties. The group grew to 24 branches after opening 17 new sites between March and November and had expanded to York, Birkenhead, Newcastle and Manchester.

In July 2000, Coffee Republic transferred from AIM to the London Stock Exchange main market. At that point it operated 61 coffee bars and cafés, with announced plans to open a further 80 by 2002.

Bobby Hashemi stepped down as chief executive in March 2001, but continued as a non-executive director; he returned as executive chairman in the summer of 2002.

Coffee Republic bought the GoodBean coffee bar chain in December 2001, thus gaining 12 outlets in south-east England and seven further sites under construction. The acquisition took the group to 108 outlets.

In July 2002, the group announced plans to halt its expansion programme, sell underperforming bars and launch a strategic business review as annual losses grew. A number of takeover talks ensued with easyGroup, Benjys and Caffè Nero but all offers were rejected. Coffee Republic sold 13 sites to Starbucks and returned to an AIM listing.

In August 2003, Coffee Republic unveiled a survival plan to convert itself into a New York–style deli-bar chain called Coffee Republic Deli and whittle its numbers down to a core of 50 outlets. It piloted the concept at Baker Street and Exchange Street in London.

In June 2004 Coffee Republic sold eight outlets in Cardiff and southern England to Caffè Nero. The group signed its first franchise deal in November 2005 and ended the year with four franchised outlets. It intended to retain just 10 to 15 bars under company ownership.

In October 2006 Founder Bobby Hashemi was ousted in a shareholder revolt and replaced as chairman by Peter Breach.

The company signed a franchise agreement in 2007, with the intent to see the brand launched in Northern Ireland, the Republic of Ireland and also Turkey. In June 2006 its first bar opened in Bulgaria in Burgas, and in July its first bar opened in Turkey in Istanbul.

In June 2008 its first bar opened in Romania in Bucharest.

In July 2008 Coffee Republic announced that Steven Bartlett, the former shareholder who ousted the company's founder, had stepped down as chief executive.

In August 2008 the first bar in Kuwait opened.

The company's first bar opened in Jeddah, Saudi Arabia in January 2009.

The company was placed into administration in early July 2009 and trading in shares was suspended. At the end of July, following the closure of 18 bars, Coffee Republic was bought out of administration by property firm Arab Investment Ltd. The new company trades as Coffee Republic Trading Ltd.

== Operations and locations ==
As of 2026, Coffee Republic operates a total of 16 locations across the United Kingdom and Spain. In the UK, the company maintains 12 coffee shops, comprising 10 locations in England, one in Scotland, and one in Jersey. Internationally, the chain is present in Spain with four airport locations situated in Madrid, Barcelona, and the Canary Islands.

In the early 2000s, Coffee Republic operated over 100 company-owned bars. Following the closure of most of its corporate estate, the brand rebuilt its footprint back to around 100 locations, shifting predominantly to a franchised model. In addition to these outlets, the company expanded through a domestic concession network of approximately 100 further locations, anchored primarily by Cineworld and Greene King.

Its former international footprint included five locations in Bulgaria; four in Kuwait; three locations each in Bahrain, the Isle of Man, Pakistan, and Saudi Arabia; two locations each in Jersey, Jordan, and Qatar; and single locations in Cyprus, Ireland, Lithuania, Malta, Oman, Romania, Turkey, the United Arab Emirates, and the United States.

Alongside its traditional coffee shops, Coffee Republic expanded its domestic presence through B2B agreements. Originally introduced in 2006, the company's wholesale operations and its "Coffee Republic To Go" automated vending machines, launched in 2008, supplied coffee to convenience stores, corporate offices, and petrol stations. Following a 2015 partnership with the Royal Voluntary Service, the brand's supply network expanded into hospital cafes and shops. In 2017, this entire B2B and supply network was rebranded under the "Delighted to Serve" program, which historically grew to serve over 300 partners.

== See also ==
- List of coffeehouse chains
