= Kour Pour =

- Born: 1987 (age 38–39); Exeter, Devon, England
- Education: Otis College of Art and Design
- Occupations: Painter, printmaker
- Website: www.kourpour.com

Kour Pour (born 1987) is a British-born American artist, who is of British and Iranian-descent. His artwork is inspired by living between different cultures and he works primarily in painting and printmaking. Pour is best known for a series of carpet paintings. He lives in Los Angeles.

== Early life and education ==
Faded, 2011, Acrylic on canvas over panel, 84” x 60”

Kour Pour was born in 1987 in Exeter, Devon county, England. His Iranian father moved from Iran to England at the age of 14; and his British mother was born in England. His father owned a small carpet shop in England, and Pour would spend time there as a child.

He also often travelled to Los Angeles to visit family members on his father’s side. He attended Santa Monica College, and would ultimately move there to attend Otis College of Art and Design (BFA, 2010).

== Career ==
Living in Los Angeles, he was exposed to hip-hop and became interested in the idea of sampling as it is practiced in music production, and how he might apply similar principles in his artwork.

In 2014, Pour had his first solo exhibition at New York City's Untitled gallery, which "drew a frenzy" and sold out.

Pour was featured on Forbes' 30 Under 30 list in 2015 and in 2017.

== Imagery ==
Detail of work showing replication of warp and weft

Pour's time in his father’s carpet shop and his interest in hip-hop are synthesized in an ongoing series of carpet paintings, a series which Pour began in his last year of school at Otis College of Art and Design. Each of the first paintings in this series was based on a particular rug or carpet that the artist researched from exhibition and auction catalogues. Later paintings in this series utilize structures and images drawn from existing carpets, but incorporate the artist's own designs as well. Pour's own designs drawn inspiration from a mashup of sources, sampling imagery from a range of places, but all of the elements date pre-Victorian era.

Pour's carpet paintings are well-known and highly desirable, and the artist intends to continue producing these works alongside other series. In recent years, he has produced a series of paintings utilizing traditional Japanese woodblock printing techniques (specifically ukiyo-e) but at a much larger scale than the processes were traditionally applied to. Another series of paintings employs paper pulp, which Pour began to work with due to his interest in origami, and the lesser-known paper craft form tsugigami. Pour began making his own paper, and mixing the paper pulp with various pigments; after some experimentation, he came around to the idea of creating a series of works using the pigmented paper pulp in lieu of paint, sculpting the pulp onto panels covered with linen. Both the woodblock paintings and the paper pulp paintings are based on Japanese Geological Survey maps, which Pour noticed for their similarities to abstract paintings from Europe and America.

== Process ==
His paintings take months to develop. A canvas is mounted on panel and the artist begins by priming it with several layers of gesso to represent the warp and weft of woven rugs. He uses a broomstick to apply these layers. He then silkscreens an image of the rug onto his prepared surface. Details are then meticulously painted in, using acrylics in a somewhat more vibrant palette than that used by the artisans in the rugs of the Silk Road merchants he typically copies. After months of this preparatory work, he then erases parts of the image with a circular sander. Finally he repaints these obliterated areas as much as possible to produce the finished work.

== Notable exhibitions ==
=== Solo exhibitions ===
- 2019 – Manzareh/Keshiki/Landscape at Ever Gold [Projects] (San Francisco, California)
- 2019 – Returnee at THE CLUB (Tokyo, Japan)
- 2018 – Abrash at Shane Campbell Gallery (Chicago, Illinois)
- 2018 – Polypainting at GNYP Gallery (Berlin, Germany)
- 2018 – Polypainting at Pearl Lam Galleries (Hong Kong, China)
- 2017 – Kour Pour at Pearl Lam Galleries (Hong Kong, China)
- 2016 – Onnagata at Feuer/Mesler (New York City, New York)
- 2016 – Onnagata at Gnyp Gallery (Berlin, Germany)
- 2015 – Samsara at Depart Foundation (Los Angeles, California)
- 2014 – Ozymandias at Ellis King (Dublin, Ireland)
- 2014 – Kour Pour at UNTITLED (New York City, New York)

=== Group exhibitions ===
- 2025/26 - Cosmic Diagrams at Aga Khan Museum, Toronto.
- 2020 – Glitch: Art and Technology Exhibitions at Margo Veillon Gallery, AUC Tahrir Square, The American University in Cairo (Cairo, Egypt)
- 2019 – LA Painting at Museum of Art and History (Lancaster, UK)
- 2019 – Gold Standard at Ever Gold [Projects] (San Francisco, California)
- 2018 – Mossavar-Nameh at Dastan’s Basement, Art Dubai
- 2017 – Decoration Never Dies, Anyway at Tokyo Metropolitan Teien Art Museum (Tokyo, Japan)
- 2017 – Horror Vacui, or The Annihilation of Space at Misako & Rosen (Tokyo, Japan)
- 2017 – Kazuo Shiraga and Kour Pour: Earthquakes and The Mid Winter Burning Sun at Ever Gold [Projects] (San Francisco, California)
- 2016 – Labyrinth(s) at Pearl Lam Galleries (Hong Kong, China)
- 2015 – Painting Show – Part One at Galerie Rudiger Schottle (Munich, Germany)
- 2015 – From Above at Di Donna (New York City, New York)
- 2014 – The Go Between at Museo di Capodimonte (Naples, Italy)
- 2012 – In The Making at Roberts & Tilton (Los Angeles, California)
- 2012 – Wet Paint 4 at Steve Turner Gallery (Los Angeles, California)

== Art market ==
An exhibition of his paintings at the Untitled Gallery (New York) in 2014 generated intense interest. All seven canvases, depicting Persian rugs and priced at $15,000 each, were snapped up by buyers. In 2015, a painting by Pour sold at a Sotheby’s auction in Doha, Qatar for $162,500, well over the estimate of $70,000-$90,000.

== Bibliography ==
- Pour, Kour. "Kour Pour: In Conversation With Robert Summers." LXAQ Issue #1, 8 Sept., 2016, https://sfaq.us/2016/10/kour-pour-in-conversation-with-robert-summers/.
- Balaghi, Shiva. Pour, Kour. "LA Transplants." A Magazine, 7 Dec., 2016
