= Sahar Hashemi =

British businesswoman

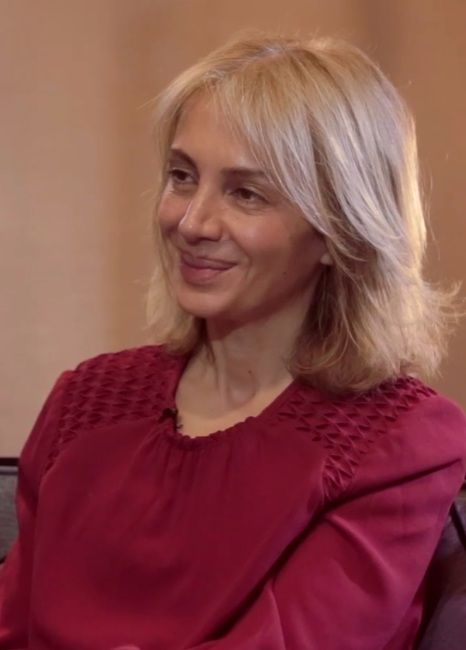
Sahar Hashemi, May 2014.

Sahar Hashemi OBE (born 1967) is a British businesswoman, best known as the co-founder of the coffee chain Coffee Republic and confectionery brand Skinny Candy. She co-chaired the UK government Scale Up Taskforce shaping government policy towards growing SMEs. She currently sits on the board of the Scale Up Institute, and the advisory board of the ECB HUNDRED Cricket Competition and Change Please Coffee, a social enterprise that trains and hires homeless people to run coffee bars.

In 2022 she founded Buy Women Built a campaign to bring consumer recognition to women built brands in the UK. She was a judge at the 2020 Entrepreneur of the Year Awards.

== Early life ==
Sahar Hashemi attended City of London School for Girls, obtaining a corporation exhibition scholarship. She studied law at the University of Bristol. Upon graduation, Hashemi trained and qualified as a solicitor with Frere Cholmeley Bischoff's (a 200-year-old firm in Lincoln's Inn Fields that folded in 1998).

== Business ventures ==
Alongside brother Bobby, Hashemi developed and co-founded Coffee Republic, the UK's first US-style coffee bar chain. The first site opened on South Molton Street in 1995. The group was listed on AIM in 1998 by reversing into Arion Properties. Coffee Republic switched from AIM to the full list in July 2000. The chain had opened 108 stores by 2001, when Hashemi left the firm to write Anyone Can Do It: Building Coffee Republic from Our Kitchen Table.

In 2005, Hashemi launched confectionery brand Skinny Candy, producing low-fat sweets and chocolates. The range was distributed in Coffee Republic, Harvey Nichols, Selfridges, Top Shop, Julian Graves and Waitrose. In 2007, Hashemi sold 50% of Skinny Candy to Glisten Plc.

== Books ==
Published in 2003 by John Wiley & Sons, Anyone Can Do It (ISBN 978-1841127651) was written jointly by Sahar and Bobby Hashemi and describes the journey of turning Coffee Republic from an idea into a high street brand.

Published in 2019 by Troubador Publishing, Start Up Forever (ISBN 978-1789016345) is the culmination of her work speaking to 400 organisations about the actionable, practical steps that can bring out anyone’s inner entrepreneur. It was named The Financial Times Best Business Book of the Month in March 2019.

Hashemi founded Buy Women Built, a campaign to increase consumer recognition of women-founded consumer brands in the United Kingdom. She has said the idea followed a social media post by the technology executive Jacqueline de Rojas suggesting that consumers could support women by buying from them. In 2023 the campaign introduced a kitemark that vetted members may display on packaging and websites. Applicants are assessed annually against criteria including that the founder is the public face of the business, is involved in its day-to-day operations, and holds shares in it. By 2026 the community included more than 2,300 female-founded brands. Retailers including Ocado, Whole Foods Market and Tesco have run promotions featuring participating brands. Hashemi has said she started the campaign partly in reaction to the emphasis placed on the low share of venture capital received by female founders, arguing that this frames the issue around what women lack rather than encouraging entrepreneurship.

== Charity work ==
Hashemi is a supporter of The Princes Trust, donating a portion of royalties of Anyone Can Do It to the youth charity. She sits on the NSPCC Corporate Development Board and is a Patron of Child Bereavement UK. She fronted a government campaign in 2004 for Skills for Business to encourage employers to develop staff skills.

== Awards and recognition ==
She was appointed Officer of the Order of the British Empire (OBE) in the 2012 Birthday Honours for services to the UK economy and to charity. She has been named on various power lists, including the Independent on Sunday.

- World Economic Forum, Davos: Young Global Leader
- Management Today: Top 35 Women in British business under 35
- Independent on Sunday: 20 most powerful women in Britain
