= Ali Parsa =

British-Iranian healthcare entrepreneur and former investment banker

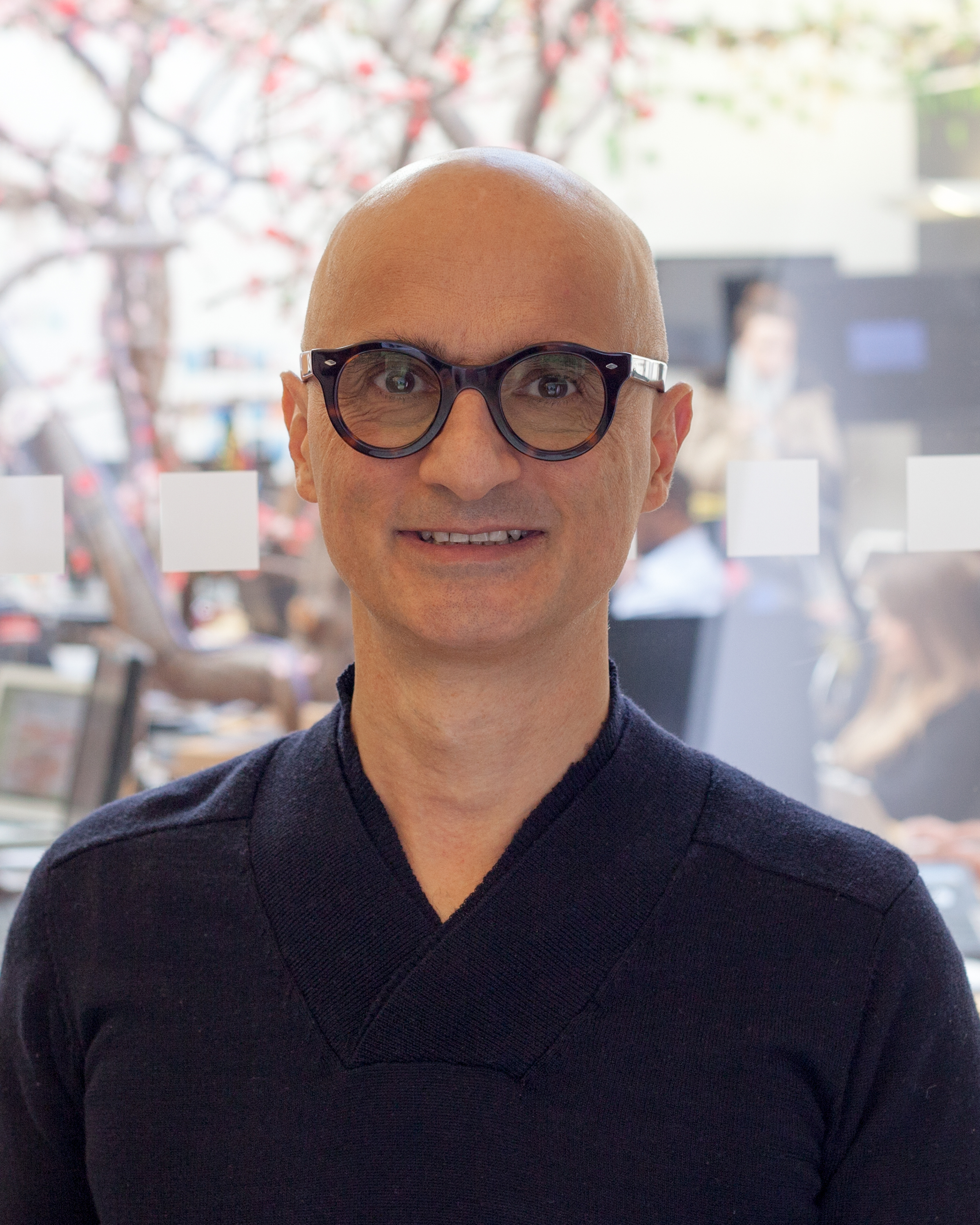
- Born: 24 January 1965 (age 61); Rasht, Imperial State of Iran
- Education: University College London
- Occupation: Healthcare entrepreneur
- Known for: Founder of Babylon Health, Co-founder of Circle Health

Ali Parsadoust (commonly known as Ali Parsa; born 24 January 1965) is a British-Iranian healthcare entrepreneur and former investment banker. He is the founder and CEO of the bankrupt digital healthcare company Babylon Health and the co-founder and former CEO of hospital operator Circle Health.

== Career ==
=== Early career ===
Parsa was born in Rasht, Gilan Province, Iran to ethnic Persian middle-class parents. In 1981, he left Iran in the aftermath of the Iranian revolution. After teaching himself O and A-levels, he attended University College London (UCL), where he studied civil and environmental engineering and wrote for the student newspaper Pi. After completing his bachelor's degree in 1987, he continued at UCL, earning a PhD in engineering physics in 1995. During his studies Parsa co-founded Victoria & Gilan (V&G), a media promotion company for which he won the Royal Award for the Young Entrepreneur of the Year in 1993. Parsa sold V&G in 1995 to join Credit Suisse First Boston as an investment banker where he was hired by Stephen Hester, who later served as CEO of Royal Bank of Scotland. At Credit Suisse he led corporate finance. In 1997, he moved to Merrill Lynch where he spent two years in technology and UK investment banking. Between 1999 and 2001, Parsa continued at Goldman Sachs, where he was an executive director of the European technology banking team.

=== Circle Health ===
Parsa set up Circle Health in 2004, the first private company to run a UK National Health Service (NHS) hospital. Circle Health became Europe's largest partnership of clinicians, with about £200 million of annualised revenue and about 3,000 employees. Circle Health was taken public in 2012, when Parsa stepped down as Chief Executive Officer.

On 4 December 2012, the private healthcare provider Circle then in charge of the Hinchingbrooke Health Care Trust (the only privately run NHS hospital in the UK) announced that Circle’s founder Ali Parsa had stepped down from his role as chief executive.

Michael Kirkwood, chairman of Circle Holdings, indicated that Dr Ali Parsa would be spending more time fulfilling his passion for social entrepreneurship.

Circle had fallen behind on its plans to turn around the trust’s financial problems, with Hinchingbrooke posting a deficit for the first half of 2012-13 of £4.1 million, £2.2 million more than planned.

The National Audit Office subsequently raised questions about the procurement process for the franchise, stating that the company would “have to generate savings at an unprecedented level”.

Mr Parsa had been due to give evidence at a House of Commons public accounts committee hearing on the franchising of NHS trusts the following week.

In 2015, Circle lost its contract to run the Hinchingbrooke Health Care Trust after receiving severe criticism from the Care Quality Commission.

=== Babylon Health ===
Parsa launched Babylon Health, a developer of mobile healthcare apps, in 2014. Headquartered in London, Babylon Health is a subscription health service provider that enables users to have virtual consultations with doctors and health care professionals via text and video messaging through its mobile application.

Parsa is an advocate of more private-sector involvement in the NHS, believing it improves efficiency, profitability and quality of healthcare. In 2017 Parsa claimed that Babylon Health was "the beginning of the end for the old-fashioned way we use healthcare" and that within a few years computers would perform better than doctors at making diagnoses.

The Babylon app chatbot was not entirely successful; The Times newspaper of 13 October 2019, reported that the Babylon app, which bears the NHS logo and uses artificial intelligence (AI) to identify health problems, diagnosed a 60-year-old female smoker who reports sudden onset chest pain and nausea with a panic attack or inflammation, whereas 60-year-old male smoker was diagnosed with a heart attack.

He was named by The Times among the 100 global people to watch in 2012, and by the Health Service Journal among the 100 most influential people in UK healthcare.

In June 2021 it was announced that Babylon was planning to list on the NYSE at a $US4.2 billion dollar valuation.

In October 2021, Parsa led Babylon into floating on the NYSE, later calling his decision an "unbelievable, unmitigated disaster" after the share price collapsed from $272.50 at flotation to below $1. Parsa's salary on 31 December 2022 was USD 667,340.

On 28 June 2023, Babylon announced it would delist from the NYSE, transfer "core operating subsidiaries of the Company" to MindMaze SA, and stated it "will not provide for any payment to the Company’s Class A ordinary shareholders or other equity instrument holders, as AlbaCore will be exercising rights under its debt agreements with the Company to transition the go-forward business by transferring core operating subsidiaries of the Company to MindMaze". However, on 7 August 2023, Babylon announced that the transaction "would not proceed" and that "Babylon is exiting its core US business".

On 11 August 2023, Forbes reported Babylon is “winding down” its business in Rwanda, potentially disrupting care for 2.8 million people.

On 15 August 2023, Babylon announced that they would also be liquidating in the US within a Chapter 7 bankruptcy liquidation.

On 19 September 2023, the UK operation filed for bankruptcy, and disclosed the sale of its operation to eMed for $620,000 (£500,000).

== Personal life ==
Parsa is married to a Canadian former banker, Mairi Johnson, with whom he has three children.
