= Student Publication Association =

Student Publication Association (SPA)
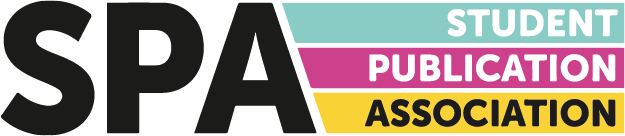
- Formation: 2012
- Type: Charity
- Purpose: To promote and support student journalism
- Headquarters: London
- Location: United Kingdom
- Region served: UK and Ireland
- Members: 200 Member Publications
- Chair: Emily Pitt-Shaw
- Website: SPAJournalism.com

The Student Publication Association (SPA) is a national body for student newspapers and magazines in the United Kingdom and the Republic of Ireland. The SPA aims to provide support and training for student journalists, encourage best practice, and recognise success.

It is a non-profit body run by a team of 26 volunteers, with six elected committee members, eight appointed regional officers, and up to eight trustees. Currently it has more than 200 member publications across the two countries.

The association was formed in 2012 and holds an annual national conference and awards ceremony for student journalists, as well as other various initiatives throughout the year.

In 2020, the SPA was entered onto the register of charities as a Charitable Incorporated Organisation.

== Governing Structure ==
The organisation is made up of five elected committee members, who are usually students or recent graduates. The team for 2026/27 is as follows:

- Chair: Emily Pitt-Shaw
- Communications Officer: Anna Boyne
- Conference & Events Officer: Oisín McGilloway
- Training & Opportunities Officer: Abbie Brown
- Sponsorship Officer: Jacob Robinson
- Membership Officer: Jack Walsh

The executive committee is supported by a team of eight regional officers and overseen by a trustee board of established journalists, some of whom are elected and some appointed. The current trustee board is as follows:

- Jem Collins
- Aubrey Allegretti
- Geraldine Scott
- Anttoni James Numminen
- Ollie Cole
- Emma Penney
- James Mole
- Temi Alanamu

== National Awards ==
The Student Publication Association runs a national awards scheme for students in the UK and Republic of Ireland, which been in place since 2013. Since the closure of the Guardian Student Media Awards in 2016 the awards have become the only full set of journalism awards for students in the UK. They are judged by professional journalists across the industry and in 2024, a record 1246 entries were received.

== #SPANC ==
In addition to a number of smaller regional conferences, the organisation holds an annual national conference during the Easter holidays. The conference is held across three days at a UK university, and features talks and workshops from professional journalists, as well as the annual SPA Awards presentation evening. Currently, the conference has been held in:

- Southampton (2013)
- Nottingham Trent (2014)
- Southampton (2015)
- Loughborough (2016)
- Leeds (2017)
- Cardiff (2018)
- York (2019)
- Online (2020)
- Online (2021)
- Sheffield (2022)
- Glasgow (2023)
- Bristol (2024)
- Exeter (2025)
- Norwich (2026)

== See also ==
- Canadian University Press
- Associated Collegiate Press
