= Circle Health Group =

British private healthcare provider

- Type: Private
- Founded: 2004; 22 years ago
- Headquarters: London, United Kingdom
- Area served: UK and China
- Key people: Paolo Pieri (CEO); Paul Manning (Chief Medical Officer); Henry Davis (CFO)
- Owner: PureHealth (2024–present)
- Number of employees: 8,600
- Website: www.circlehealthgroup.co.uk

Circle Health Group is a private healthcare provider in the United Kingdom, and is the country's biggest private hospital provider. The company was founded in 2004 and rebranded as Circle Health Group in 2019 after acquiring a rival, BMI Healthcare; in the same year it began an expansion in China. In 2023 the company was acquired by PureHealth, an Abu Dhabi-based holding company.

Circle Health ran an independent sector treatment centre delivering dermatology services in Nottingham from 2008 until 2019, when operation of the services was returned to Nottingham University Hospitals NHS Trust. The services during the period in which they were run by Circle Health were described as an "unmitigated disaster" in an independent report commissioned by the local clinical commissioning group which ran health services in the county.

In November 2011 the company was awarded a contract to run Hinchingbrooke Hospital in Cambridgeshire, the first NHS England hospital to be operated by a private company. Circle Health withdrew from the hospital, three years into the ten-year contract, shortly after being severely criticised by the Care Quality Commission (CQC) over standards of care and hygiene. The CQC report indicated that "Medical services were inadequate because we found poor emotional and physical care which was not safe or caring. This was not reported by leaders of the service to the trust management therefore we judged the leadership to be inadequate." It was the worst rating for 'caring' that the CQC had ever given. Circle Health left the hospital with a £14 million deficit that, because Circle had limited its liability to £5 million, the taxpayer had to pay for.

== History ==
Circle was founded in 2004 as Centres Of Clinical Excellence Limited, co-founded in 2004 by Babylon Health founder and former investment banker Ali Parsa and consultant ophthalmologist Massoud Fouladi. It said that it wanted to be a model "a little bit like John Lewis" or a law firm, and referred to itself as a "partnership". The flattened organisational structure was said to allow quality and efficiency to remain high, through the creation of "clinical units". In January 2010, Gordon Brown, as Prime Minister, said: "Circle's provision of healthcare from the private sector is crucial to a 21st century health service."

The company's plans were ambitious, involving opening 30 private hospitals, and encompassing the possibility of running 30 NHS trusts in time. In October 2009 it was shortlisted to become the first franchisee of an NHS trust. It raised £200 million from investors and had an initial public offering on AIM, with the shares peaking at £2.

In 2015, Circle entered a £50M deal with Tech Mahindra to improve IT infrastructure and applications.

In October 2015, Circle entered an agreement with Advanced Oncotherapy to open a proton beam therapy cancer centre on Harley Street, London.

In April 2017, work began on a third private hospital, in Birmingham.

As Circle Integrated Care, it has had a prime provider contract to manage musculoskeletal services in Bedfordshire since 2014 and a £74M deal to oversee musculoskeletal services in Greenwich began in April 2017.

The company announced in December 2012, that Ali Parsa had stepped down as chief executive. Steve Melton assumed the position until November 2016. Paolo Pieri, a former finance director of lastminute.com, is now chief executive.

=== Expansion ===
In November 2016, Circle announced that it is it to develop hospitals in China in conjunction with Chinese investors. In April 2019, it opened a £23m hospital in Shanghai. The hospital provides access to multi-disciplinary teams including specialists outside China.

In November 2019, the Financial Times reported that Circle would acquire the holding company of BMI Healthcare, the biggest private hospital provider in the UK with 54 hospitals; the cost of the acquisition was not disclosed. The deal was called in by the Competition and Markets Authority in December 2019, resulting in the enlarged company agreeing in June 2020 to divest Circle's hospital near Bath and the new hospital at Birmingham, which had not at that time been put into operation.

== Corporate structure ==
=== Private ownership ===
In 2017, the company was taken private by Toscafund Asset Management and its affiliate Penta Capital. Previously, the company had been listed on the Alternative Investment Market. Its initial public offering in June 2011 which raised £45M had valued the company at £95.4M. In June 2012 it raised £47.5M through a placing of shares with institutional investors. In December 2013, the company secured £25M of new funding and overhauled its corporate structure to grant its employees and NHS staff working at its sites direct access to its publicly traded shares.

During its time on AIM, as Circle Holdings, investors included Odey Asset Management, Lansdowne Partners, Balderton Capital, BlackRock, Invesco Perpetual, BlueCrest Capital Management and Toscafund Asset Management.

In March 2017, Toscafund proposed to buy all the company shares, valuing the company at £74M.

Circle reported that "the underlying performance of the group improved considerably during 2018", making an EBITDAR profit of £12.3M, up from £6.7M the year before, although the company had an overall loss of £11M as a result of "exceptional costs ... relating to the impairment of intangible assets and goodwill".

In December 2019, the company acquired its larger rival BMI Healthcare to form the biggest private hospital provider in the UK, which it rebranded as Circle Health Group. The combined group had annual revenues of almost £1 billion. As part of the acquisition, American healthcare company Centene (through its subsidiary MH Services) took a 40% stake in Circle Health Holdings. Centene gained full ownership in July 2021.

In August 2023, it was reported that Circle Health Group would be acquired by PureHealth, an Abu Dhabi-based holding company and healthcare platform, in a deal valued at $1.2 billion. In January 2024, it was announced that this transaction had been completed.

=== Employee ownership until 2017 ===
Initially, the company operated an equity incentive program under which doctors were offered equity in the company in return for a share of the consultants' private work, which was said to be "pivotal in raising capital from third party debt and equity investors". Circle employees were offered shares in the company for free, providing they met performance criteria. Consultant and staff ownership reduced to 25% after paying off £257M in borrowings in 2013, and those shares were bought in 2017 by Toscafund and Penta Capital.

In 2014, Circle won "Employee-Owned Business of the Year" at the Employee Ownership Association Philip Baxendale awards, while a report by the All-Party Parliamentary Group on Employee Ownership referenced "impressive" productivity statistics from Circle but noted that "the argument that these successes derive not from the ownership model, but from an engaged workforce".

Speaking at Hinchingbrooke hospital, Francis Maude, the Cabinet Office Minister, described the Circle model as "a third option which goes beyond the monopoly of state provision or the private sector". The journalist Nigel Hawkes' description of Circle as "a John Lewis-style social enterprise co-owned by its employees" was described by Prof Martin McKee as nonsense. McKee pointed out that "staff shares amount to only 49% of the total number of shares, and the staff's decision-making powers are far less than even this suggests".

However, the Nuffield Trust found "the company's participative management style – based on devolving power and responsibility to the frontline – [to be] important in terms of motivating staff", while the King's Fund found that Circle was "developing the leadership skills and technical expertise for staff to test and implement service change".

== Centres ==
=== Circle Bath ===
A private hospital designed by Foster and Partners that opened in 2010 at Peasedown St John, near Bath. In 2017, Circle Bath received a rating of Good from the CQC, and won a Wylde IA Happiest Workplace in the South West competition. Following the agreement with the Competition and Markets Authority, the hospital was bought by the NHS in June 2021, and became a subsidiary of Bath's Royal United Hospital under a new name – Sulis Hospital.

=== Circle Reading ===
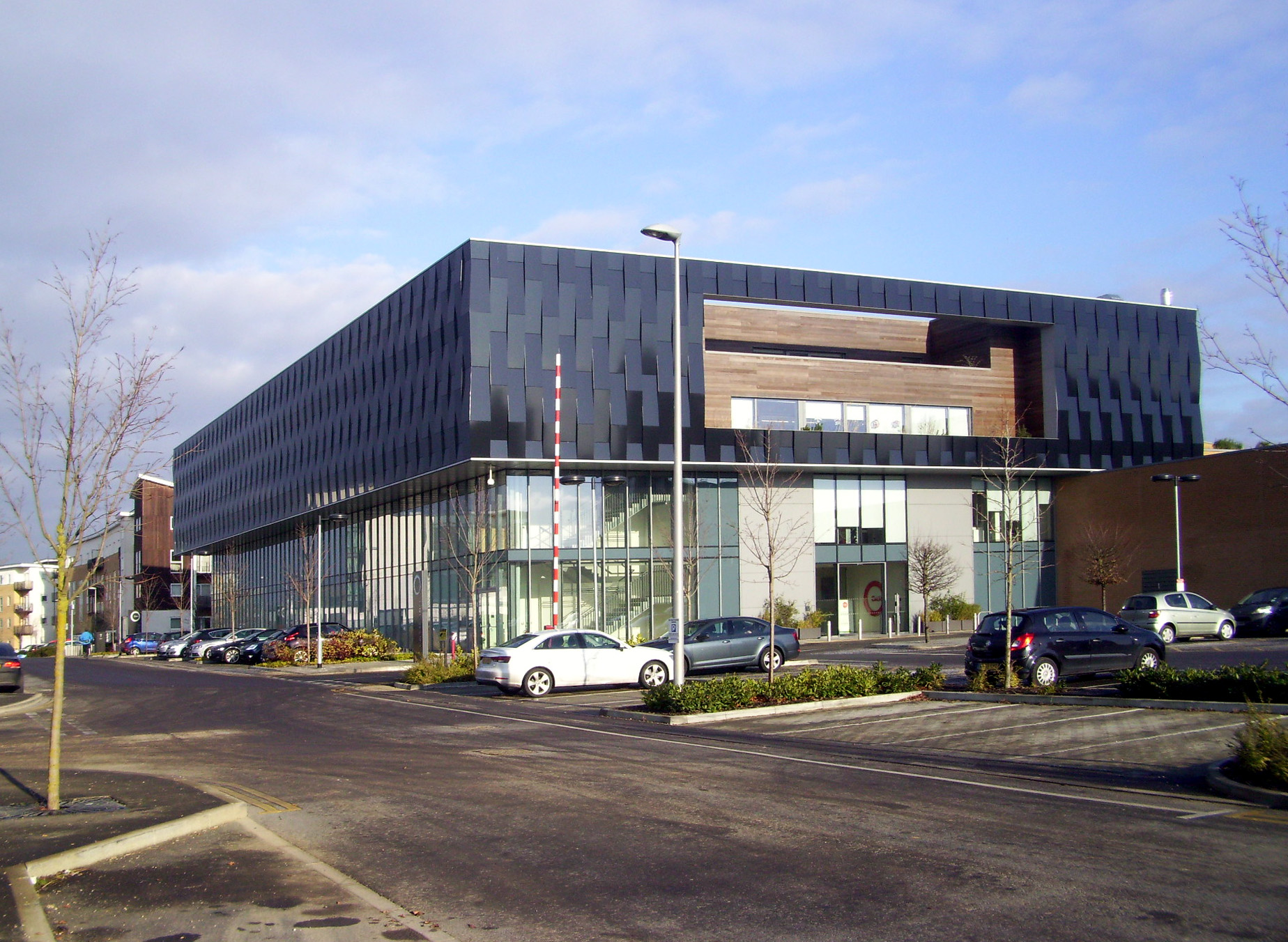
Circle Reading

A private hospital that opened in August 2012 at Kennet Island, Reading. Circle Reading has a 2019 rating of Good from the CQC.

=== Circle Birmingham ===
In 2017, Circle began construction of a private hospital at Edgbaston, Birmingham, on part of the site of the former BBC Pebble Mill studios, and financed through an arrangement with American real estate investment trust Medical Properties Trust. At a reported cost of £50M, its 120 rehabilitation beds were expected to create 250 jobs. Opening of the facility was delayed by the COVID-19 pandemic, and it was not yet operational when Circle agreed in 2020 to divest it as a condition of the acquisition of the BMI hospitals.

=== Nottingham NHS Treatment Centre ===
This was opened as the largest independent sector treatment centre in Britain, as part of a programme of reforms to the NHS which aimed at introducing choice by increasing the diversification of providers. It was operated by Circle between 2008 and 2019. In 2010, the centre was visited by Andrew Lansley, who said: "The fundamental thing is, is it providing a good care to patients on the basis of NHS principles? Yes it is." It reportedly made a profit of £4M in the six-month period to 30 June 2013, up from £2.5M for the same period the previous year. In 2013, when Circle's five-year contract expired, commissioners decided to reconfigure services in the area.

Circle had run outpatient dermatology services for the Nottingham area since 2008, with a mix of staff seconded from Nottingham University Hospitals NHS Trust and those directly employed. Circle's contract was renewed but the dermatology services were redesigned by Rushcliffe Clinical Commissioning Group, on behalf of all the Nottinghamshire commissioners, "based on its own specification".

In December 2014, it was announced that six of the eight consultants had left rather than transfer to Circle, while recruitment and retention was a problem for NHS hospitals across the East Midlands. David Eady, President of the British Association of Dermatologists, described dermatology nationally as "a specialty in crisis" and that "no single region in Britain has enough consultants" to meet Royal College of Physicians recommendations, which meant Circle replaced them initially with locum doctors, for whom Circle had to pay nearly £300,000 per year per consultant.

In 2015, the operation of dermatology services during the period in which they were run by Circle Health was described as an "unmitigated disaster" in an independent report commissioned by the CCG and undertaken by Dr Chris Clough of Kings College Hospital, London. The British Association of Dermatologists stated that it was "very concerned by the decline of services in Nottingham from a centre of excellence to somewhere now unable to offer expert dermatology, dermatological care for patients... and now its failure to deliver teaching to trainees and medical students". An inspection by the CQC in January 2015 had rated the centre as 'good' overall, although the termination of pregnancy service required improvement; a follow-up inspection in May 2016 rated that service as 'good'.

In 2018, local commissioners extended Circle's contract after a legal challenge. The following year the centre, which has 700 staff and treats around 250,000 patients annually, was taken over by Nottingham University Hospitals NHS Trust.

=== Circle Clinic Stratford ===
This clinic attached to a GP practice in Stratford-upon-Avon was run by Circle Clinics Limited, but in June 2014 it was announced that SWFT Clinical Services, a subsidiary of South Warwickshire NHS Foundation Trust, was to take it over as Circle had stopped providing services at the clinic in April to focus on inpatient services.

=== Hinchingbrooke Hospital ===
In November 2011, Circle won a ten-year contract to run the struggling NHS Hinchingbrooke Hospital in Cambridgeshire. The hospital's buildings and staff remained part of the NHS, while Circle took over all day-to-day management responsibilities. Dr Stephen Dunn, director of policy and strategy at NHS Midlands and East, described it as "a good solution, focused on local needs." In an opinion piece for The Guardian, he said that "Without this deal, services might have been cut, the hospital might have had to close, or an £80M subsidy might have been needed to support the existing management." The contract began in February 2012.

Within six months, the hospital deficit had risen to £4.1 million, £2.2 million higher than Circle's financial plan. In a 2012 national survey of NHS patients, Hinchingbrooke Hospital came first for patient satisfaction. The Prime Minister's former special advisor on health commented in the Daily Telegraph that these results, along with improved care and reduced waiting times, had shown "the right kind of reform can turn around shoddy government monopolies and transform them into huge success stories". However, during 2012 losses doubled, and Circle obtained a £4M advance on fees to ease cash flow problems at the hospital. For the Conservative Party this was seen as a test case for private sector contracting.

After it appeared that Hinchingbrooke hospital had attracted some orthopaedic surgery from Addenbrookes Hospital, Circle stated that they would like to bid for more NHS contracts.

In November 2012, a National Audit Office (NAO) report into the franchise was published, noting the £4.1 million deficit. It found that while Circle had made early improvements in some clinical areas, Circle would have to generate unprecedented levels of savings to pay the deficit and most of the savings were expected in the later years of the ten-year franchise, so the value for money of the project could not easily be assessed for some time. The NAO found that while NHS East of England had assessed bidders' savings proposals, the relative risks had not been fully considered, which had the potential to encourage over-optimistic bids.

Matters started to deteriorate further. In the 2013 NHS staff survey involving 28 key findings, Hinchingbrooke came out worse than the NHS average on two-thirds of the findings (19 of them), and was in the lowest 20% of trusts in almost half of the findings (13 of them). In February 2013 The Health Service Journal reported that senior health figures were questioning the viability of using the model more widely in hospitals. They cited austerity and the need to reduce activity in hospitals as key drivers.

In December 2013, the company announced that it expected its Hinchingbrooke contract to finish at or near break-even by the end of its financial year. The Care Quality Commission had inspected the hospital and were satisfied. Waiting times in the A&E department were reported to be among the best in England and Dr Foster revealed the hospital has a "statistically significant low mortality rate"

In April 2014, it was reported that the hospital was likely to record a deficit in the region of £600,000 to £700,000 for the year ending 31 March 2014 and in July 2014 Hinchingbrooke Hospital was referred to the Secretary of State for Health for failure to meet their statutory duty to break-even financially.

The hospital made an offer in September 2014 to pay local GPs a £50 'administrative fee' for surgery referrals in an email, signed by Hinchingbrooke chief executive Hisham Abdel-Rahman, which was rapidly withdrawn when the company was accused of bribery.

A visit by inspectors from the CQC in the same month highlighted severe issues with patient care: inspectors observed that "staff treat patients in an undignified and emotionally abusive manner" and they spoke to patients who had been "told to soil themselves".

In November 2014 the chief financial officer left. UNISON called for Circle to be 'sacked', noting that papers tabled for the Board meeting in October – which did not include a financial report – showed the organisation faced (i) potential penalties of up to £200,000 per month for failure to meet targets for patients waiting longer than four hours in the accident and emergency department (ii) potential penalties for failing to reach electronic discharge summary targets which already stood at £138,000 and (iii) potential penalties of a further £150,000 for failing to increase the number of patients discharged at weekends. The union said staff turnover was more than 13 per cent.

In January 2015, Circle announced that because Hinchingbrooke Hospital was "no longer [financially] viable under current terms" it wanted to withdraw from operating the hospital under the exit terms of the ten-year contract. Later the same day, the CQC recommended the trust be placed into special measures after it was rated "inadequate" on the questions of whether it was caring, safe and well led.

The report was critical of standards of care and hygiene, indicating that "Medical services were inadequate because we found poor emotional and physical care which was not safe or caring. This was not reported by leaders of the service to the trust management therefore we judged the leadership to be inadequate." It was the worst rating for 'caring' that the CQC had ever given. The hospital's chief executive challenged 285 facts in the report, 60 of which were found to be duplicates or non-applicable, 48 of which were partially upheld and 111 of which were upheld. CQC accepted that it had made the errors in its report, but pointed out that none of them were of substance to their findings. None of the factual changes agreed by CQC in response to the comments from the Trust were sufficient to lead to a change in the ratings at the subsequent CQC National Quality Assurance Group.

They had concerns about the trust's leadership because both the Circle management team and the trust board said that the other was responsible for holding the trust's executive team to account. Circle's chief executive Steve Melton said before the report was published: "We understand their report will be published soon, and fully expect it to be unbalanced and to disagree with many of its conclusions".

Just six weeks before it was due to be handed back to the public sector, the hospital asked for a government bailout of nearly £10 million. As Circle Health had negotiated a deal to limit their losses to £5 million, which had already been reached, it was not liable for the expected deficit. The taxpayer therefore had to pay for the deficit following the failed privatisation, which was found to be £14 million at the end of the 2014-15 financial year.

The period in which Circle was operating the hospital was described as "a disaster" by the GMB union. The then chairman of the British Medical Association remarked that "What has happened in Hinchingbrooke shows that the responsibility of running a critical public service can never be handed over, and so the insistence on private providers as a potential solution to problems facing Hinchingbrooke was always misguided."

=== Woodlands Hospital ===
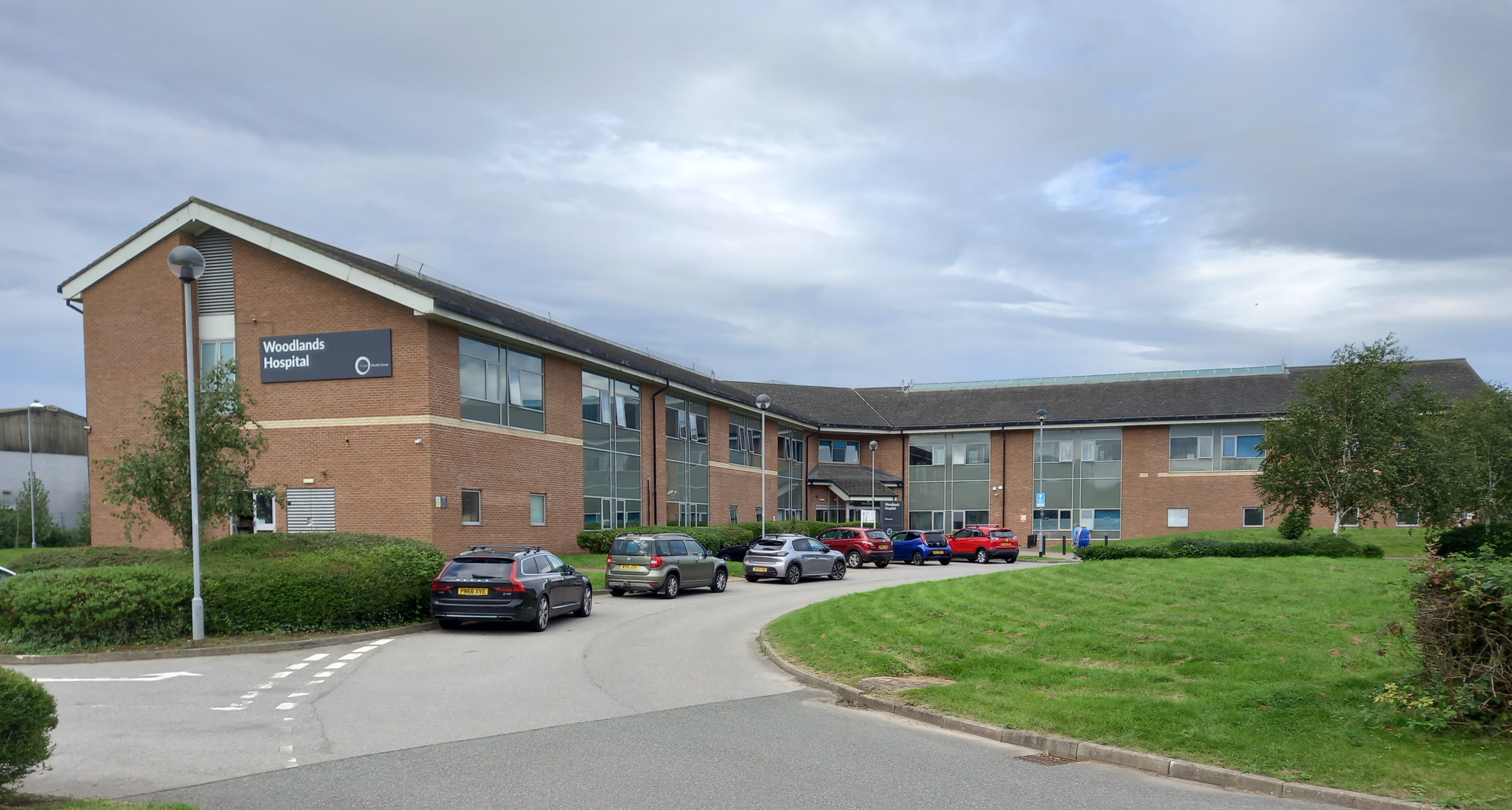
Woodlands Hospital, Darlington

Circle operates the Woodlands Hospital in Darlington, County Durham. It was built in 2001 and Circle has run the hospital since the acquisition of BMI Healthcare in late 2019.

== Awards ==
In 2017, an initiative by a rhematology specialist then employed at a Circle treatment centre won The Prince of Wales' Integrated Approaches to Care Nursing Times Award, and in 2018, Circle won Best Healthcare Provider to the NHS at the Health Service Journal Partnership Awards.

== See also ==
- Private medicine in the United Kingdom
