= Rare FM =

Student radio station of University College London

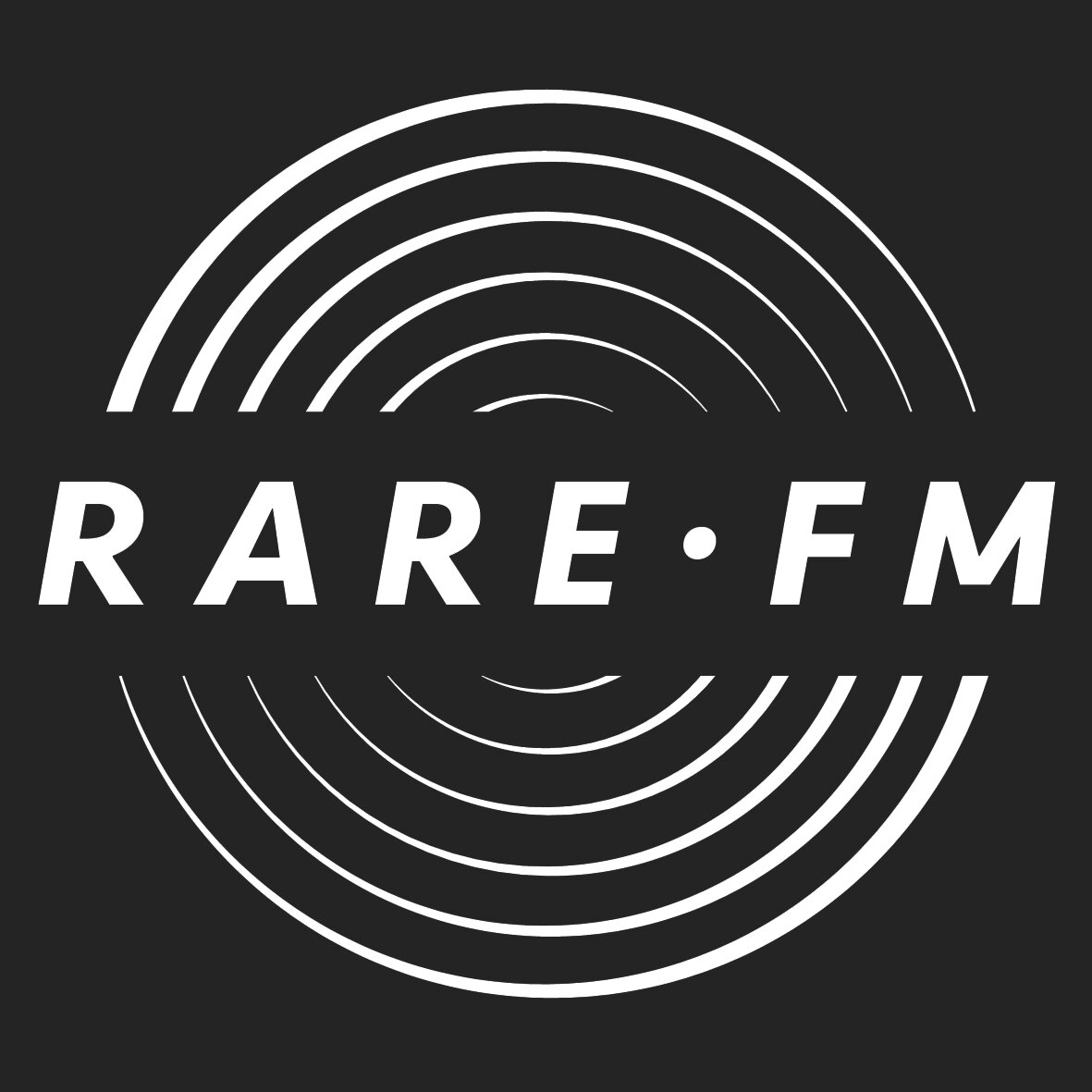
- Current Rare FM logo
- London; England
- Branding: Student Radio

Programming
- Format: Music (various genres) and talk
- Affiliations: University College London; Student Radio Association

Ownership
- Owner: UCL Union

Technical information
- Repeater: Central London: 9 months a year on 87.7 FM

Links
- Website: rarefm.co.uk

Rare FM is the student radio station of University College London.

== Background ==
Rare FM was set up in 1998 as an affiliated society of UCL Union. It was primarily set up by Edward Jackson. Rare FM broadcasts continuously over the Internet with approximately 15 hours of live original programming, starting at 9:00 a.m. and finishing at 12:00 midnight from.

Rare FM has started to provide some content via podcast which is published through Anchor to Spotify and Apple Podcasts among other locations. Rare FM now broadcasts a published schedule of shows from November to June between the hours of 09:00 to 00:00. When not broadcasting set shows, the station plays a curated playlist.

Rare FM has moved home over the last two years in a process overseen by the 2021-23 president, treasurer and studio manager: Yiannis Goeldner-Thompson, Dan Amery and Jack Ward respectively. The new studio has been fully upgraded with broadcasting and mixing equipment.

Rare FM also hosts several club nights throughout the year at venues such as The Cause and The Pickle Factory. From 2022-23 these are overseen by Louis Miller, the station's Head of Events.

Rare FM also promotes its music based journalism magazine and online platform, Under City Lights, which goes to print annually.

FM Broadcast History:

Year	Date
1998	27 September - 24 October (4 weeks), from BBC Swain's Lane
2000	2 November - 29 November (4 weeks)
2004	1 February - 28 February (4 weeks)
2005	23 September - 5 October (UCL Fresher's Week)
2006	No FM broadcast
2007	6 March - 19 March
2008	4 March - 18 March
2009	No FM broadcast due to lack of available frequencies
2010	1 November - End of the academic year
2011	1 November - End of the academic year
2012	1 November - End of the academic year
2013	1 November - End of the academic year
2014	1 November - End of the academic year
2015	1 November - End of the academic year
2016	1 November - End of the academic year
2017	1 November - End of the academic year
2018	1 November - End of the academic year
2019	1 December - March
2020	1 November - End of the academic year
2021	1 November - End of the academic year
2022	1 November - End of the academic year

Rare FM DJs also broadcast live at UCL and UCL Union events, such as the Freshers' Fayre and the Summer Arts Festival.

== Content ==
Rare FM is primarily a music station, which in past tended to focus on indie/alternative music. However, in recent years this focus has dwindled and a diversity of genres and interests is now widely catered to. Shows specialising in Funk, Soul, Disco, Jazz, Blues, House, Electro, Hip hop, DnB, Dubstep, Grime, Psytrance, Dancehall and Reggae all now feature on a schedule that of 2008 amasses over 130 DJs with a vast variety of tastes. Rare FM also broadcasts the weekly Student Radio Association chart show each Sunday.

== Broadcasts ==
=== Broadcasts in 2020 ===
Rare FM for the first time since its formation, changed broadcast location, choosing to broadcast from presenter's homes through Mixlr whilst the UK continued to inflicted by the Covid-19 pandemic. The station now hosts 90 different shows with over 150 current members.

=== Events ===
Rare FM regularly puts on events which fill some of London's largest nightclub venues. From 2020-2023, this has included The Cause, Corsica Studios and Pickle Factory. Rare FM members including president from 2021-2023, Yiannis Goeldner-Thompson, Ibra Ali and Rob Norris also played at the Seaside Beano Festival with The Cause in June 2022.

== Station alumni ==
- Aliza Ayaz - Pakistan City FM89 RJ
- Alex Zane - DJ in 1999-2000 (with weekly show It's Alex Zane!), went on to be a presenter for XFM, MTV and Channel 4 where he hosted Popworld.

== See also ==
- Student Radio Association
