= Netcare =

South African health care company

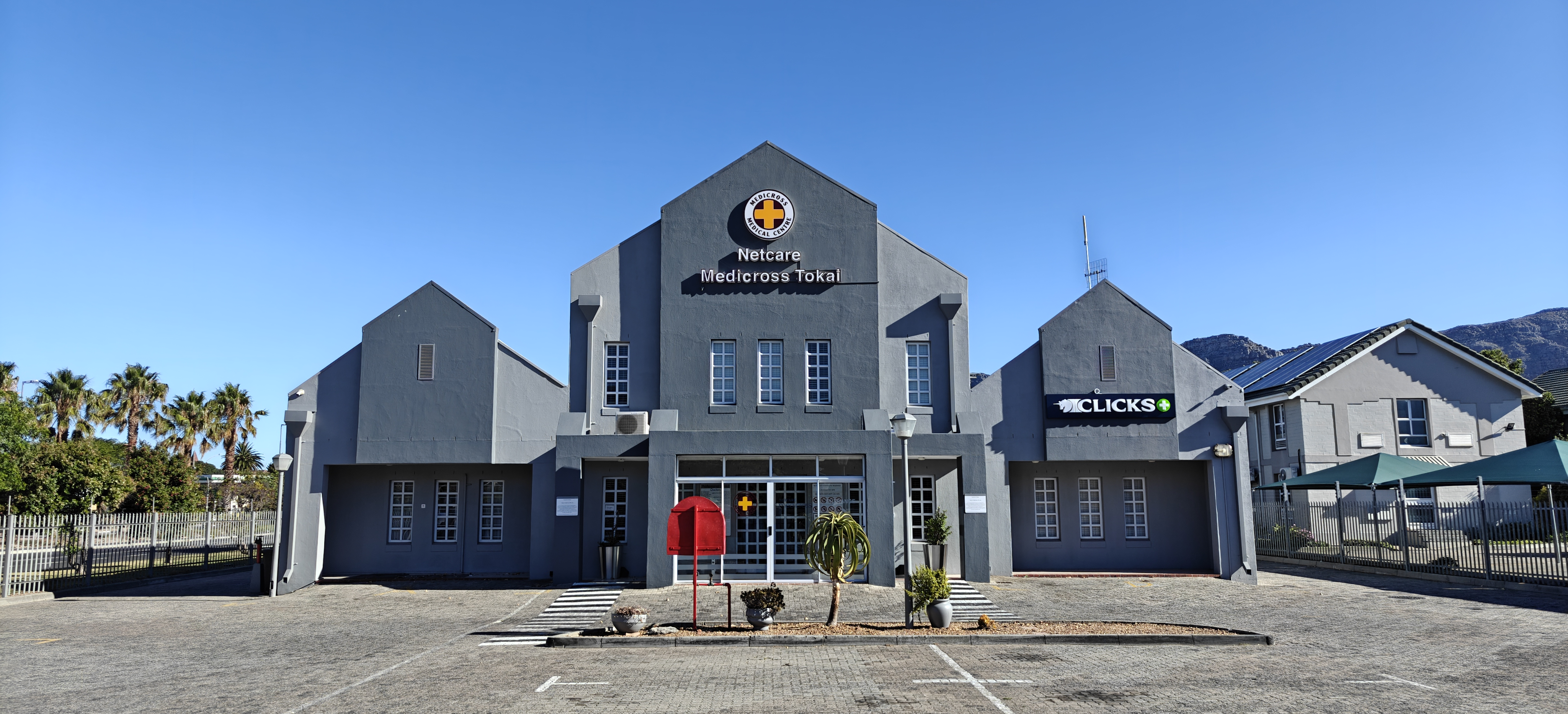
- Netcare Medicross Tokai private clinic in Tokai, Cape Town
- Type: Public
- Traded as: JSE: NTC
- ISIN: ZAE000011953
- Industry: Healthcare
- Founded: 1996; 30 years ago
- Headquarters: Sandton, Johannesburg, South Africa
- Number of locations: 124 (2025)
- Area served: South Africa
- Key people: Alex Maditse (Chairman); Richard Friedland (CEO)
- Services: Hospital- and clinic-related services Primary healthcare Emergency medical services Medical insurance Gap cover
- Revenue: ▲ R 25.202 billion (2024)
- Net income: ▲ R 1.547 billion (2024)
- Total assets: ▲ R 28.391 billion (2024)
- Total equity: ▲ R 28.391 billion (2024)
- Number of employees: 18,000 + (2024)
- Subsidiaries: Netcare Hospitals; Netcare Cancer Care; Netcare 911; Netcare Medicross; Netcare Akeso; Netcare Renal Care
- Website: https://www.netcare.co.za

Netcare, officially Netcare Group Limited, is a South African private healthcare company.

The group provides a range of medical services across the healthcare spectrum, and operates South Africa's largest network of private hospitals.

The company also provides emergency medical services (including through its 082 911 emergency line and Netcare app), primary healthcare, renal dialysis, maternity care, prepaid health cover, gap cover (medical cost shortfall insurance), and mental health services.

== History ==
Netcare was established in 1996, and was listed on the JSE Limited (Johannesburg Stock Exchange) the same year. The company expanded into the United Kingdom in 2001.

In 2002 it won The Ophthalmic Chain contract in Kent, Merseyside, Cumbria, Lancashire, Hampshire, and Thames Valley, to carry out 44,500 cataract removals over a 5-year period and the £2.5bn contract for the Greater Manchester Surgical Centre, a 48-bed facility at Trafford General Hospital to provide 44,863 elective procedures over 5 years with a diagnostics programme valued at £1bn.

In 2004 it signed a contract to carry out 41,600 cataract operations for the NHS at sites throughout the UK including Cumberland Infirmary.

The company acquired a controlling stake in General Healthcare Group, the UK's largest private hospital group with 50 hospitals, in 2006 for £2.2 billion. This brought Netcare's total number of hospitals to 120 with over 11,000 beds, 510 operating theatres, and 37 pharmacies.

GHG had a subsidiary - Amicus Health - which tendered for contracts for the UK's National Health Service (NHS). It had contracts with Stracathro Hospital for 8000 episodes of elective surgery in orthopaedics, urology, general surgery and gastroenterology from 2006 to 2009.

Netcare used Vanguard Healthcare mobile units to treat NHS cataract patients across the UK. The mobile cataract units in Cumbria had failure rates 6 times that of local NHS facilities.

In 2019, Netcare partnered with Founders Factory Africa, selecting 35 African health-tech startups for an acceleration and incubation program. Accelerated startups will receive a £30,000 cash investment (≈$38,000) and £220,000 in support services from Founders Factory Africa.

Incubator health-tech ventures will receive £60K cash and £100K toward support. Founders Factory Africa and Netcare will share a 5 to 10 percent equity stake in each startup accepted into the program.

== Operations ==
Netcare provides private healthcare services at 49 Netcare hospitals, 55 Netcare medicross clinics, 5 prime cure medical centers, and 15 Netcare akeso psychiatric facilities.

Netcare is also a private trainer of nursing and emergency medical personnel through Netcare Education's Faculty of Nursing and Ancillary Healthcare (FNAH) and Faculty of Emergency and Critical Care (FEEC). FNAH provides education and training at five campuses and FECC at two campuses.
