= Iranians in the United Kingdom =

Iranian citizens and nationals of the United Kingdom

British people of Iranian descent ایرانیان بریتانیا
ایرانیان بریتانیا

Total population
- Iranian-born residents in the United Kingdom: 114,432 (2021/22 census) (Note: Does not include ethnic Iranians born in the United Kingdom or those with Iranian ancestry); England: 106,801 (2021); Scotland: 4,803 (2022); Wales: 2,367 (2021); Northern Ireland: 461 (2021); Previous estimates: 42,494 (2001 census); 84,735 (2011 census); 70,000 (2017 ONS estimate)

Regions with significant populations
- London, Manchester, Liverpool

Languages
- British English, Persian, Azerbaijani, Armenian, Kurdish

Religion
- Shia Islam, Non-religion, Christianity, Judaism, Baháʼí, Sunni Islam, Zoroastrianism, Other.

Related ethnic groups
- Iranian diaspora (Iranians in the UAE • Ajam of Bahrain • Ajam of Qatar • Ajam of Iraq • Ajam of Kuwait • Iranians in Canada • Iranians in the US • Iranians in the UK • Iranians in Germany • Iranians in Israel • Iranians in Turkey) Iranian peoples (Lurs, Achomis, Baluchs, Kurds, Iranian Azeris), Turkic peoples (Qashqai, Azerbaijanis), Huwala

Iranians in the United Kingdom consist of people of Iranian nationality who have settled in the United Kingdom, as well as British residents and citizens of Iranian heritage. Iranians in the United Kingdom are referred to by hyphenated terms such as British-Iranians, British-Persians, Iranian-Britons, or Persian-Britons.

As of the 2021 United Kingdom census, the British-Iranian population was approximately 114,432 people. The vast majority of British-Iranians arrived after the Islamic Revolution of 1979, with an estimated 8,000 Iranian asylum seekers arriving in the United Kingdom in the following five years. Due to intensifying religious and political persecution, particularly of Iranian Christians, the numbers of Iranian asylum seekers arriving at UK soil has significantly risen in the last decade.

== History ==
The first known Iranian immigrant to UK who became a British citizen was Assadour Karabegof (Persian: آسادور قرابگوف), who was naturalised on 20 February 1862. Also, there was another Iranian called Arsen Oskian Arsenian (Persian: آرسن اوسکیان آرسنیان) who was naturalised on 30 May 1868.

The vast majority of Iranians in the UK arrived after the Iranian Revolution of 1979. In the following five years, an estimated 8,000 Iranian asylum seekers arrived in the country. The 1981 census showed 28,617 persons born in Iran (18,132 men, 10,485 women). Iranians were not separately distinguished in the 1991 census. The 2001 census recorded 42,494 persons born in Iran. In the 2011 census, 79,985 Iranian-born people were recorded in England, 1,695 in Wales, 2,773 in Scotland and 282 in Northern Ireland. The Office for National Statistics estimates that, in 2017, 70,000 Iranian-born people were living in the UK. In 2004, the Iranian embassy in London estimated that as many as 75,000 Iranians might reside in the country. Most adults are themselves immigrants; the second generation are quite young, and so there are relatively few adults of Iranian background born and raised in the UK.

In the six-year period between 2018 and 2023, 21,565 Iranian nationals entered the United Kingdom by crossing the English Channel using small boats – the most common nationality of all small boat arrivals.

== Religion ==
Iran is a primarily Shia Muslim country with Jewish, Baháʼí, Christian and Zoroastrian communities, a fact reflected in the migrant population in the UK. However, there is an increasing number of Iranian atheists and agnostics. Some Iranians in the UK have converted from Shi'ism to various sects of Christianity. There are also active Jewish and Christian communities among British Iranians.

Religion of Iranian Born - England and Wales
Religion	Census 2021	
Religion	Number	%
Islam	36,503	33.6%
No religion	33,935	31.2%
Christianity	21,427	19.7%
Other Religions	3,099	2.85%
Judaism	569	0.52%
Buddhism	91	0.1%
Sikhism	74	0.1%
Hinduism	51	0.0%
Not Stated	13,419	12.4%
Total	108648	100%

== See also ==
- List of British Iranians
- Iranian diaspora
- Iran–United Kingdom relations
