= List of online marketplaces =

This is a non-exhaustive list of online marketplaces.

Name	Location	Industry	Year Launched	Total Financing ($)	Business Model	# of Service Professionals	Global Alexa page ranking
Airbnb	San Francisco, CA, US	Home rental	2008		Fees charged to home owners; Fees charged to renter		358
AliExpress	Hangzhou, China	Consumer products	2010				
Amazon Marketplace	Seattle, WA, US	Consumer, business, and industrial products	1999		Fees charged to sellers		10
Amazon.com Home Services	Seattle, WA, US	Home services	2014		10-15% of the project value		10
As seen on TV	Clearwater, FL, US	Consumer Products	2015		5-20%		16,536
Avvo	Seattle, WA, US	Legal services	2006	60,500,000	Premium subscription for attorneys.; Access to legal advice for consumers.	185,000	5,006
eBay	San Jose, CA, US	Any product	1995		10-15% fees to seller		41
Etsy	Brooklyn, NY, US	Consumer and hand made products	2005		Fees charged to sellers		168
Farmigo	Palo Alto, CA, US	Farm products	2009	26,000,000	35% mark-up	120	
Fiverr	Tel Aviv, Israel	Creative services	2010	110,000,000	Marketplace for creative digital services sold as Gigs. Millions of Gigs available from Sellers to Buyers.; Fiverr charges a flat 20% fee to the Seller.		398
Flipkart	India	Consumer Products	2007	7,700,000	B2C (business to consumer model)		105
Freeads.co.uk	UK	Online classifieds	1996		Fees for upgraded ads and featured placements		47,484
Freelancer	Sydney, Australia	Freelance marketplace, Online outsourcing, Employment website	2009				1,506
Freightos	Hong Kong	International freight	2012	50,000,000	SaaS-Enabled Marketplace model		130,130
Gumtree	London, UK	Online classifieds	2000		Buy, sell and wanted marketplace using both free and paid classifieds ads.; Fees to upgrade ad listing.	155,158	1,105
Gumroad	San Francisco, CA, US	Creative services	2011		Marketplace for creative digital services.; Gumroad charges a flat 10% fee to the Seller.		
Hipcamp	San Francisco, CA, US	Campground reservations	2013		Fees charged to campground owners; Fees charged to campers		
HomeAdvisor	Golden, CO, US	Home improvement	1999		Lead generation (for home improvement contractors)		5,908
Hum Mart	Karachi, Pakistan	Home Improvement	2018				398
Jetsuite	Irvine, CA, US	Private jet charter	2006		The company has steered away from advertising as an “air taxi” with shared rides and began focusing solely on private charter flights.		
Kijiji	Toronto, ON, Canada	Online classifieds	2005				
Maker's Row	US	Manufacturing	2012	1,000,000			
Momo.com	Taipei, Taiwan	Consumer products	2004				
Nettement Chic	France	Fashion	2012				
Openbay	Boston, MA, US	Automotive Repair and Maintenance Services	2012	8,000,000	Openbay+ automotive services subscription program for Openbay partner customers, paid by partner.		99,349
PakWheels	Lahore, Punjab, Pakistan	Car shoppers and sellers	2003				
Pinduoduo	Shanghai, China	Agriculture, general consumer products	2015				
Shein	Nanjing, China	Fast fashion	2008				
Shpock	Vienna, Austria	Local classifieds	2012				
Taskrabbit	San Francisco, CA, US	Small jobs	2008	37,700,000	Taskrabbit earns a commission on every transaction they broker.		19,840
Temu	China	Consumer products	2022				
Thumbtack	San Francisco, CA, US	Local services	2008	148,200,000	Charging service provider for increased access to leads	240,000	4,073
Udemy	Silicon Valley, CA, US	e-learning	2010		Marketplace for teachers to create and offer courses; Earns commission for s* Marketplace for teachers to create and offer coursestudents tuition fee		518
Upwork	Mountain View, CA, US	Freelancers	2015		Fees charged to contractors and employer		528
Vetster	Toronto, ON, Canada	Veterinary Telemedicine	2020		Fees charged to veterinarians and pet owners		
Dial A Vet	New South Wales, Australia	Veterinary Telemedicine	2022		Fees charged to veterinarians and pet owners		
Vinted	Vilnius, Lithuania	Used clothing and other products	2008				
Wish	Oakland, CA, US	Consumer products	2010				
Zocdoc	New York, NY, US	Medical care	2007	97,900,000	Subscription to scheduling system software		6,665
Hepsiburada	Istanbul, Turkey	Consumer and Business Products	2000				
Trendyol	Istanbul, Turkey	Consumer, originally primarily clothing and fashion	2010				
