= Electronic consultation =

Electronic consultation is an aspect of telemedicine which involves remote communication between patients and clinicians, or between clinicians and specialists.

E-consult was one of the earlier applications which primary care physicians could use to consult specialists. Teledermatology lent itself to this approach as pictures could be sent for examination in a specialist centre in a process analogous to the well-established treatment of pathological specimens. The widespread use of electronic health records is reducing the need for specialist applications of this kind. There is developing interest in the application of such techniques in mental health.

== Consultation applications ==
Getting an appointment with care specialists can be difficult. But electronic consultation has stepped in to provide medical diagnosis or evaluation that can be carried out over the phone. A healthcare provider can make a voice or video call to the patient, engage them with some test questions, analyze symptoms of ailments, treat and manage them. Improved technology has made electronic consultation easier, even for those who don't consider themselves computer savvy. Electronic consultation can be used through online platforms or mobile apps, requesting a virtual visit with doctors, practitioners, and therapists.

The patient arranges an interview, generally by video, with a clinician, generally a general practitioner:

- American Well
- Dial A Vet
- Doc+
- eConsult
- E-med
- GP at Hand
- HealthLinkBC
- LIVI
- Push Doctor
- Teladoc
- Zocdoc

== Symptom checkers ==
These let patients enter their symptoms into an application. A report may be generated and sent to a clinician. Triaging applications, such as used by NHS 111 advise on the urgency of the problem.

- Ada Health
- WebMD
- Your.MD

== See also ==
- Online doctor
- Remote therapy
