= Livi (company) =

Swedish online healthcare company

- Industry: Telehealth
- Founded: 2015
- Headquarters: Stockholm, Sweden
- Area served: United Kingdom, France
- Products: Video consultations, digital healthcare services
- Parent: Kry International AB

Livi is a digital healthcare service by Kry International AB, a Swedish online healthcare company based in Stockholm.

Kry International was established in 2015 and operates as Kry in Norway and Sweden. In France and the United Kingdom, it operates as Livi.

In 2019, Livi recruited former NHS England's chief digital officer Juliet Bauer as its UK managing director.

It launched a partnership with general practices in North West Surrey and with SSP Health in the North West of England to offer video consultations to patients in October 2018, an app based service similar to that offered by GP at Hand but done through their existing GP practice without having to re-register with a new one. The NICS GP Federation in North West Surrey is using it to run extended access clinics. It also offers a paid for, on-demand service via an app. It plans to make the service available nationally. It subcontracts with GP federations to provide out-of-hours services. Push Doctor and eConsult offer similar services.

In August 2019, the company announced a deal with the National Health Service in Birmingham, Shropshire and Northamptonshire. Patients will be able to sign up to the app through their practice, so they can access video GP consultations, referrals and prescriptions. In September 2019, it announced plans to offer GP video consultations on the NHS at Boots high street shops in north-west Surrey and in Liverpool Street, London. Doctors will be able to access and update patients' NHS Electronic Health Records.

In June 2020, it announced plans to integrate the service into NHS 111 in three regions of the UK.

North Tyneside Clinical Commissioning Group set up a 12-month pilot using Livi in August 2020 to offer online video appointments for all of its patients. This would deliver an extra 21,000 GP appointments a year. Livi GPs will have full access to patient records.

The services were rated as outstanding by the Care Quality Commission in 2021. It was commended for setting up the Covid Home Monitoring Service, which supported patients to access care without exposing other people to the virus. Livi Connect was also praised. It enabled 26,473 patients in the UK to have video consultations with healthcare professionals.

In September 2021 the company acquired an agency, VIX Digital, which specialises in designing software for the NHS.

In September 2026, Livi, which was being rebranded as Kry in France and the United Kingdom, was cited in media coverage of a controversy concerning so-called "queue-jumping" fees in teleconsultation services. Several platforms, including Livi, were reported as offering optional paid services linked to faster appointments or access to extended consultation hours.

Livi/Kry offered optional services carrying additional fees of up to €20, including same-day appointments and access to certain extended hours. These optional fees were not reimbursed by the French national health insurance system.

The practice was criticised in the French press over concerns about equality of access to healthcare.

== See also ==
- Ada Health
- Babylon Health
- WebMD
- Your.MD
