= ICLUB =

Ukrainian investment club

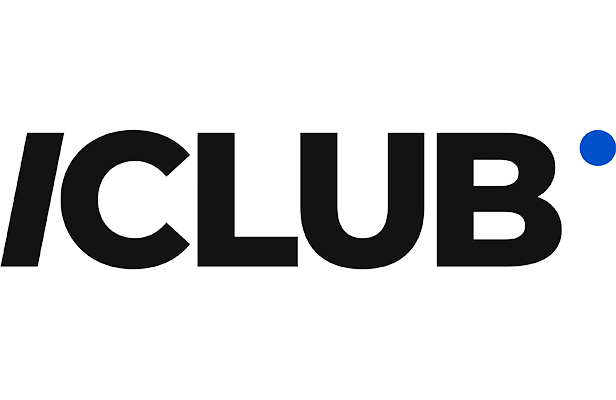
- Type: Private
- Industry: Venture capital
- Founded: 2018; 8 years ago in Kyiv, Ukraine
- Founder: Viktoriya Tihipko
- Key people: Viktoriya Tihipko
- Products: Investments, venture capital
- Parent: TA Ventures
- Website: iclub.vc

ICLUB is a global community of angel investment clubs founded by Viktoriya Tihipko's TA Ventures in 2018. ICLUB's clubs invest in startups sourced, approved and invested by the European venture fund TA Ventures. ICLUB acts as an intermediary between startups and private investors.

As of May 2025, ICLUB has made investments of over $65 million in 94 companies, all with funds from its platform's users.

== History ==
The first investment club was founded in 2018 by Viktoriya Tihipko's TA Ventures in Kyiv, Ukraine. During its first year of operation, it made its initial investments in startups, including Impress, a developer of orthodontic technology, and Bipi, a car subscription service.

By 2020, the club had reached 50 active members, reflecting growing interest in the retail investment syndicate model.

The year 2021 marked a significant milestone for ICLUB, as it completed its first four successful exits. Among them was Impress, which provides teeth alignment solutions using clear plastic aligners manufactured based on precise 3D scans. During its first year of operation, Impress increased its turnover thirteenfold and expanded from Spain into Italy, the United Kingdom, France, and Portugal. In 2021, the company raised a $50 million funding round, during which ICLUB members exited their investment.

Another exit involved Bipi, a long-term car subscription service founded in Spain in 2017. Within three years, the company grew to approximately 120 employees and served around 10,000 customers, becoming one of the leading players in its segment. In 2021, Bipi was acquired by the Renault Group.

ICLUB also exited its investment in Finimize, a financial media platform offering newsletters, a mobile application, and events aimed at making financial information more accessible. In 2021, Finimize was acquired by the asset management company abrdn.

The fourth exit in 2021 was related to Xometry, an online marketplace for custom industrial manufacturing. ICLUB became a shareholder in Xometry following its acquisition of portfolio company Shift. Later that year, Xometry completed an initial public offering, raising approximately $302 million. By the end of 2021, the number of active club members had increased to 150, and ICLUB expanded its operations to Kazakhstan.

In 2022, ICLUB lowered its minimum investment cheque to $10,000 and transitioned to an online investment format. The same year, the club completed a successful exit from Qentnis, a provider of financial indicators used by investors to analyse market and company performance. ICLUB sold its stake in Qentnis to Consumer Edge, completing the exit approximately eight months after the initial investment.

By 2023, the number of online syndicate members had reached 500.

In 2024, ICLUB reported several notable developments. Syndicate membership exceeded 2,000 participants, and the organisation launched its own mobile application to facilitate deal discovery and investment monitoring. The minimum investment cheque was further reduced to $5,000. During the same year, ICLUB completed a successful exit from Coterie, a company producing smart consumer products, including high-performance nappies and wipes. This year, ICLUB launched its own iOS and Android mobile application to facilitate investments and portfolio management.

Today, ICLUB provides access to investment opportunities in technological and high-growth companies of Europe, North America, LATAM, and APAC.

== Key people ==
- Viktoriya Tihipko, ICLUB Founder, TA Ventures Founding Partner;
- Yuriy Romanyukha, ICLUB Global, CEO;
- Anna Magiera, ICLUB Executive partner in Europe;
- Borys Budonyi, CFO;
- Niko Kharchilava, Head of Product;
- Inna Volyk, Head of Operations.

== Operations ==
From 2018 to 2022, the minimum cheque for one startup was $25,000; from June 2022, $10,000. In 2024, the minimum investment was reduced to $5,000. The largest individual cheque to a single startup was $250,000.

In 2022, the club invested $10 million in 27 companies. As of 2023, the club's members have invested in 80 companies and participated in 109 rounds. The club closes 2–4 deals per month, attracting approximately $1 million in investment. The total amount invested is more than $70 million.

In 2025, ICLUB invested $20 million in 18 deals (16 foreign and 2 Ukrainian). The total valuation of the ICLUB portfolio reached $90 million.

The fastest exit was in 8 months. It was a startup called Qentnis.

The average allocation was between $150 and $350 thousand. The largest allocation was $4 million (successfully closed).

== Investments ==
The main areas of investment are fintech, digital health, biotech, software, logistics, cybersecurity, and e-commerce.

In July 2021, ICLUB, together with TA Ventures, made an exit from the Spanish mobility startup Bipi. The exit was the result of Bipi's acquisition by Renault Group unit called RCI Bank and Services.

Additional notable exits include Coterie (U.S. innovative baby diapers manufacturer) in 2024 (one of the top-five deals by multiplier for TA Ventures) and Fintech Farm (U.K. fintech creating neobanks in emerging markets) in 2025.

The club's investments include such companies as: Gemini, Coterie, Liki24, Walnut, etc.

ICLUB's notable exists include:

Title	Headquarters	Description	Funding round	Acquirer	Holding period	Exit	In the media
Impress	Spain	Chain of orthodontic clinics	Pre-Seed	n/a	1.3 years	Partial	
Bipi	Spain	Car subscription startup	Series A	RCI Bank and Services	2.3 years	Yes	
Finimize	United Kingdom	Media product about finance with a focus on a closed platform community. A newsletter, app and events that talk about finance in simple terms	Series A	abrdn	11 months	Yes	
Shift	Germany	European on-demand manufacturing marketplace Shift	Seed	Share swap /IPO [Xometry] Online marketplace that allows customers to access a network of machine shops and custom manufacturers	3 months / 1.5 years	Yes	
Vochi	Belarus	Video and photo editing application that enables addition of effects to individual objects in real-time	Seed	Pinterest	10 months	Yes	
Qentnis	Germany	Provider of financial metrics that help hedge funds and other institutional investors analyze the development of both the market and specific companies to improve their investment strategies	Seed	Consumer Edge	8 months	Yes	
Coterie	United States	Manufacturer of innovative baby diapers and wipes	Series A	Financial investor	4 years	Yes	
Fintech Farm	United Kingdom	Fintech company creating neobanks in emerging markets	Series B	n/a	>2 years	Yes	
Gemini	United States	Cryptocurrency exchange and vault that allows customers to buy, sell and store digital assets.	Series A	NASDAQ IPO	Active since October 2021	IPO	

== Members ==
As of end of 2025 the syndicate reached 6000 members, supported by platform enhancements and a reduced minimum investment requirement. Distribution of members by location: Ukraine, EU countries, Central Asia and the Middle East.

Among the members: Biosphere Corporation founder Andriy Zdesenko, former Kyivstar CEO Petro Chernyshov, SCM Holdings top manager Andriy Gorokhov, Ajax Systems founder Oleksandr Konotopskyi, investment manager Maksym Koretskyi, professional boxer Oleksandr Usyk, and others.
