= The Darlins =

American country music duo

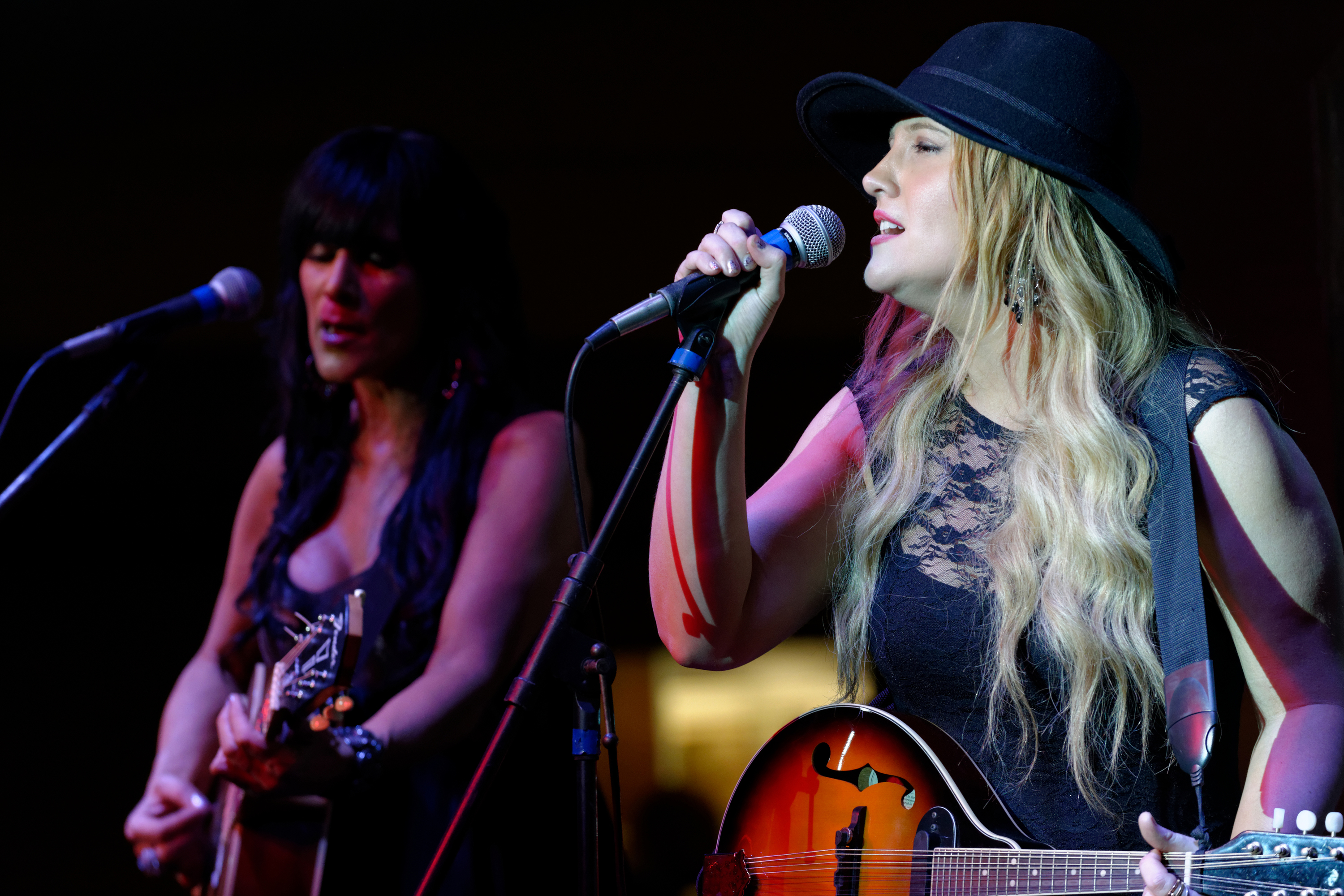

Background information
- Origin: Nashville, Tennessee, United States
- Genre: Country
- Years active: 2011-2017
- Label: VMG
- Members: Erinn Bates; Jude Toy
- Website: http://www.thedarlins.com

The Darlins is an American country music duo composed of Erinn Bates from Nashville, Tennessee (lead vocals/mandolin) and Jude Toy from Portland, Oregon (guitar/vocals).

The Darlins met at a Sephora in Nashville.

"All My Friends" was written by Erinn Bates, Jude Toy, and Max T. Barnes. The song got viral exposure via Twitter, Facebook, and YouTube after the video won first place in the national battle of the bands contest "The 2nd Hourly Gig" sponsored by Snagajob. Their prize was opening for Montgomery Gentry.

The Darlins' debut EP, Crush, was released in 2015. "Crush" features six songs written and co-written by Jude and Erinn and was produced by Buddy Hyatt from the Grammy Award Winning pop/rock band Toto.

The Darlins were named one of the 8 Best Artists of 2015 by the magazine, Nashville Music Guide. In 2016 the duo was nominated for Best Country Duo or Group at the Nashville Industry Music Awards.

The Darlins' official music video for "Crush" was released in October 2016; it was directed by Jonathan Barbee. In August 2017, The Darlins signed with VMG Records, founded by Grand Ole Opry star and Nashville Cat, Jim Vest. Their single "Blackberry Whiskey" was released on September 8, 2017.

The Darlins won Duo of the Year at the 2017 Josie Music Awards.

In November 2017, the duo parted ways.

Erinn Bates and her husband Glenn Ziser became country duo Hymn and Heart in 2019.

== Discography ==
=== Extended plays ===
Title	Album details
Crush	Release date: September 22, 2015; Label: Independent; Format: Music download

=== Singles ===
Year	Single	Album
2015	"Crush"	The Darlins

Year	Single	
2017	"Blackberry Whiskey"	The Darlins

=== Music videos ===
Year	Title	Director
2016	"Crush"	Jonathan Barbee
