= Coterie =

Coterie may refer to:

- A clique
- The Coterie, a British society
- Coterie (band), an Australian-New Zealand band
- Coterie (company), an American baby care brand based in New York City
- a family group of black-tailed and Mexican prairie dogs
- in computer science, an antichain of sets which are pairwise intersecting
- A literary coterie or circle
- A luxury assisted living facility that Wendy Williams lives in
