= KRY =

KRY may refer to:

- IATA code for Karamay Airport, China
- ISO 639-3 code for the Kryts language
- Yamaguchi Broadcasting, also known as KRY
- Bour Kry (born 1945), Supreme Patriarch of the Thammayut order of Cambodia
- The Kry, a band from Canada
- LIVI, a Swedish medical app called KRY in Sweden and Norway
