= Doctor in Distress =

Doctor in Distress may refer to:

- Doctor in Distress (film), 1963, starring Dirk Bogarde
- Doctor in Distress (song), a 1985 ensemble charity single related to Doctor Who

== See also ==
- Doctors in Distress, a British charity
