= Business-to-business =

Commercial transaction between businesses

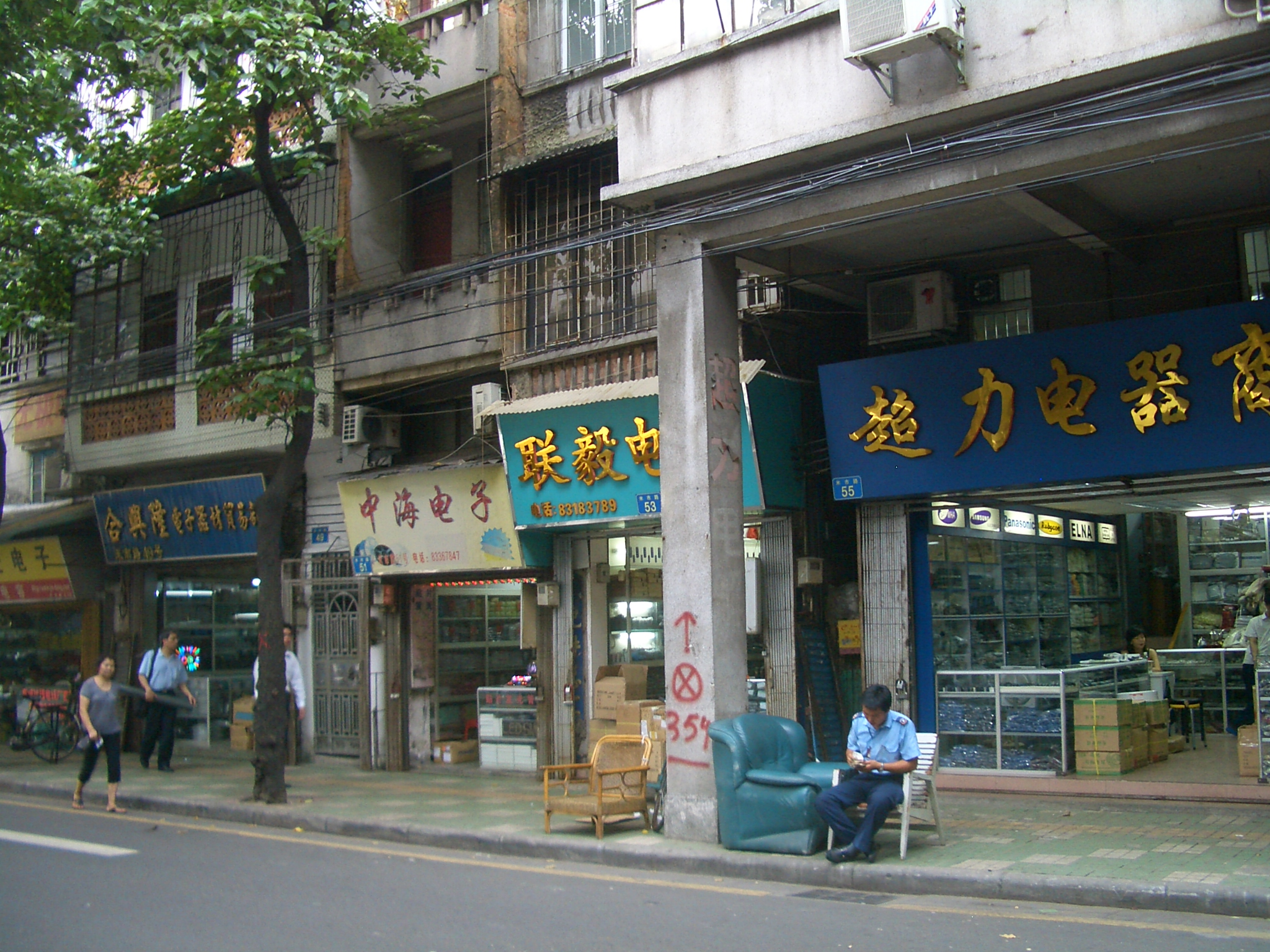
The "electronic components district" of Guangzhou, where numerous shops sell electronic components to other companies that would use them to manufacture consumer goods

Business-to-business (B2B, BtoB or B4B) refers to a form of commercial activity in which one business engages in trade with other business enterprises as its customers. This typically occurs when:

- A business sources materials for its production process for output (e.g., a food manufacturer purchasing salt), i.e. providing raw material to the other company that will produce output.
- A business needs the services of another for operational reasons (e.g., a food manufacturer employing an accountancy firm to audit their finances).
- A business re-sells goods and services produced by others (e.g., a retailer buying the end product from the food manufacturer).

Business-to-business activity is thought to allow business segmentation.

B2B is often contrasted with business-to-consumer (B2C) trade, the latter of which typically sells directly to the general public and consumers, rather than other businesses and organisations.

== Organization ==
Successful B2B operations depend upon sales personnel understanding the purchasing behaviour and outlook of the types of business they wish to work with.

B2B involves specific challenges at different stages. At their formation, organizations should be careful to rely on an appropriate combination of contractual and relational mechanisms. Specific combinations of contracts and relational norms may influence the nature and dynamics of the negotiations between firms. Business-to-business companies represent a significant part of the United States economy. This is especially true in firms with 500 employees and above, of which there were 19,464 in 2015, where it is estimated that as many as 72% are businesses that primarily serve other businesses.

== Business to business models ==
=== Vertical B2B model ===
Vertical B2B is generally oriented to manufacturing or business. It can be divided into two directions: upstream and downstream. Producers or commercial retailers can have a supply relationship with upstream suppliers, including manufacturers, and form a sales relationship. As an example, Dell works with upstream suppliers of integrated circuit microchips and computer printed circuit boards (PCBs).

A vertical B2B website can be similar to the enterprise's online store. Through the website, the company can promote its products vigorously, more efficiently, and more comprehensively, enriching transactions by helping customers better understand their products. Alternatively, the website can be created for business purposes, where the seller advertises their products to promote and expand transactions.

=== Horizontal B2B model ===
Horizontal B2B is a type of transaction pattern where a platform connects buyers and sellers from various different industries for similar, general-purpose transactions. It consolidates similar transactions from various industries into one platform, offering trading opportunities for both buyers and suppliers. Typically, it involves companies that do not own or sell the products but serve as a platform to connect sellers and buyers online. The better platforms help buyers easily find information about the sellers and the relevant information about the products via the website.

A good example of a horizontal B2B model is bankers vs corporate lawyers.

=== Growth of e-procurement ===
E-procurement has become a key driver of efficiency and competitiveness. These digital approaches streamline procurement, enhance transparency, and reduce transaction costs globally (Ju & Tang, 2017). E-procurement systems also automate processes of bidding, vendor management, and contract execution, accelerating procurement cycles and supporting more accurate decision-making. The adoption of such systems has proven beneficial for both large corporations and small and medium-sized enterprises that face mounting challenges due to globalization and intensified market competition. A 2022 Amazon report highlighted a "rapid transformation of B2B e-procurement in recent years", with 91% of the B2B buyers surveyed in their study stating that they preferred online purchasing.

In addition to online purchasing, the introduction of advanced AI tools has changed the way strategic decisions are taken by procurement executives. 94% of procurement executives are using AI in sourcing activities.

=== B2B2C ===
B2B2C means "business-to-business-to-consumer". According to the TechTarget website, the purpose of the terminology is to "extend the business-to-business model to include e-commerce for consumers". An aim of B2B2C is to "create a mutually beneficial relationship between suppliers of goods and services and online retailers". According to Lomate and Ramachandran, it enables manufacturers (the first "B" in B2B2C) to connect with, understand and serve their end customers ("C") without undermining their sales and distribution networks, including online sellers (the second "B") or excluding them from continuing customer engagement.

== Comparison with selling to consumers ==
The defining difference between B2B and business-to-consumer trade (B2C) is that the first one refers to commerce transactions between manufacturer and retailer, and the second one it is the retailer supplying goods to the consumer. These transactions are typically smaller in scale but higher in frequency and products on B2C platforms range from consumer electronics to fashion, entertainment, and groceries. Examples include Amazon, eBay, Alibaba (also involved in B2C), Flipkart, and Etsy. In B2B commerce, it is often the case that the parties to the relationship have comparable negotiating power, and even when they do not, each party typically involves professional staff and legal counsel in the negotiation of terms, whereas within a B2C context, relationships are shaped to a far greater degree by the economic implications of information asymmetry. However, in B2B, large companies may have many commercial, resource and information advantages over smaller businesses. The United Kingdom government, for example, created the post of Small Business Commissioner under the Enterprise Act 2016 to "enable small businesses to resolve disputes" and "consider complaints by small business suppliers about payment issues with larger businesses that they supply."

In many cases, the overall volume of B2B (business-to-business) transactions is much higher than the volume of B2C transactions. The primary reason for this is that in a typical supply chain there will be many B2B transactions involving subcomponents or raw materials, and only one B2C transaction, specifically the sale of the finished product to the end customer. For example, an automobile manufacturer makes several B2B transactions such as buying tires, glass for windows, and rubber hoses for its vehicles. The final transaction, a finished vehicle sold to the consumer, is a single (B2C) transaction.

== National characteristics of B2B trade ==
Business-to-business (B2B) markets differ from business-to-consumer (B2C) markets in many ways. For one, the number of products sold in B2B markets dwarfs the number sold in consumer markets. Two, products sold in business to business markets often tend to be more technical in nature because they are often large complex system for things like machinery and equipment. For example, many businesses purchase manufacturing equipment or machines to produce their finish goods. The purchase of these types of equipment tends to be more technical because of the complexity of this type of equipment.

B2B Corporations, Wholesalers, Manufacturers Business-to-business (B2B) platforms also primarily target organisations such as corporations, wholesalers, manufacturers, and other business entities that engage in large-scale, often long-term commercial transactions. These platforms cater to businesses that require bulk orders, custom solutions, and specific operational requirements. The decision-making process in B2B transactions typically involves multiple stakeholders, such as procurement managers, financial officers, and technical experts, who assess the value proposition over time. Example: Alibaba, ThomasNet, and Amazon Business are all examples of B2B platforms that allow companies to source materials, products, or services in large quantities from other businesses. These platforms focus on building long-term relationships and providing solutions tailored to each business's needs.

== See also ==
- Account manager
- B2B e-commerce
- Business-to-consumer (B2C)
- Business-to-government (B2G)
- Customer to customer (C2C)
