= E-consult =

e-consult is a mechanism developed by the Department of Veterans Affairs that enables primary care providers to obtain specialists' inputs into a patient's care treatment without requiring the patient to go to a face-to-face visit.

== Overview ==
E-consult is a web-enabled system and process, where primary care clinicians and specialists are able to communicate, share clinical information and consult electronically to manage patient care. It reduces the specialty referral and appointment process to just a few days, which increases the speed delivery for patient care services.

=== Process ===
- Step 1 – PCP asks patient to agree to an e-consult
- Step 2 – PCP enters an e-consult request with a defined clinical question
- Step 3 – Specialist reviews chart and answers the clinical question
- Step 4 – The PCP communicates the specialist's recommendations to the patient and formulates a care plan with the patient

=== Implementation ===
Closed health systems with existing electronic health record (EHR) can incorporate e-consult services into the system, making start-up cost minimal. Open health systems must create a secured website portal to utilize e-consult service due to discrepancy in their respective EHR systems.

== Cost and benefit analysis ==
Mayo Clinic researchers estimated that their system could avoid 1,800 specialty consultations and subsequently reduce direct costs by $450,000 annually, if each provider orders e-consultations two to three times every month.

Patient benefits:

- Increased satisfaction
- Improved continuity of care
- Improved access to specialty care
- Improved patient care
- Timeliness of results

Additionally, Mayo Clinic's e-consult resulted in a shorter time frame of 1 day and 6 hours, compared to 7 days and 20 hours for traditional consultation. In a study at San Francisco General Hospital, 60% of PCPs reported better access for non-urgent issues, and 54% reported shorter wait times for arranging a new appointment with a specialist.

=== Provider benefits ===
- Exchange medical skills
- Less interrupted workflow
- Pre-screen potential in-person visit
- Improved track of referrals

Due to better transfer of skills from specialists to PCPs, general practitioners for chronic kidney disease in the UK reported more confidence in managing the condition. Also, clinicians reported less interrupted workflow due to asynchronous communication. A specialist survey at Mayo Clinic agreed that e-consult was less disruptive than consultations by telephone or pager by 67%. And at the San Francisco General Hospital there was a reduction of 2.1% in inappropriate specialty referrals by the surgical specialty clinicians compared to 9.8% of paper-based referrals. PCPs also saw improvements in their ability to track referrals by 89%.

=== Disadvantage ===
Disadvantage of e-consult is workload shift from specialist or administrative staff to PCPs. Tasks, usually performed by administrative staff such as tracking referral process and correcting errors, are PCP's responsibility in the e-consultation system. Moreover, PCPs are responsible for completing the prior work-up that the specialist requests, whereas such work was done by specialist as necessary in the paper referral system.

== Policy implications ==
Under the Balanced Budget Act of 1997 (BBA), only services provided to rural Health Professional Shortage Areas were eligible for reimbursement. With the changing Medicare requirements, hospitals are beginning to utilize technology to meet Accountable Care Organization (ACO) requirements. The American Recovery and Reinvestment Act of 2009 (ARRA) allocated $417 billion to the Federal Communications Commission (FCC) to implement national broadband networks. Additional grants are available and can be found at the Health Resources and Services Administration (HRSA).

The Affordable Care Act (ACA) emphasizes integrated care that provides a value-driven and patient-centered health care. According to Section 3022, an ACO is required to define a process that promotes evidence-based medicine and coordinated care through the use of telehealth and other enabling technologies. Telehealth, such as e-consultation, can facilitate communications between providers and patients, while making ACOs viable.

=== Department of Veterans Affairs ===
E-consult was developed by the Office of Specialty Care Transformation, under the Department of Veterans Affairs to improve access to specialty care. In the Department of Veterans Affairs system, e-consult requires a multi-departmental collaboration. There is an e-consult lead who coordinates between departments to ensure that e-consult service is implemented correctly and adheres to both facility and national policies.

In order for an e-consult program to be active in a specialty clinic, a location name and note title must be created in the VA's EHR system called Computerized Patient Record System (CPRS). The Clinic Maintenance Department creates a location name to ensure that non-billing and workload codes are attached to the location name. Once created, the Clinical Informatics Department takes the newly created clinic name and links it to a newly created Note Title in CPRS. This allows for PCPs to go into the CPRS system and have the ability to select the desired specialty e-consult (location clinic) to send an e-consult request. When a specialist answers the PCPs e-consult request, he or she responds using the Note Title specifically for that specialty clinic. E-consult must be completed or forwarded to an in-person visit within three business days of it being requested.

=== L.A. Care ===
L.A. Care, a publicly operated health plan, has increased efforts for the adoption of virtual care to improve patient access to specialty care. Beginning in 2009, L.A. Care engaged SynerMed and Partners in Care Foundation to launch an 18-month e-consult pilot program. It included 1,300 PCPs in 108 community clinics and health centers across Los Angeles County, California. L.A. Care plans to expand the program to an additional 76 sites throughout 2013 to serve close to one million low-income individuals and families. Preliminary results indicated that about half of the e-consults generated a reduction of 24% to 48% of face-to-face visits based on specialty.

=== Los Angeles Department of Health Services (DHS) ===
The Los Angeles County Department of Health Services is the second largest public health system in the nation and the largest provider of uncompensated care in the county. With the goal of improving the health of county residents through innovation and research, it implemented e-consult across more than 40 ambulatory and primary care clinic sites in June 2012. Currently, e-consult serves safety net patients with the goal of increasing the access to specialty care for Medi-Cal recipients.

Outcomes to date

- On average, specialists responded to e-consults within 2.6 days (includes non-business days).
- 35% of patients on e-consult were managed without face-to-face specialist visits.
- In some specialties, there was more than a 50% reduction in wait time for face-to-face visits.
- 1,500 + PCPs using the system at 162 sites (43 DHS, 119 community partners).

== See also ==
- Telehealth
- Electronic referrals
- American Telemedicine Association
- Remote therapy
- Telemedicine
- Electronic health record
