= General practice =

Patient-based medical care provided across age, gender and specialty boundaries

General practice is personal, family, and community-oriented comprehensive primary care that includes diagnosis, continues over time and is anticipatory as well as responsive.

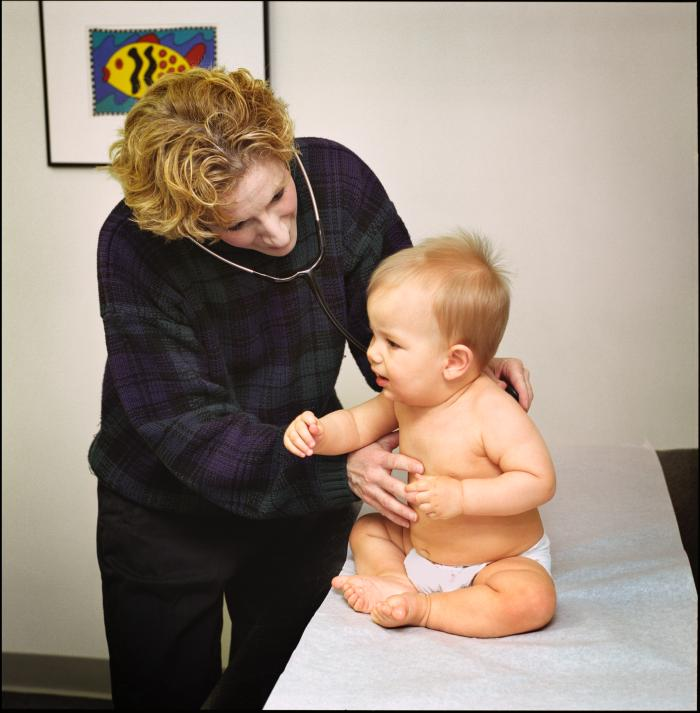
General practice is personal, family, and community-oriented comprehensive primary care

== Definitions ==
A general practitioner (GP) is a doctor who is a consultant in the discipline of general practice. GPs have distinct expertise and experience in providing whole person medical care whilst managing the complexity, uncertainty and risk associated with the continuous care they provide. GPs work at the heart of their communities, striving to provide comprehensive and equitable care for everyone, taking into account their health care needs, stage of life and background. GPs work in, connect with and lead multidisciplinary teams that care for people and their families, respecting the context in which they live, aiming to ensure all of their physical health and mental health needs are met.

General practice is an academic and scientific discipline with its own educational content, research, evidence base and clinical activity. Characteristics that define the discipline of general practice are:

- person centredness
- continuity of care
- comprehensiveness
- whole person care
- diagnostic and therapeutic skill
- coordination and clinical teamwork
- continuous quality improvement
- professional, clinical and ethical standards
- leadership, advocacy and equity
- continuing evolution of the speciality.

The general practice model is used in countries such as the United Kingdom, Australia, New Zealand, the Netherlands, India and South Africa. In some countries, such as the United States, similar services may be described as family medicine or primary care. The term primary care may include services provided by GPs, community nursing, allied health, pharmacy, optometrist, dentistry, and community hearing care providers. The balance of care between primary care and secondary care - which usually refers to hospital based services - varies from place to place. In many countries there are initiatives to move services out of hospitals into the community, in the expectation that this will be cost-effective and be more convenient.

== Ireland ==
In Ireland there are about 2,500 General Practitioners working in group practices, primary care centres, single practices and health centres.

== Australia ==
General Practice services in Australia are funded under the Medicare Benefits Scheme (MBS) which is a public health insurance scheme. Australians need a referral from the GP to be able to access specialist care. Most general practitioners work in a general practitioner practice, supported by practice nurses and administrative staff. Often other health professionals such as allied health practitioners and pharmacists are part of general practice teams to provide an integrated multidisciplinary healthcare team to deliver primary care.

== United Kingdom ==
The pattern of services in the UK was largely established by the National Insurance Act 1911 which established the list system which came from the friendly societies across the country. Every patient was entitled to be on the list, or panel of a general practitioner. In 1911 that only applied to those who paid National insurance contributions. In 1938 43% of the adult population was covered by a panel doctor. When the National Health Service was established in 1948 this extended to the whole population. The practice would be responsible for the patient record and would be transferred if necessary to another practice if the patient changed practice. In the UK, unlike many other countries, patients do not normally have direct access to hospital consultants and the GP controls access to secondary care.

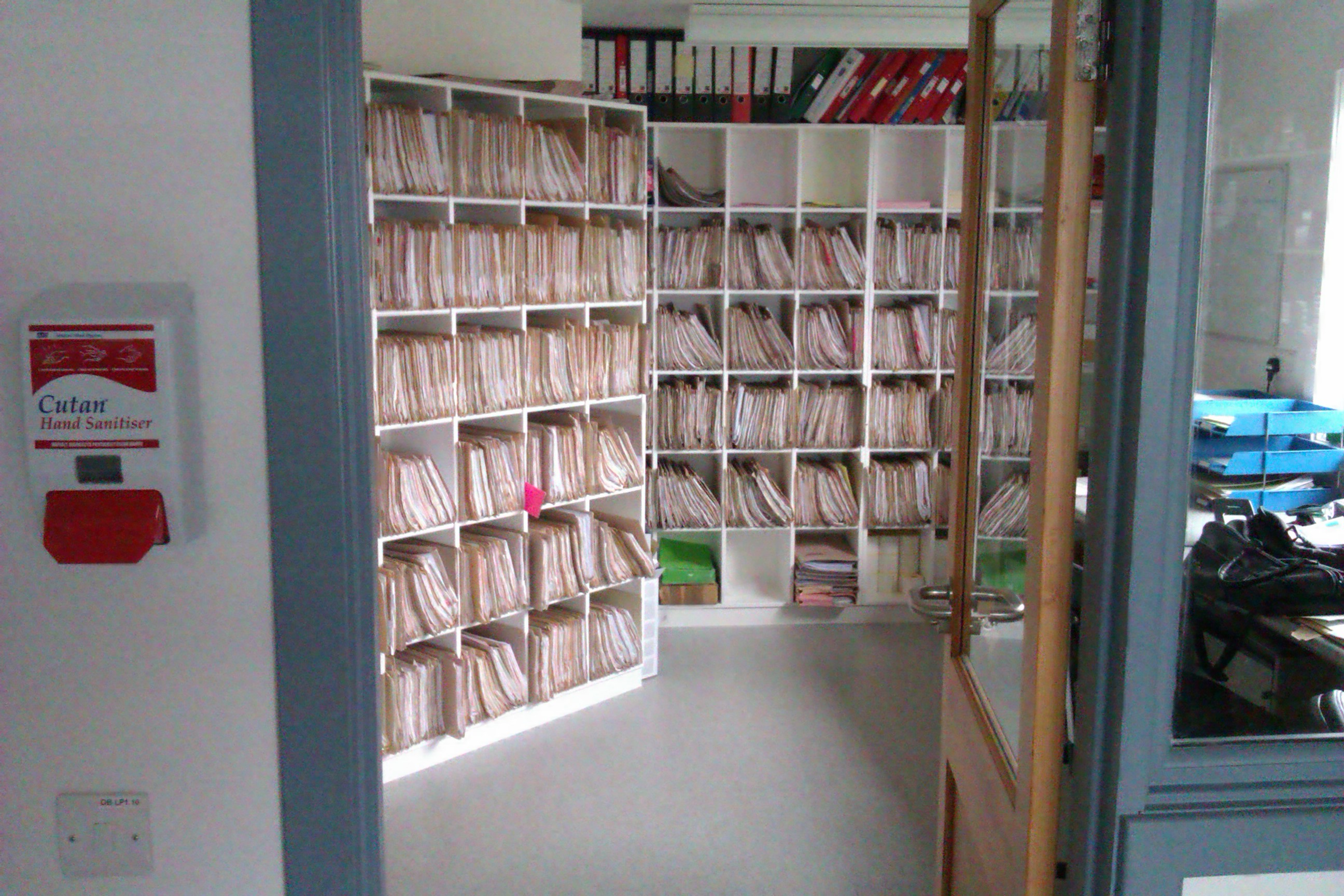
Lloyd George envelopes at Whalsay Health Centre 2012

Most services are provided under the General Medical Services Contract, which is regularly revised. GPs could always see patients privately - for payment - but until recently that was rare. They have to be registered as independent consulting doctors. In the 2020s the number doing so increased considerably. Most also work for the NHS, but they report that private work is less stressful.

In 1953, general practitioners were estimated to be making between 12 and 30 home visits each day and seeing between 15 and 50 patients in their surgeries. In 2019 according to NHS England, almost 90% of salaried GPs were working part-time.

Under the pressure of the Coronavirus epidemic in 2020 general practice shifted very quickly to remote working, something which had been progressing very slowly up to that point. In the Hurley Group Clare Gerada reported that "99% of all our work is now online" using a digital triage system linked to the patient's electronic patient record which processes up to 3000 consultations per hour. Video calling is used to "see" patients if that is needed.

Overloading of GP services led to effective healthcare rationing through what was known as the "8am scramble", causing patient dissatisfaction.

More than 80% of GPs feared patients may be at risk from bad decisions because GPs are overworked and understaffed in March 2022. In September 2022 1.45 million patients waited at least 28 days before seeing a GP. In November 2022 GPs told The Observer most days they breach the British Medical Association (BMA) guideline of "not more than 25 contacts per day" to provide safe care. In March 2021 Pulse did a survey which revealed GPs were dealing with 37 patients per day on average.

=== Premises ===
Practices were generally small, often single handed, operating from the doctor's home and often with the doctor's wife acting as a receptionist. When the NHS was established in 1948 there were plans for the building of health centres, but few were built. The British Medical Association in 2019 conducted a survey for GP premises. About half of the 1,011 respondents thought their surgeries were not suitable for present needs, and 78% said they would not be able to handle expected future demands.

==== Number and size of practices ====
599 GP practices closed between 2010–11 and 2014–15, while 91 opened and average practice list size increased from 6,610 to 7,171. In 2016 there were 7,613 practices in England, 958 in Scotland, 454 in Wales and 349 in Northern Ireland. There were 7435 practices in England and the average practice list size in June 2017 was 7,860. There were 1.35 million patients over 85. There has been a great deal of consolidation into larger practices, especially in England. Lakeside Healthcare was the largest practice in England in 2014, with 62 partners and more than 100,000 patients. Maintaining general practices in isolated communities has become very challenging, and calls on very different skills and behaviour from that required in large practices where there is increasing specialisation. By 1 October 2018, 47 GP practices in England had a list size of 30,000 or more and the average list size had reached 8,420. In 2019 the average number of registered patients per GP in England has risen since 2018 by 56 to 2,087.

=== England ===
In 2004, regulations were changed in Labour government reforms to allow new entrants, including commercial companies, to operate one or more general practices, named Alternative Provider Medical Services. Research in 2015 found that 4% of general practices were being run under these new arrangements, but they had not made improvements in the quality of service though they often operated in more deprived populations.

The GP Forward View, published by NHS England in 2016 promised £2.4 billion (14%) real-terms increase in the budget for general practice. Jeremy Hunt pledged to increase the number of doctors working in general practice by 5,000. There are 3,250 trainee places available in 2017. The GP Career Plus scheme is intended to retain GPs aged over 55 in the profession by providing flexible roles such as providing cover, carrying out specific work such as managing long-term conditions, or doing home visits. In July Simon Stevens announced a programme designed to recruit around 2,000 GPs from the EU and possibly New Zealand and Australia. According to NHS Improvement a 1% deterioration in access to general practice can produce a 10% deterioration in emergency department figures.

GPs are increasingly employing pharmacists to manage the increasingly complex medication regimes of an aging population. In 2017 more than 1,061 practices were employing pharmacists, following the rollout of NHS England's Clinical Pharmacists in General Practice programme. There are also moves to employ care navigators, sometimes an enhanced role for a receptionist, to direct patients to different services such as pharmacy and physiotherapy if a doctor is not needed. In September 2017 270 trained care navigators covering 64,000 patients had been employed across Wakefield. It was estimated that they had saved 930 GP hours over a 10-month trial.

Four NHS trusts: Northumbria Healthcare NHS Foundation Trust; Yeovil District Hospital NHS Foundation Trust; Royal Wolverhampton NHS Trust; and Southern Health NHS Foundation Trust have taken over multiple GP practices in the interests of integration. In March 2022 Sajid Javid supported a report by Policy Exchange which described the existing general practice model as "outdated". He is said to be "considering radical changes to the 70-year-old structure of the NHS that could see many family doctors directly employed by hospitals instead of running their own surgeries."

GP Federations have become popular among English General practitioners.

==== Registration ====
Patients can register with a local GP or with a GP based in another area. Since May 2025, newly registering patients who are old enough are being asked whether they received a blood transfusion before 1996: this action has been introduced in conjunction with an attempt to find undiagnosed patients affected by the contaminated blood scandal of the 1970s and 1980s.

In 2026 practices are paid about £130 per year for every patient registered, on top of any payment for seeing or treating them. 63.4 million patients were registered with practices in England. That is 4.8 million more than the population.

GP at Hand, an online service using Babylon Health's app, was launched in November 2017 by the Lillie Road Health Centre, a conventional GP practice in west London. It recruited 7000 new patients in its first month, of whom 89.6% were between 20 and 45 years old. The service was widely criticised by GPs for cherry picking. Patients with long term medical conditions or who might need home visits were actively discouraged from joining the service. Richard Vautrey warned that it risked "undermining the quality and continuity of care and further fragmenting the service provided to the public".

==== Funding Streams ====
The funding of primary care is from central government via Integrated Care Boards and is complex. Some of it is based on capitation which is age weighted and is enhanced by the degree of deprivation. So although a practice may have 10000 patients they may be paid for more or less depending on the problematic Carr Hill formula.

There are also incentive schemes, quality payments, and targets which if reached will also attract payments.

==== Consultations ====
According to the Local Government Association 57 million GP consultations in England in 2015 were for minor conditions and illnesses, 5.2 million of them for blocked noses. According to the King's Fund between 2014 and 2017 the number of telephone and face-to-face contacts between patients and GPs rose by 7.5% although GP numbers have stagnated. The mean consultation length in the UK has increased steadily over time from around 5 minutes in the 1950s to around 9·22 minutes in 2013–2014. This is shorter than the mean consultation length in a number of other developed countries around the world.

The proportion of patients in England waiting longer than seven days to see a GP rose from 12.8% in 2012 to 20% in 2017. There were 307 million GP appointments, about a million each working day, with more on Mondays, in the year from November 2017. 40% got a same-day appointment. 2.8 million patients, 10.3%, in October 2018, compared to 9.4% in November 2017, did not see the doctor until at least 21 days after they had booked their appointment, and 1.4 million waited for more than 28 days. More than a million people each month failed to turn up for their appointment.

Commercial providers are rare in the UK but a private GP service was established at Poole Road Medical Centre in Bournemouth in 2017 where patients can pay to skip waiting lists to see a doctor.

The COVID-19 pandemic in the United Kingdom led to a sudden move to remote working. In March 2020 the proportion of telephone appointments increased by over 600%.

=== Patient satisfaction ===
85% of patients rate their overall experience of primary care as good in 2016, but practices run by limited companies operating on APMS contracts (a small minority) performed worse on four out of five key indicators - frequency of consulting a preferred doctor, ability to get a convenient appointment, rating of doctor communication skills, ease of contacting the practice by telephone and overall experience.

=== Northern Ireland ===
There have been particularly acute problems in general practice in Northern Ireland as it has proved very difficult to recruit doctors in rural practices. The British Medical Association collected undated resignation letters in 2017 from GPs who threatened to leave the NHS and charge consultation fees. They demanded increased funding, more recruitment and improved computer systems.

A new GP contract was announced in June 2018 by the Northern Ireland Department of Health. It included funding for practice-based pharmacists, an extra £1 million for increased indemnity costs, £1.8 million because of population growth, and £1.5 million for premises upgrades.
