= Xometry =

American manufacturing company

Xometry, Inc.
- Formerly: NextLine Manufacturing Corp.
- Type: Public
- Traded as: Nasdaq: XMTR (Class A); Russell 2000 component
- Industry: Marketplace
- Founded: 2013; 13 years ago
- Founders: Randy Altschuler; Laurence Zuriff
- Headquarters: North Bethesda, Maryland, U.S.
- Key people: Sanjeev Singh Sahni (CEO); Randy Altschuler (Executive Chairman)
- Revenue: ▲US$687 million (2025)
- Net income: ▼ −US$61.7 million (2025)
- Number of employees: 1,500 (2026)
- Website: xometry.com

Xometry (formerly, NextLine Manufacturing Corp.) is an online marketplace for sourcing on-demand manufactured parts for prototyping and large-scale production.

Based in the United States, its B2B platform matches buyers with parts suppliers. It serves a worldwide market, with localized platforms in the U.S., Europe, the UK, Australia and China.

== Overview ==
The company quotes costs from uploaded CAD files, rendered in 3D, directly within design environments. It employs Autodesk Inventor and the Autodesk Fusion platform with its own suite of AI-powered proprietary procurement and production tools.

Xometry’s marketplace has over 4,200 active B2B suppliers, and 78,000 buyers. Production methods include CNC-machining, additive manufacturing, injection molding, urethane casting, die casting, and pipe and sheet metal fabrication. It is available in 18 languages, processes transactions in six currencies, and is typically enlisted by engineers and designers in industries such as aerospace and defense, automotive, healthcare, consumer goods and industrial equipment.

== History ==
Xometry was founded as a procurement platform for on-demand unique parts manufacturing, in 2013, by founding CEO Randy Altschuler and managing director Laurence Zuriff, as NextLine Manufacturing Corp., changing its name to Xometry in 2015.

The company developed the patented processes of its instant quoting engine, which calculates factors such as volume, material, location and manufacturing type. Early investors include BMW, GE, and Highland Capital Partners.

Fabio Rosati joined the board of directors in 2017, then became its chair in 2023. Katharine Weymouth joined the board in 2020.

Between 2018 and 2020, the company experienced a compound annual growth rate of 92%, with revenues of $141.4 million, and a customer base that includes BMW, NASA, Bosch, Dell, and General Electric. Since 2020, it has been named annually among the Deloitte Technology Fast 500.

In March 2021, Xometry's Autodesk Fusion app was introduced. Prior to its June 29, 2021 IPO, Xometry had processed over six million component transactions since its founding, with over 43,000 buyers and 5,000 sellers on its platform, including about 30% of Fortune 500 companies. It raised over $150 million in venture capital funding, with investors including T. Rowe Price Funds and Dell Technologies Capital. The IPO raised about $300 million, closing with a market cap of $3.7 billion. On the following day, company shares had risen over 50% when it began trading on Nasdaq under the symbol XMTR.

In 2022, the company expanded its European services and launched Xometry Asia, later adding an English site for Asia, in 2024. The company relocated its headquarters to North Bethesda, Maryland, in December 2022.

In 2023, Xometry added a cloud-based collaborative dashboard, then integrated Teamspace, in 2024, which allows teams to collaborate on orders.

Cofounder Laurence Zuriff resigned from the board of directors in 2024. Sanjeev Singh Sahni was appointed the CEO of Xometry in July 2026. He succeeded Randy Altschuler, who in turn succeeded Fabio Rosati as Executive Chairman.

=== Acquisitions ===
In July 2018, Xometry acquired MakeTime, a manufacturing platform based in Lexington, Kentucky.

In January 2019, the company acquired Machine Tool & Supply of Jackson, Tennessee and began to offer cutting tools, metal, and other supplies for manufacturers via Xometry Supplies.

In December 2019, it acquired Shift, a Munich based on-demand manufacturing marketplace, renamed Xometry Europe. The acquisition added 12 countries to the company's roster.

In December 2021, Xometry acquired the Thomas B2B platform, with a network of over 500,000 commercial and industrial suppliers, and 1.3 million users.

== See also ==
- Protolabs Network
- Maker's Row
- MFG.com
