= Hurley Group =

British healthcare provider

- Industry: Healthcare services
- Founded: 1969 in London, England
- Headquarters: London, England
- Areas served: Central London; Harold Wood; Bexley; Erith
- Key people: Clare Gerada
- Number of employees: 250+
- Website: www.hurleygroup.co.uk

The Hurley Group registered with the CQC as the Hurley Clinic Partnership, is a large provider of primary care services in London, one of only three organisations in England which served more than 100,000 patients in 2014. As of 2025, it runs 2 Urgent Care Centres, 12 GP practices and has over 250 employees, providing a variety of NHS services across London.

Dr Clare Gerada is one of four GP partners in the firm. It was noted during her active campaign against the Health and Social Care Act 2012 that the group could face substantial competition from private providers if they were allowed to compete equally to provide NHS services. Other GPs were reported as complaining that the Hurley Group was "swooping in and taking over in areas where it normally has no business".

Expansion of larger organisations like the Hurley Group has been advocated as a means whereby the quality and capacity of primary care services in England could be enhanced, for example by the King's Fund report in 2011. Dr Arvind Madan, partner and chief executive, made a presentation to the Nuffield Trust event "Transforming general practice: unlocking the potential" in May 2013.

In June 2014, the group was awarded a five-year £17m contract to provide urgent care centres outside Queen Mary’s Hospital and Erith Hospital by Bexley Clinical Commissioning Group.

All Saints Practice, in Poplar, east London, one of the 18 practices in the group, was put in special measures by the Care Quality Commission in April 2017.

In June 2018, the practice announced that it planned to use its eConsult online system for most consultations. This enables patients to submit their symptoms to a GP electronically, and offers around-the-clock NHS self-help information, signposting to services and a symptom checker. 12 GPs are using eConsult and it is planned to recruit 12 more, so patients will only be seen in person where necessary. 340 other practices are also using eConsult and a majority of the 479 GP practices are expected to have implemented an online consultation system by April 2018.

During the COVID-19 pandemic in England, the practice reorganised itself into "hot" and "cold" sites, working 12-hour days and offering face-to-face appointments all the way through.

It was announced in October 2024 that the Hurley Group had sold eConsult to the digital solutions firm Huma for an undisclosed amount. The software was valued somewhere in the region of £41.5 million.
