= Viktoriya Tihipko =

Viktoriya Tigipko
- Вікторія Вікторівна Тігіпко
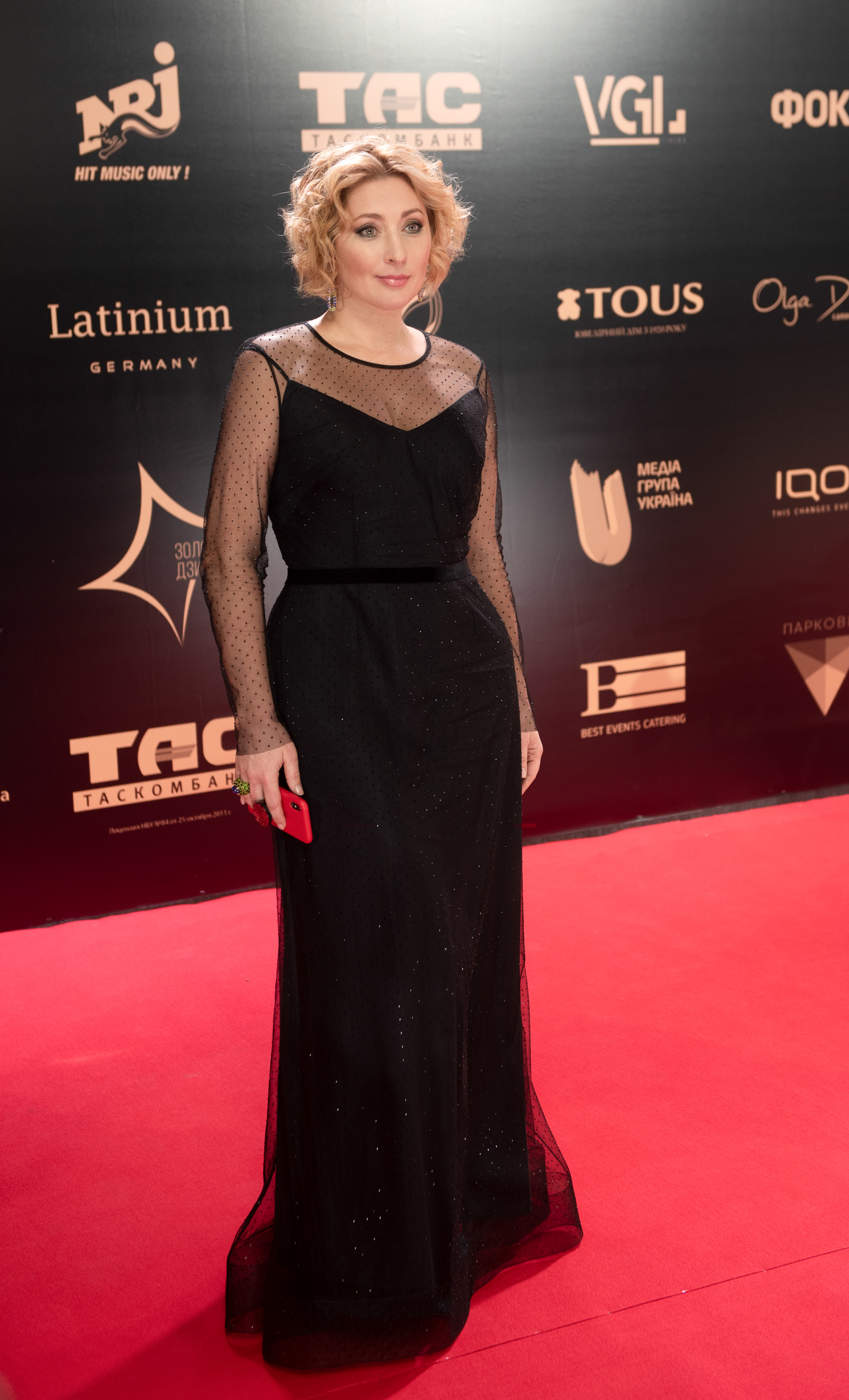
- Viktoriya Tigipko on Dzyga awards ceremony
- Born: Kyiv, Ukrainian Soviet Socialist Republic, USSR
- Education: Kyiv National Economic University named after Vadym Hetman
- Occupations: entrepreneur, venture capitalist and angel investor

Viktoriya Viktorivna Tigipko (Ukrainian: Вікторія Вікторівна Тігіпко; née Lopatetska) is a Ukrainian entrepreneur, venture capitalist and angel investor. She is the founder and managing partner of TA Ventures, the founder of the international angel investment syndicate ICLUB, co-founder of the women-in-tech community Wtech, founder of the startup conference IDCEE (Investor Day Central and Eastern Europe), founder of the Odesa International Film Festival, co-founder and Chair of the Supervisory Board of the Ukrainian Film Academy, and Chairwoman of the Advisory Board of the Ukrainian Startup Fund from its inception in 2019 until the end of 2025.

Tigipko is known for her early-stage investments in technology companies across Europe, the United States, the Middle East and Southeast Asia, as well as for her long-term role in building venture capital, angel investing, startup, and cultural ecosystems in Ukraine and internationally.

== Early life and education ==
Viktoriya Tigipko was born in Kyiv into a family of a military musician and a medical doctor.

In 1996, she graduated with honors from the Faculty of International Economic Relations and Law at the Kyiv Institute of National Economy (now Kyiv National Economic University named after Vadym Hetman). She later continued her education abroad, studying financial management at the Vienna University of Economics and Business, and completed executive education programs in venture capital and investment management.

In 1996, Viktoriya Tihipko graduated with honors from the faculty of International Economic Relations and Law from the Kyiv National Economic University named after Vadym Hetman. She later continued her education abroad, studying financial management at the Vienna University of Economics and Business, and completed executive education programs in venture capital and investment management.

== Career trajectory ==
=== Entrepreneurship and early career ===
Tigipko began her entrepreneurial career in the early 1990s as a solo founder, independently building and operating multiple offline businesses in industrial distribution, manufacturing, and services. She personally founded, managed, and scaled these companies without co-founders.

She represented and distributed international industrial brands in Ukraine, including KÄRCHER, Schlick, Primus, LAVAMAC working with professional equipment, industrial systems, and commercial solutions.

This stage of her career formed her operational expertise in business execution, cross-border partnerships, and long-term company building.

=== Venture investing and TA Ventures ===
In 2010, Tigipko founded TA Ventures as a venture-building platform. Over time, it evolved into a single family office focused on technology investments and later into a global early-stage venture capital fund.

As of 2026, TA Ventures Fund III operates as a global early-stage VC fund with investments across Europe, the United States, the MENA region, and Southeast Asia. The fund focuses on Pre-Seed, Seed, and Series A stages, with an investment strategy emphasizing early liquidity oriented portfolio construction.

By early 2026, TA Ventures had completed over 270 investments, with a portfolio including 17 unicorn companies and 8 public listings (IPOs).

=== Ukrainian Startup Fund ===
Tigipko served as chairwoman of the Advisory Board of the Ukrainian Startup Fund (USF), from the fund's inception in 2019. In this role, she participated in shaping the fund's strategy, governance framework, and evaluation processes for early-stage Ukrainian startups.

=== ICLUB and angel investing ===
In 2019, Tigipko founded ICLUB, an international angel investment syndicate enabling private investors to co-invest alongside TA Ventures.

Initially launched in Kyiv, ICLUB expanded to multiple regions across Europe, the Middle East, and Southeast Asia. During the COVID-19 pandemic, it transitioned into a fully digital investment platform, ICLUB.VC.

As of 2026, ICLUB includes more than 7,000 investors across 42 countries. The organization’s long-term mission is to support the education and development of up to 100,000 angel investors by 2037, particularly among Ukrainian and European investor communities.

=== Conferences, education and technology initiatives ===
From 2010 to 2015, Tigipko founded and organized IDCEE (Investor Day Central and Eastern Europe) in Kyiv. The conference became one of the largest startup and investment events in Central and Eastern Europe, hosting more than 2,000 participants annually from over 25 countries.

In 2013, she initiated Code Club UA ., the Ukrainian chapter of the global Code Club movement, providing free programming education for children aged 8–14.

In 2018, Tigipko co-founded Wtech, an international community of women leaders in technology and digital business, which grew to more than 10,000 members worldwide by 2026.

=== Film industry and cultural activity ===
In 2010, Tigipko founded the Odesa International Film Festival, which developed into one of the largest audience-focused film festivals in Eastern Europe.

Since 2017, she has served as Chair of the Supervisory Board of the Ukrainian Film Academy, which organizes the national film award Golden Dzyga and supports the international presence of Ukrainian cinema.

== Distinctions ==
- 2010: Ranked 23rd most successful business woman in Ukraine by Focus.ua
- 2011: Ranked 13th most influential women in Ukraine by Focus.ua
- 2012: Top 100 most influential Ukrainians
- 2012: Ranked 5th most influential person on the Ukrainian web by Ain.ua

== Personal life ==
She was married the Ukrainian politician and finance specialist Serhiy Tihipko in 2004 - 2018.
