= 8am scramble =

Phenomenon associated with GP practices in the United Kingdom

The 8am scramble, also known as the 8am rush, is a phenomenon associated with GP practices in the United Kingdom. In it, GP practices would open both their phone lines and online triage interfaces for new appointments promptly at 8am, and almost immediately close them again once the practice was "at capacity" for that day, acting as a de facto form of healthcare rationing. This was a major cause of patient dissatisfaction. This particularly affected older patients, who found it hard to compete in the "scramble".

This was caused by the combination of increasing patient needs due to an aging and expanding population, and lack of GP capacity due to retirement and lack of new supply. Those patients who failed to get a place in the "scramble" would either be forced to join the scramble the next day or seek treatment at urgent care or accident and emergency facilities. According to the UK government, 6.6% of patients unable to book GP appointments would seek emergency care rather than GP care as a result of this, further overleading emergency services.

On the introduction of the NHS app, the "scramble" phenomenon was seen there also, caused by patient familiarity with having to call at 8am.

In October 2025, the government ordered that practices in England would be required to keep their online booking interfaces open from 8am to 6:30pm Monday to Friday, in an attempt to eliminate the 8am scramble. This was part of the introduction of a new GP contract in England that provided extra resources for GP practices to deal with increased patient load.
