= EConsult =

Medical app

eConsult
- Original author: Hurley Group
- Type: Health Care
- License: Proprietary
- Website: econsult.net

eConsult is a medical app developed by the Hurley Group.

In June 2018, the practice announced that it planned to use the eConsult online system for most consultations. This enables patients to submit their symptoms to a GP electronically, and offers round the clock NHS self-help information, signposting to services, and a symptom checker. 12 GPs are using eConsult and it is planned to recruit 12 more, so patients will only be seen in person where necessary. 340 other practices are also using eConsult, a majority of the 479 GP practices are expected to have implemented an online consultation system by April 2018.

It was announced in October 2024 that the Hurley Group had sold eConsult to the digital solutions firm Huma for an undisclosed amount. The software was valued somewhere in the region of £41.5 million.

== Performance ==
Research published in 2018 in the British Journal of General Practice described a qualitative study of general practices in the West of England that piloted the e-consultation system. It concluded that "the technology, in its current form, fell short of providing an effective platform for clinicians to consult with patients and did not justify their financial investment in the system."

In 2022 it agreed a six-year contract with Mid and South Essex NHS Foundation Trust. This permits clinicians to ask referred patients a specialist list of questions, triaging them at the outpatients referral stage and permitting patients to send in information ahead of a visit and pre-book tests and appointments. This reduced the predicted waiting list clearance time from 20 years to three years while decreasing non-attendance from 40% to nearly zero.

Peterhead Health Centre stopped the use of its eConsult service from September 2022 due to "an ever increasing list size and growing demand" replacing it with a new tool developed by their GP’s where staff signpost patients to the most appropriate clinician in the most appropriate time frame.

== See also ==
- Electronic consultation
