= NHS app =

Mobile app of the National Health Service in England

The NHS App allows patients using the National Health Service in England to book appointments with their GP, order repeat prescriptions and access their GP record. The app can also be used to access NHS 111, set patients' data sharing preferences, and record organ donation preferences and end-of-life care preferences. All GPs in England are required to give their patients access to their health record via the NHS app. The app allows a user to manage healthcare services for others, such as parents or spouses.

Available since late 2018, the app was developed by NHS Digital and NHS England.

== Development ==
Health minister Jeremy Hunt laid down eight "challenges" for the development in September 2017:

- Symptom checking and triage
- Access to your medical records
- GP appointment booking
- Repeat prescription ordering
- Changing data sharing preferences
- Changing organ donation preferences
- Changing end of life care choices
- Promoting "approved apps" to patients

Hunt and his successor Matt Hancock stressed their support for the project. Hancock presented it as key to a radical overhaul of NHS technology. Hunt said it would mark "the death-knell of the 8am scramble for GP appointments that infuriates so many patients".

The app was piloted from October 2018, and plans were to roll it out across England in December 2018. Patients were to be sent a text message from their GP practice inviting them to download the app. It was released for testing in September 2018 in Liverpool, Staffordshire, Redditch and Bromsgrove, Wyre Forest and South Worcestershire, Wolverhampton, Hastings and Rother, and Bristol, North Somerset and Gloucestershire. Initially, it would offer symptom checking and triage; appointment booking; repeat prescription ordering; access to patient records; national data opt-out; and organ donation preference. The launch of the app was accompanied by a decision that the name NHS Choices was to be abandoned, and in future the NHS site was to be called "the NHS website". In November 2018, it was reported that although it would be publicly available in the App Store and Google Play store, as well as a desktop webpage by the end of December, it would be made operational to patients "one STP or one CCG at a time", a process which was expected to take several months.

From 2019, it was planned to support GP video consultations and connect to an Apple Watch or FitBit. Later development includes plans to link up with the NHS e-Referral Service to allow patients to book hospital or clinic appointments.

In January 2019, the app was available for downloading, but according to NHS England, GP practices would need to "review some of their system settings before they can go live". It was intended to be fully operational by 1 July 2019. The app uses the NHS login to verify the identity of users.

After the establishment in early 2019 of NHSX as a central IT department for the NHS, chief executive Matthew Gould stated that the app should not have any more features, but should be a platform allowing "other people innovate on top of it".

== Reception ==
The British Medical Association said in 2025 that there is a risk that reliance on the app would "discriminate or alienate" patients who did not have access to digital technology.

== Added features ==
Since 2020, facial verification can be used to authenticate new sign-ups to the app. To take advantage of this, users submit a photo from an official document such as a passport or a driving licence. The app's developers said this feature could also be used for COVID-19 "immunity passports" providing documented proof of users' immunity due to a past infection, an idea which proved controversial.

Since 17 May 2021, the app can display COVID-19 vaccination records, initially to assist users in proving their vaccination status when travelling overseas. In the following months, this feature was given the name 'NHS COVID Pass' and began to be used by venues and businesses in England.

The app has been further developed to allow users to manage healthcare services for others, such as parents or spouses.

== Statistics ==
As of December 2023, 33.6 million people were registered with the NHS app.

As of June 2021, the app had almost 5 million monthly users. In May and June 2021, over 1.2 million repeat prescriptions and 100,000 GP appointments were arranged through the app. By mid-July, eight weeks after the addition of COVID-19 vaccination status, over 10 million users had registered with the app. By June 2022 there were 28 million patients registered. In the year to May 2022, over 16 million repeat prescriptions were ordered, 1.3 million GP appointments were booked, GP records were viewed more than 90 million times and 277,000 organ donation decisions were registered.

== See also ==
- NHS COVID-19 – app for infectious contact tracking and alerting
