= Electronic referrals =

E-referrals or electronic referrals or electronic consultation is an electronic platform that enables the seamless transfer of patient information from a primary to a secondary treating practitioner's client management system. E-referrals have fast become the best replacement of paper-based referrals, and hold great potential toward the ultimate goal of seamless communication and information sharing between practitioners.

== Benefits ==
Electronic referrals can result in considerable benefits for service providers. Firstly at the patient level, e-referrals ensure significant improvements to follow-up care coordination by the creation of accurate and timely referrals. Medical decisions are enhanced as each provider involved has the full patient information available to them. Duplicate tests are eliminated as patient information is being shared from one provider to another. The speed of communication is improved by removing delays related to paper-based transmission, ensuring a faster response rate. Also transmission of referral information is secured, upholding Consumer privacy.

Benefits can also be seen beyond the patient level, e-referrals can improve practice productivity. Documentation quality is improved by removing the use of illegible handwriting as well as poor quality faxed documentation. E-referrals create a logical and standardised referral template. Auto-population of clinical information ensures referrals are more clinically complete. There are also significant long term operational cost savings between electronic and paper based referrals.

== Barriers ==
A variety of barriers exist that inhibit the electronic General practitioner referral pathway to secondary care. These include the high start-up costs such as that of hardware, software and training needed to produce, process, send and receive each electronic referral. Difficulties faced when integrating different information systems to allow technology interface. As well as a slow response due to a deep rooted resistance to change and new technologies.

== Architecture framework ==
Clinical Document Architecture (CDA) is an international standard developed by the organisation Health Level 7 International, outlining the unvarying structure and presentation for clinical documents like that of e-referrals. The CDA:

- Provides a consistent structure for e-referral clinical information
- Guarantees receiving systems can understand and interpret e-referral information
- Allows the automation process of forwarding e-referrals to the correct department.

== International review ==
The e-referral initiative has been acknowledged globally, with many countries having successfully adopted the system. Including Finland who implemented the e-referral in 1990, Denmark in 1995, Norway in 1996, Netherlands in 2001, New Zealand in 2007. and Australia in 2009.

Country Adopting E-referral System	Start Date (Approx)	Number of GPs	No. of e-referrals per year
Finland (Helsinki)	1990	200	67,000 (by 2002)
Finland (Oulu)	1991	10	2,000 (by 2002)
Denmark (MedCom-EDI*)	1995	2024	41% (by 2004)
Denmark	1995	2024	63% (by Nov 2008)
Norway (ELIN**)	1996	N/A	<25% (by Jan 2009)
Netherlands (ZorgDomai)	2001	100	5,000 (by Dec 2004)
Netherlands	2001	2,000 (by 2008)	N/A
UK	2015:06:15		N/A
New Zealand (Hutt Valley)	2007	34	>90% (by Jan 2009)
Australia	Jun 2009	30	N/A

* EDI - Electronic Data Interchange ** ELIN - Electronic Information Exchange

=== Finland ===
Finland was the first country to implement an e-referral system, introduced in the capital city of Helsinki in 1990. The e-referral project was put in place to allow for a more cost-effective way of treating a bigger number of patients, increase productivity and to improve access to healthcare. There were two hundred general practitioner practices and one million residents originally involved in the project. It took twelve years but by 2002, a total of sixty-seven thousand e-referrals had been sent.

=== Denmark ===
Denmark was the second country to introduce an electronic referral system. This was done so through a nationwide MedCom project implemented in 1995 entitled The Danish Health Care Data Network. This TeleMed project aimed to expand the electronic communication between health service parties, and e-referrals were a part of this. By 2004, forty-one percent of all referrals sent were electronic. Causing a "significant improvement in access to care, quality of care, efficiency and productivity of the health sector".

=== Norway ===
The use of e-referrals began in Norway in 1996, and has been much slower than that of other countries. By January 2009, less than twenty-five percent of all referrals were sent electronically. Remarkably lower than that of Denmark or Finland.

=== Netherlands ===
The development of e-referrals in the Netherlands began in 2001. With one hundred GP's initially involved, by December 2004 five thousand e-referrals had been sent.

=== New Zealand ===
The e-referral project was launched within New Zealand Hutt District in 2007. The project aimed to "provide complete and relevant referral information electronically and make it available to practitioners involved in the patient's care to allow prompt and appropriate clinical decision-making." By 2009, ninety percent of all referrals were electronic. The Hutt Valley District has been acknowledge as the leading district in electronic referrals in New Zealand by the Ministry of Health (New Zealand).

=== Australia ===
Most recent to initiate an e-referral system was Australia in June 2009. Approximately thirty General practitioners from the Australian Capital Territory used the electronic system to refer to sixty outpatient service specialists. With many plans underway to increase and expand to other nearby areas of Australia
