= Fabio Rosati =

Italian-born entrepreneur

- Born: Florence, Italy
- Education: Georgetown University
- Occupation: Internet entrepreneur

Fabio Rosati is an Italian-born American executive who was CEO of online work marketplace platforms Elance and Upwork, chair of hourly work marketplace Snagajob, and is chair of the on-demand manufacturing marketplace Xometry. Rosati is a contributor to online work, the freelance economy, and real-time hiring.

== Education and career ==
Originally from Florence, Italy, attended Georgetown University. Rosati joined Gemini Consulting (a division of Capgemini) in its early days and left a decade later to join a Silicon Valley start-up, Elance, as Chief Executive Officer. In 2006 Elance sold its enterprise software business to focus on a new platform where businesses and freelance talent could connect and collaborate with each other online. Among the largest and fastest-growing companies in the online work industry, Elance allowed businesses to find, hire, manage and pay freelancers. In 2013, Elance had over 3 million users, and over $300 million in annual billings. In December 2013, as Elance and oDesk announced their merger, Rosati was named CEO of Elance-oDesk. In April 2015, with more than 13 million users and $1B in annual billings, Elance-oDesk introduced a unified platform and a new name, Upwork. Rosati was on Upwork's board of directors until 2017, and is on the board of directors at Xometry.
