= Suffolk GP Federation =

English health organisation

Suffolk GP Federation is a GP Federation of 61 independent GP practices in Suffolk with a total registered population of 540,000. It is at present a registered community interest company, but is considering becoming one large partnership.

Dr Paul Driscoll is its chairman. It won a £10 million contract to provide a full community service for patients with diabetes for five years from April 2014. It offers diabetes screening, training and care for patients with a dedicated helpline and mobile dietetic, podiatry and antenatal clinics in the GP surgeries. It has helped to launch the Suffolk GP Fellowship scheme, which offers trainees a twelve month contract with training opportunities. It is intended to boost recruitment of GPs in the county.

It was founded in 2007 and now provides a portfolio of NHS-funded services in Suffolk and northeast Essex. These include:

1. Urgent care — out-of-hours, GP+ (weekend and evening booked appointments), ED streaming in Ipswich and West Suffolk hospitals and a minor injuries centre in Felixstowe. 2. Primary care - Unity GP practice in Haverhill. 3. Community services including ultrasound, cardiology, diabetes, podiatry, fracture prevention, bladder and bowel, and stoma.

It also has a portfolio of Suffolk primary care support services including GP and nurse retention and support, training and development and other member services.

It runs a service called Suffolk GP+ which offers appointments to patients on bank holidays and out of hours. Patients attending the A&E department at Ipswich Hospital and a West Suffolk Hospital, who are assessed as have minor ailments are offered an appointment with the service, which has access to their GP record. £2 million from the Prime Minister’s Challenge Fund finances the service.

It launched Suffolk Primary Care in April 2017. This is a partnership of 12 GP practices with a total of 102,529 registered patients. It plans to implement new care models using pharmacists, physiotherapists and other professionals to support doctors.

It took over the Christmas Maltings & Clements Practice in Haverhill in May 2017.
