= Doctors in Distress =

British health charity

Doctors in Distress is a British charity established in 2019 with a primary mission to reduce the prevalence of burnout and suicides among healthcare professionals in the United Kingdom. The organisation's inception was a response to the suicide of Dr Jagdip Sidhu, a cardiologist, in November 2018. This event deeply impacted his brother, Amandip Sidhu, who founded the charity. Doctors in Distress is dedicated to raising awareness of the significant pressures faced by medical practitioners and fostering more compassionate and supportive work environments where healthcare professionals can openly discuss challenges such as stress and mental health.

The organisation offers various services, including webinars, workshops, and facilitated peer support groups where healthcare professionals can openly discuss the emotional impact of their work and seek support from their peers in a safe, judgment free environment.

Author and former doctor Adam Kay joined the organisation as a patron in 2023.

Dame Clare Gerada is patron of the charity, and has a varied trustee board consisting of doctors and lay persons, as well as a cohort of ambassadors.

The suicide rate among doctors is estimated at between two and five times higher than for the general population.

As of the Summer of 2025, Doctors in Distress had assisted more than 6,000 healthcare professionals.
