= Freeads.co.uk =

Classified advertisements website

- Freeads - your local marketplace
- Website type: Classifieds Website
- Available in: English
- Owner: Freeads Classifieds Ltd.
- Website: www.freeads.co.uk
- Commercial: Yes
- Registration: Only required for advertisers
- Launched: 13 January 1995

Freeads.co.uk is an online classifieds website in the UK, and part of Freeads Classifieds Ltd. group and are owned by private investors. Covering over 50 cities across the United Kingdom, Freeads.co.uk was voted the 7th in Harris Interactive's Spring 2011 survey in the "Classifieds & consumer to consumer marketplaces" behind the likes of eBay and Amazon.

== Background ==
Freeads is a UK classified ads and community marketplace. It connects buyers and sellers of second hand furniture, homewares, garden goods, vehicles, property, jobs and rehomes pets.

Advertising on FreeAds.co.uk is free with paid upgrades available depending on the product category and the geographical market. Sellers may promote their listing through featured placements.

== History ==
In 2001, FreeAds was founded as an incubator project by seed investors, then trading as Freeads.net. On the 14th of May, 2002, the company was properly formed and rebranded as Freeads.co.uk.

In 2007, Channel 4 announced a partnership with FreeAds, where they would display online third-party adverts on the FreeAds website as part of a push "to treble the number of ads on the website in coming months". By July of the same year, it had been described as "the fastest growing classified website in the UK".

Former Lastminute.com staff Duncan Horton and Stuart Parish were added to the team in April 2007, as Chief Executive and Marketing Director respectively, joining Clive Jacobs (chairman) as the senior staff of the company. Daniel Newman was appointed as director on February 7, 2012, then terminated on November 21, 2017.

== Controversy ==
FreeAds is noted as one of many websites used by illicit dog breeders to sell pets illegally, with one such case earning the seller over £90,000. These dogs often have behavioural issues, illnesses, and health conditions, and are commonly unvaccinated. The Daily Mirror also found over 1,300 "bully dogs" on the site, claiming that the breeding of such dogs is "irresponsible" and often illegal. Many of the bully-type dogs are cross-breeds originating from breeds that are "banned [...] under the 1991 Dangerous Dogs Act."
