= Snagajob =

U.S. jobs marketplace platform

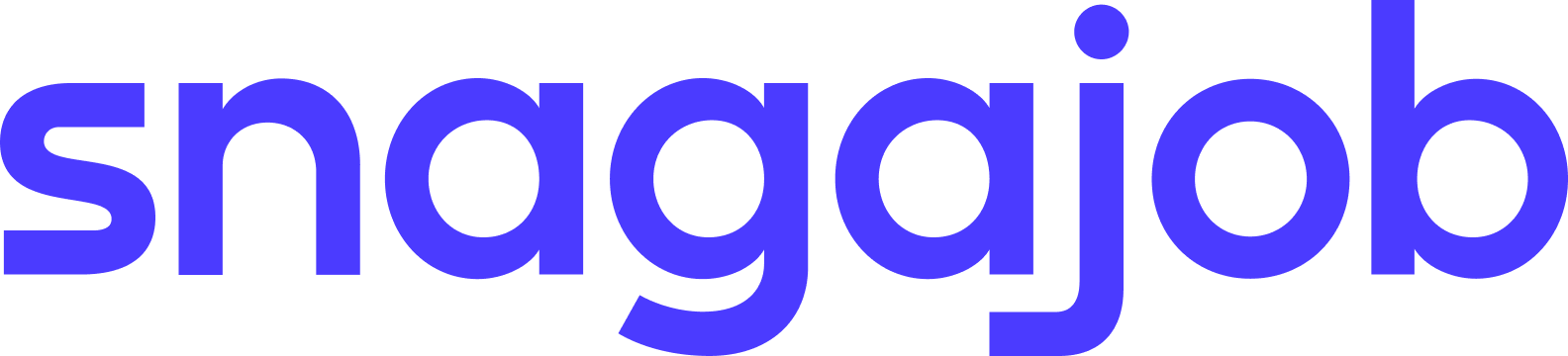
- Type: Private
- Industry: Online marketplace
- Founded: 2000
- Founder: Shawn Boyer
- Headquarters: Glen Allen, Virginia, United States
- Website: www.snagajob.com

Snagajob is an online marketplace for hourly work for U.S. job seekers and employers. The company was founded in 2000 and is headquartered in Glen Allen, Virginia.

== History ==
Shawn Boyer launched Snagajob.com out of his home in Washington, D.C., and served as Snagajob's CEO from the website's launch in early 2000 to 2013.

Peter Harrison was named chief executive officer of Snagajob in April 2013 and served until July 2018.

In June 2016, Snagajob acquired PeopleMatter, a company that develops and provides software tools that help employers manage their workforce.

In 2017, Snagajob launched a shift-specific app focused on hourly jobs in central Virginia. The app was originally call HUSL. The product has since been rebranded as Snag Work and most recently as Shifts by Snagajob. It opened a second location for shift work in the Washington DC area in 2018.

On April 3, 2018, Snagajob changed its name to Snag.

Fabio Rosati was named Chairman and CEO of Snagajob in July 2018. In June 2019, Rosati took on the role of Executive Chairman of the Board, and Mathieu Stevenson was appointed Chief Executive Officer.

In November 2019, Snagajob returned to its original name.

Shifts by Snagajob officially launched in Dallas in 2019 and Orlando in February 2020.

In October 2021, Snagajob sold PeopleMatter and Hiring Manager to Fourth Enterprises, the parent company of HotSchedules and Fourth.

In December 2022, Keith Forshew was named Chief Executive Officer.

In November 2024, the Boston-based startup JobGet acquired Snagajob. In a press release, Forshew stated that Snagajob’s operations would continue under JobGet.

== See also ==
- Employment website
