= Thomas Register =

USA and Canada supplier and product sourcing online platform

Thomasnet
- 1905 Thomas' Register of American Manufacturers
- Formerly: Thomas' Register of American Manufacturers
- Type: Subsidiary
- Predecessor: ThomasRegister.com
- Founded: 1898; 128 years ago
- Founder: Harvey Mark Thomas
- Headquarters: New York City, New York, United States
- Area served: Worldwide
- Key people: Randy Altschuler, CEO
- Products: Online marketplace
- Parent: Xometry (2021-present); Thomas Publishing (1898-2021)
- Website: www.thomasnet.com

Thomas and Thomasnet, formerly Thomas' Register of American Manufacturers, is an online B2B procurement platform for supplier and product sourcing in the U.S. and Canada. Its Thomas Network hosts over 500,000 vetted industrial product suppliers, distributors, manufacturers and service companies.

Initially published in 1898, as Hardware and Kindred Trades, The Thomas' Register of American Manufacturers began publishing in 1914, and became known as the Thomas Register, the Thomas Registry, and the "Big Green Books". The company moved its database solely online in 2006, continuing as Thomasnet.com. It was acquired by Xometry in 2021.

== History ==
The books were first published in 1898 by Harvey Mark Thomas, as Hardware and Kindred Trades. In its heyday, Thomas' Register of American Manufacturers was a 34-volume buying guide of detailed sourcing information on industrial products and service from thousands of manufacturers.

The Thomas Regional Directory Company began as a division of Thomas Publishing Company in 1976. Thomas Regional Industrial Buying Guides provided information, in print and on CD-ROM, on local OEMs, distributors, MRO services and other custom manufacturers in 19 regional editions, covering much of the U.S. It began offering Dialog access in 1984, and online access in 1995, as ThomasRegister.com.

Its 100th and final print edition was published in 2006, with its proprietary database moved fully online as Thomasnet.com, published and operated by Thomas Publishing subsidiary Thomas Industrial Network. The Thomasnet network expanded, adding online catalogs, CAD drawings, research, and news and analytics, becoming the largest industrial sourcing platform.

In April 2006, the New York Public Library (NYPL) named Thomasnet.com as one of its 25 Best of Reference sources for the reference librarian. It remains listed among the NYPL's "Best of the Web" companies for industry information.

Since 2010, the company has been a strategic partner of GlobalTrade.net, a marketplace for international trade service providers. In 2017, it partnered with Dun & Bradstreet, developing Supplier Evaluation & Risk Reports to improve supplier risk assessments in procurement.

In May 2021, the Thomasnet platform had over 500,000 suppliers and 1.3 million active registered users. That December, Thomas was acquired by Xometry, which operates the Thomasnet online Thomas Network; Thomas Marketing; and a news and analysis division, Thomas Insights.

A number of Xometry Marketplace features were integrated into the Thomasnet.com platform in 2022, including its instant quoting engine and Workcenter. By 2024, the company was digitizing and introducing AI-powered searching.

The Thomasnet International Organization for Standardization (ISO) American manufacturers database is included in the "Made in America Manufacturing Initiative" searchable portal launched by the Small Business Administration in 2025. In 2026, it launched AI-driven "smart search" and advertising tools to acelerate the industrial buying process.

== Research ==
Thomasnet publishes industry research, white papers, a Thomas Insights daily newsletter, the Thomas Industry Update, and a weekly Thomas Index Report. In 2000, Thomasnet News released Industry Market Trends (IMT), its first journal. The IMT published editorials, interviews, and long-form journalism on issues ranging from career skills, developments in the industry, and discussions with leading experts. IMT Green & Clean was launched in response to the growing interest in green technology. In 2011, the IMT Machining Journal was launched followed by the IMT Fluid & Gas Flow Journal, the IMT Career Journal, and the IMT Procurement Journal. From 2010, it issued an annual Industry Market Barometer (IMB) survey.
