= Clare Gerada =

British-Maltese general practitioner (born 1959)

The Right Honourable The Baroness Gerada DBE FRCPsych FRCGP
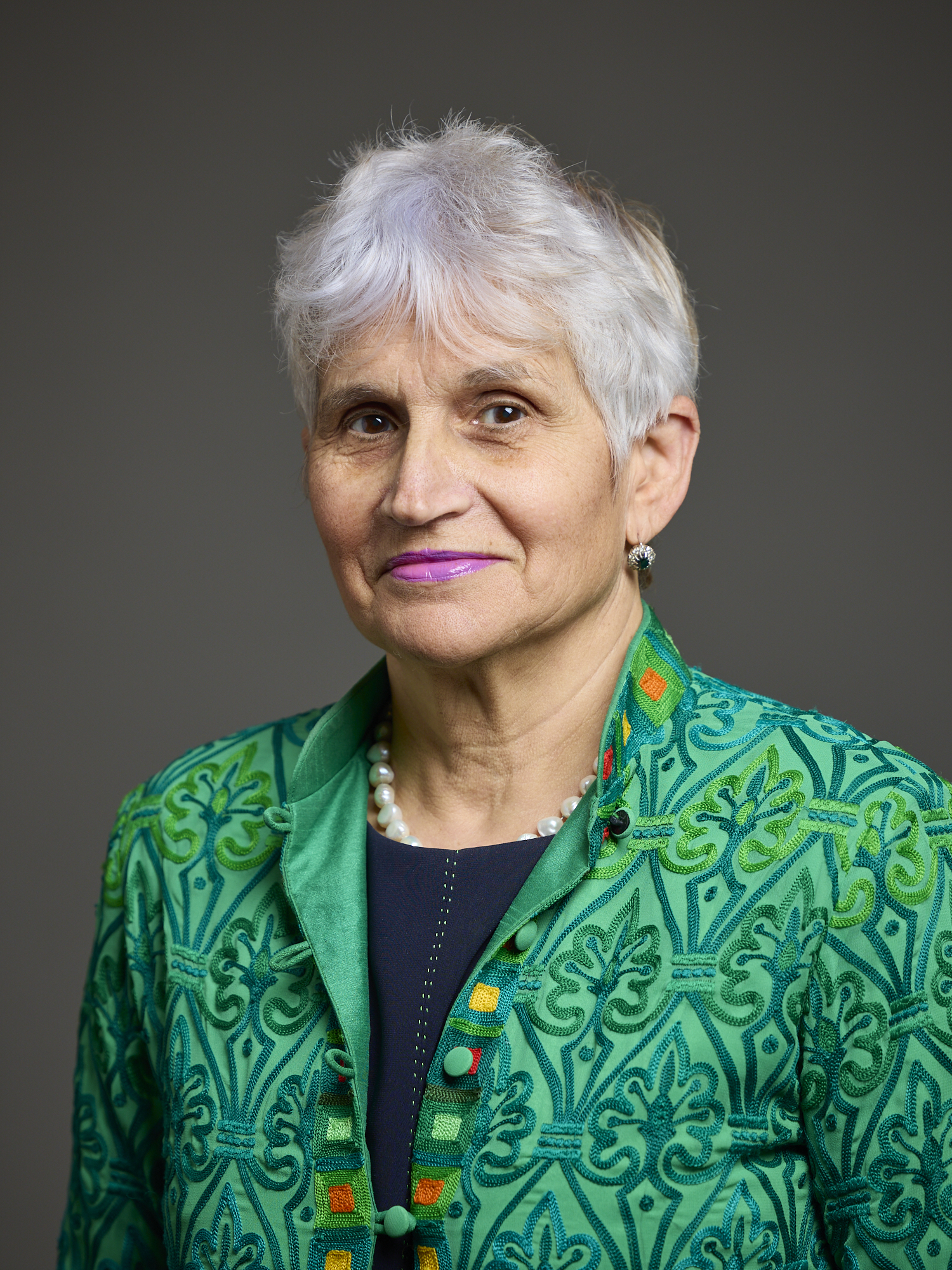
- Official portrait, 2026
- Born: Clare Mary Louise Francis Gerada; November 1959 (age 66–67); Nigeria
- Citizenship: British and Maltese
- Education: MB BS, 1983, UCL Medical School
- Occupation: General practitioner
- Known for: Chairperson of RCGP
- Spouse: Sir Simon Wessely
- Children: 2
- Medical career
- Profession: Medical doctor
- Sub-specialties: Mental health (especially of health care workers), substance misuse, and problem gambling

Member of the House of Lords
- Lord Temporal
- Life peerage 24 November 2025

Personal details
- Party: Crossbench

Clare Mary Louise Francis Gerada, Baroness Gerada DBE FRCPsych FRCGP (born November 1959) is a British and Maltese London-based general practitioner who is a former president of the Royal College of General Practitioners (RCGP) and a former chairwoman of the RCGP Council (2010–2013). She has professional interests in mental health, substance misuse, and gambling problems. In 2025, she was made a life peer.

== Early life ==
Gerada was born in Nigeria in 1959 to Maltese parents. The family moved to the United Kingdom in 1963. Her father, Anthony Gerada, was a general practitioner. He opened a single-handed practice in Peterborough.

== Medical career ==
Gerada qualified in medicine at UCL Medical School in 1983. She then trained in psychiatry and worked at the Maudsley Hospital in south London. She qualified as a GP in 1992 and started work in general practice in Lambeth, London, the same year.

She has cited her main areas of work as being around mental health and substance misuse. She has spent her professional career leading the development of primary care substance (alcohol, drugs) services in England. In 2000, she established the Substance Misuse Unit at the RCGP. She has been Director of Primary Care for the National Clinical Governance Team and Senior Medical Advisor to the Department of Health. She is one of the partners in the Hurley Group, which runs many GP practices and walk-in centres across London.

In November 2010, she became chairperson of the Council of the Royal College of General Practitioners for a three-year term. She was the college's first female chairperson for 50 years, the previous female chairperson having been Dame Annis Gillie.

In September 2013, she was appointed as the chairperson of the Clinical Board, Primary Care Transformation, NHS England (London Region), to take up the position the following month. She resigned from this position in April 2015 so she could speak out against what she calls the Conservatives' "desperate quest for privatisation".

In April 2016, she was elected to the council of the Council of the British Medical Association (BMA).

She established the Practitioner Health Programme to support general practitioners, dentists and other health professionals with mental health and associated issues. In March 2019, the Care Quality Commission rated the service outstanding.

In September 2016, she was named as one of the Liberal Democrats' "new Beveridge group" of advisers. She had been a lifelong supporter of the Labour Party until the 2016 United Kingdom European Union membership referendum.

In 2019, Gerada established the NHS Primary Care Gambling Service, a service delivering care to those affected by gambling related harms. The service works closely with a number of third sector (charitable) providers as well as general practitioners. In 2020, she published the book, Beneath the White Coat: Doctors, Their Minds and Mental Health, and in 2024, Handbook of Physician Mental Health.

In August 2021, she was elected as RCGP president, succeeding Amanda Howe, and taking up the role on 20 November 2021 for a two-year term.

She is a patron and past chair of the charity Doctors in Distress, which aims to reduce suicides amongst doctors and other health care workers. It was set up after the suicide of cardiologist Dr Jagdip Sidhu, in 2018. In October 2025, Gerada was nominated for a life peerage by the House of Lords Appointments Commission to sit as a crossbench peer in the House of Lords. She was created Baroness Gerada, of Kennington in the London Borough of Lambeth on 24 November 2025.

=== Media appearances ===
- In February 2012, she appeared in the BBC Radio 4 series Great Lives, nominating Vera Brittain.
- In February 2013, she was assessed as one of the 100 most powerful women in the United Kingdom by Woman's Hour on BBC Radio 4.
- On 29 March 2013, she appeared on BBC Radio 4's Any Questions?, which was broadcast from St. George's Chapel, Chatham.
- On 13 May 2013, she debated the NHS with Chris Skidmore MP on BBC's Daily Politics.
- She was named as one of the "top 500 Influential Britons" by The Sunday Times and Debrett's in January 2014, and number 4 in Health.
- On 19 January 2023, she appeared on the BBC Question Time panel.
- In 2024, she debuted at the Edinburgh Fringe with "50 Minutes to Save the NHS," a comedy show promoted as such. She performed 17 shows over 16 days alongside her co-presenter, Dr. Phil Hammond. All proceeds were donated to Doctors in Distress.

== Personal life ==
Gerada is married to Sir Simon Wessely, a professor of psychiatry. He was knighted in 2013.

She was one of the first people in the UK to self-isolate publicly when she contracted coronavirus during a trip to New York in March 2020. She described it as the "worst illness I've ever had".

She gave an interview from home to Good Morning Britain, which entertained viewers when she was interrupted by her phone and her dog. In her spare time, Gerada is a keen bridge player.

== Awards and honours ==
- Fellow of the Royal College of General Practitioners
- Member and Honorary Fellow of the Royal College of Psychiatrists
- Fellow of the Royal College of Physicians
- 2012, Honorary member of Malta's National Order of Merit
- 2015, Honorary Fellowship University of London
- 2017, William Pickles Medal, Royal College of General Practitioners
- 2018, Doubleday Award: contribution to patient involvement
- 2019, Royal Society of Medicine Wall of Honour
- 2020, Association of Anaesthetists Award
- 2021, Medical Professional Liability Association Humanitarian Award
- 2022, Life Fellow of the Institute of Group Analysis
- 2022, British International Doctors Association (BIDA) Special Award
- 2023, Honorary Doctorate, Royal College Surgeons of Ireland
- 2023, Honorary Fellowship, Royal College Public Health
- 2024, Visiting Professor Institute of Medicine, University of Bolton
- 2024, Medal for Moral Impact, Institute of Medical Ethics

Gerada was appointed Member of the Order of the British Empire (MBE) in the 2000 Birthday Honours for service to medicine and to drug misusers, and Dame Commander of the Order of the British Empire (DBE) in the 2020 Birthday Honours for services to general practice.

== Selected publications ==
- Gerada, Clare (2020). Beneath the white coat: doctors, their minds and mental health (1 ed.). Routledge. ISBN 978-1138499737.
- Gerada, Clare (2024). Handbook of Physician Mental Health. Routledge. ISBN 978-1032479866.
