= Farmigo =

Internet platform

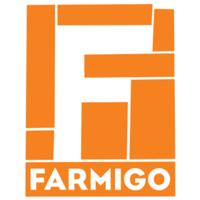
- Farmigo Logo (as of 2014)
- Industry: Online Grocery
- Founded: 2009
- Founder: Benzi Ronen, Yossi Pik
- Headquarters: Palo Alto, California
- Website: www.farmigo.com

Farmigo was an online farmers' market that connected consumers, workplaces, schools, apartment complexes and community centers directly to local farms. It operated in three locations, Seattle-Tacoma, the Bay Area, and greater New York City. The company was a certified B Corporation and raised $8 million in Series B financing led by Sherbrooke Capital and RSF Social Finance joined by Series A lead investor Benchmark Capital.

== History ==
Farmigo was founded in 2009 by Founder and CEO Benzi Ronen and Co-Founder Yossi Pik as a cloud-based software system for farms to manage their community supported agriculture (CSA) subscriptions. According to TreeHugger, Farmigo has provided technology to "hundreds of CSA farms in 25 states and has connected them to more than 3,000 communities." Since 2009, Farmigo has helped CSA farms deliver more than 30 million pounds of produce to over 100,000 families. In December 2012, the company launched Farmigo food communities which leverages their existing relationships with farms to accelerate the adoption of an "alternative food system" beyond the 1 percent participating in CSAs.

In July 2016, the company announced the closure of its delivery service and that it would focus on its CSA Software Management platform instead. In September 2021, the firm was acquired by GrubMarket.

== Business model ==
Using technology and a community-based business model, Farmigo connected local farms directly to consumers through food communities—such as workplaces, schools, apartment complexes and community centers. According to Upstart Business Journal, food communities are started and led by community Organizers who serve as catalysts for an alternative food system. Organizers sign up through Farmigo's website, rally members to join their food community and work with regional Farmigo representatives to manage delivery and pick up to their site. According to Fast Company, once a food community is established, members can order their selection online from a variety of local farms and have it delivered weekly or bi-weekly to their food community site.

Farmigo coordinated with complimentary local farms located within 100 miles of a community to deliver food harvested within 48 hours of drop off.

== Locations ==
- Brooklyn, NY
