= GP federation =

GP Federations became popular among English general practitioners after 2010 as a means to exploit the opportunities—or mitigate the threats—posed by the Five Year Forward View proposals in the English NHS which envisaged delivering primary care at a larger scale than the traditional GP list. It is widely believed that ‘Practices cannot survive on their own – they have to look at ways of making themselves stronger.’ 15 sites were selected in December 2015 to test new enhanced primary care models serving populations of 30,000 to 50,000 patients. Some, but by no means all, clinical commissioning groups have given financial support to encourage the formation of federations.

As the British Medical Association explains there are many names and many organisational forms: federations, networks, collaborations, joint ventures, alliances. By 2017 it appeared that GP Federations were the commonest titles for collaborative arrangements which fall short of full merger or partnerships. Both the BMA and the Royal College of General Practitioners were keen to support such developments, the RCGP having encouraged them since 2008.

In January 2019 NHS England told clinical commissioning groups that they must establish primary care networks, typically covering 30-50,000 people, in their areas by 30 June. £1.50 per head of population per year is to be committed to ‘developing and maintaining’ them. The plan says networks 'will comprise a range of staff such as GPs, pharmacists, district nurses, community geriatricians, dementia workers and AHPs such as physiotherapists and podiatrists/chiropodists, joined by social care and the voluntary sector'. It is expected that the GP contract will be changed to require every practice to join one, and that all local enhanced services will be funded through the networks.

== Active federations ==
- Abingdon Health Federation
- Alliance for Better Care
- Barnsley Healthcare Federation
- Battersea Healthcare CIC
- Bolton GP Federation
- Brighton and Hove Integrated Care Service
- Bury GP Federation - 30 of the town's 33 General Practices
- Cambs GP Network Ltd (Cambridgeshire)
- Camden Health Partners
- City and Hackney GP Confederation
- Conexus Healthcare (Wakefield)
- Coventry & Rugby GP Alliance
- Croydon GP Collaborative
- Durham Dales Health Federation
- Ealing GP Federation
- East Leicestershire and Rutland GP Federation
- Encompass (Canterbury)
- The Fareham & Gosport Primary Care Alliance Limited.
- Fedbucks
- GPCARE Services Ltd (Heywood, Middleton and Rochdale)
- GP Healthcare Alliance Ltd (Essex)
- GP Health Connect Ltd (Halton - Runcorn & Widnes)
- Greater Peterborough Network Ltd
- Hadrian Primary Care Alliance. (Northumberland)
- Haringey GP Federation (Haringey, London)
- Hammersmith and Fulham GP Federation.
- Hartlepool and Stockton Health
- Healthbridge Direct Ltd (Redbridge)
- Healthstone Medical (Poole)
- Hinckley and Bosworth Medical Alliance.
- Iceni Healthcare Ltd. (Norfolk and Suffolk)
- Invicta Health (Kent)
- Islington GP Federation
- Kernow CIC (Cornwall)
- Leeds GP Confederation
- Lincolnshire and District Medical Services
- Liverpool GP Provider Organisation
- Manchester Primary Care Partnership Ltd
- Mid Hampshire Healthcare Ltd https://www.midhampshirehealthcare.co.uk/index.htm
- Modality Partnership (Sandwell and Birmingham)
- Newcastle GP Services
- North West Leicestershire GP Federation
- Nottingham City GP Alliance
- One Care (BNSSG) C.I.C (Bristol, North Somerset and South Gloucestershire)
- One Wight Health Ltd.
- OxFed (Oxford)
- Panacea Collaborative
- Pennine GP Alliance (Calderdale)
- Portsmouth Primary Care Alliance
- Primary Care Sheffield
- Procare Health Limited (Guildford)
- Richmond GP Alliance (Richmond on Thames)
- Rowan Healthcare Ltd (Huddersfield)
- Salus Medical Services (North East Hampshire and Farnham)
- South Islington GP Alliance
- South Warwickshire GP Federation
- Stellar Healthcare (Epping Forest and Harlow)
- Suffolk GP Federation
- SSP Health (North West England)
- SW Healthcare (South Worcestershire)
- Sunderland GP Alliance Ltd.
- Taurus HealthCare Ltd. (Hereford)
- Tower Family Healthcare (Bury)
- TyneHealth (North Tyneside)
- Uttlesford Health Ltd
- Viaduct Health (Stockport)
- Warrington Health Plus
- Warrington Primary Care Collaborative Limited
- West Wakefield Health and Wellbeing federation.
- WF Federated GP Network Limited. (Waltham Forest)
- Wyre Forest Health Partnership
- YorDales Health Ltd (Airdale)

Yorkshire Health Network - covers all 17 practices within NHS Harrogate and Rural District

== Defunct Federations ==
Danum Medical Services Ltd, set up in Doncaster by 23 local shareholding practices went into administration in March 2016 after losing contracts for an extended hours hub and GP out-of-hours services.

Horizon Health Choices Ltd. in Bedfordshire went bankrupt in November 2016. It was forced to employ locum doctors which proved unsustainably expensive.
