= Biosphere Corporation =

Ukrainian manufacturer

- Industry: Production, Distribution
- Founded: 1997
- Headquarters: Dnipro, Ukraine
- Areas served: Europe, Asia, South America, Africa
- Products: household products, personal care and hygiene, professional supplies AFH
- Revenue: 11,496,700 hryvnia (2025)
- Total assets: 30,532,800 hryvnia (2025)
- Owner: Andriy Zdesenko. Minority Owners — Vladislav Guristrymba, Iryna Nesterenko
- Number of employees: more than 3000
- Website: http://biosphere-corp.com/

Biosphere Corporation is a Ukrainian manufacturer and distributor of household and hygiene products, founded in 1997 by Andriy Zdesenko. The production facilities are represented by 4 plants. Biosphere owns a large polyethylene waste processing plant in Fastiv, Ukraine. It produces the first in Ukraine 100% biodegradable bags. The company's head office is located in Dnipro.

Since 2018, the company is among the TOP-100 most expensive Ukrainian brands. As of 2019, 3 brands of the company are among the TOP-100 most expensive Ukrainian brands.

The corporation's portfolio includes 13 own (Freken BOK, Smile, PRO service, Novita, Vortex, Superfresh, LikeIt, Bambik, etc.) and 10 distributed brands (Selpak, Tork, Lifestyles, etc.).

== History ==
Corporation started its activity in 1997 with distribution of brand products of international companies: Kotex, Huggies, Libresse, Bella, Nichols and others.

In 2001, the own brand of household products and cooking accessories Freken BOK was founded.

In 2002, the first in-house production was opened — the KPD facility in Dnipro.

In 2007, the company started implementing Private Label projects for other brands.

In 2008, production and logistics complex Thermoplast was opened in Letychiv, Khmelnitskyi region, Ukraine

In 2010, the Vortex trademark was created. Biosphere Professional (PRO service brand) was launched in the professional goods segment (away from home market). Biosphere's own production of wet wipes opened later the same year. Since 2012, it has been undergoing an annual audit of Walt Disney and Universal.

In 2014, Biosphere opened Ukraine's largest recycling plant Polygreen in Fastiv. The processing capacity is about 800 tons per month.

In 2015, Biosphere has opened a joint venture with Groupe Lemoine (France) and started a state-of-the-art production of cotton products in Estonia to be exported Europe-wide.

In August 2018, the corporation presented a new Smile baby line of cosmetics licensed by The Walt Disney Company. Active expansion into the markets of Scandinavia, the Baltic States and Poland has also begun.

In April 2019, a new pet care product brand, LikeIt, was established.

In January, 2020, the corporation started the first production of fully biodegradable and compostable garbage bags in Ukraine. The Go Green project, which combines biodegradable and / or organic products with minimal environmental impact, has expanded to include a number of corporate products — organic cotton sheets, washable with wet toilet paper and the first damp cotton cloth napkins.

In 2020 started to export to England, USA, Israel, Switzerland, Spain, Bulgaria, Romania, Tanzania, Tajikistan, Uzbekistan.

In 2020 the company has launched its own diapers production and the first brand in diaper's product line — Bambik.

In a missile attack on Dnipro in April 2025 one of the companies warehouses was directly hit and destroyed. The attack killed one of Biosphere Corporation's employees and caused a fire that covered 6,000 square metre.

=== Production capacity ===
- The KPD plant is the first and the biggest corporation's factory located in Dnipro, Ukraine.
- Polygreen Recycling Plant in Fastiv recycles 800 tons of polyethylene waste every month.
- The Lemoine plant in Estonia processes 20 tons of cotton a day. The equipment allows to manufacture 108 cosmetic cotton disks per minute.

== Social activity ==
In 2018, the Biosphere became a general partner of World Cleanup Day and volunteered 175,000 garbage bags made of 100% recycled polyethylene.

In May 2018, the company organized the first in Ukraine plogging in Dnipro. Subsequently, similar races took place in Kyiv, Lviv and Minsk.

The corporation cooperates with many charitable foundations and is a partner of a number of children's charity festivals: Cities of Professions, Charity Weekend, Leopolis Jazz Fest Children's Program, "Mom + I", Wings of Hope and others.

At the end of 2019, the Biosphere became the organizer of an exhibition of paintings by 9-year-old Iryna Khymich with premature aging syndrome.

In April 2020 in collaboration with Ukrainian doctors Biosphere has developed a specially designed plastic bag that helps COVID-19 patients in critical condition to breathe. The corporation has dispatched 2,500 of these bags to over 100 hospitals in 65 cities in Ukraine for free as a part of a charity project.

== Awards ==
- In 2020 Biosphere's household brand FrekenBOK won the HWB Awards 2019 established by Watsons.
- The Selpak brand wins the 2016 Choice of the Year contest from 2016 to 2019.
- In 2016, the Biosphere received the national “Made-in-Ukraine” Award.
- TM Freken BOK won the Choice of the Year Award in 2006, 2011, 2013 years in Ukraine, and in 2018 — in Belarus.
