= Openbay =

American online automotive marketplace

Openbay, Inc.
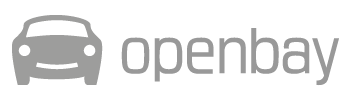
- Type: Private
- Industry: Internet; Automotive
- Founded: Cambridge, Massachusetts, United States (January 2012)
- Founder: Rob Infantino
- Headquarters: Cambridge, Massachusetts, United States
- Area served: United States
- Key people: Rob Infantino (CEO)
- Services: CAR services
- Website: www.openbay.com

Openbay is an online automotive services platform for auto repair, maintenance and car care services and a provider of SaaS solutions for the automotive service industry. in the United States. The company is headquartered in Cambridge, Massachusetts. It was founded by CEO, Rob Infantino, in 2012.

== Product ==
Vehicle owners enter their need for service or describe the repair, maintenance, or car care need. The Openbay platform automatically generates multiple competitive price estimates from local automotive service professionals. Vehicle owners then compare each automotive service professional based on location, amenities, pricing, and customer ratings. Services include repair, maintenance, collision, auto body, car washes, glass replacement and repair, and roadside assistance services. Consumers book an appointment with the service provider of their choice. Payment for services is processed onsite by the professional that serviced the vehicle. More than 70% of Openbay users do not select the lowest-priced service provider. Openbay charges a flat booking fee to the repair shop upon completion of the service.
