= SSP Health =

- Industry: General practice
- Founder: Shikha Pitalia
- Headquarters: England
- Area served: North West of England
- Owner: Shikha Pitalia

SSP Health is the largest provider of primary care GP services in the North West of England. As of 2014 it was one of only three such organisations in England serving more than 140,000 patients.

== History ==
According to the company website, the company was founded in 2002 by Shikha Pitalia, MBChB MRCGP and her husband, Sanjay Pitalia, also a GP. As of 2023, the company employs around 500 people and "runs 40 practises" treating about 150,000 patients.

In 2013 SSP took over 22 practices in Liverpool and the Metropolitan Borough of Sefton, adding to the 17 practices it was already running. The contract was worth £26.7 million over three years. In 2016, only 5 of 20 contracts were renewed with SSP Health, which the Liverpool Echo called a "controversial private health firm". The secretary of Liverpool Local Medical Committee described the contracts in May 2016 as "unworkable" and said they did not "stack up financially".

When the firm first took over the practices, many of them were already struggling due to poor management and funding previously. The firm employed locums staff as they worked to rectify the problems inherited from the previous contract holders.

In 2002, SSP Health pioneered 'federated General Practice', In 2023, the NHS Lancashire and South Cumbria Integrated Care Board (ICB) awarded the contract to run a Health Centre near Chorley to SSP as preferred bidder by a small margin, angering patients. Staff have said they were "ready to resign" over the SSP Health takeover. In February 2023, the NHS reversed its decision apologizing for the lack of public consultation in the process. SSP threatened legal action against "individuals who have made false or defamatory statements". This despite making millions over the last two financial years whilst refusing to treat people awaiting help from the Gender Service, they even joke they are 'right on' with the LGBTQi community.

All practices inspected by the Care Quality Commission while part of SSP Health received a rating of "Good" or "Outstanding".

== Unsourced information ==
SSP Health currently manages 37 GP surgeries aligned to 30 practices across 10 NHS Clinical Commissioning Groups in Greater Manchester, Lancashire, Cheshire, Merseyside and Cumbria. The company employs around 500 people and has a head office in Ashton-in-Makerfield, Wigan. It cares for approximately 150,000 patients across all of its sites.

Since 2004, SSP Health has pioneered the role of Practice Champions to improve patient outcomes and quality of life. Each practice is required to have nominated Cancer Champion and Carer Champion.

In 2006, Shikha Pitalia devised an Acute Visiting Scheme for SSP Health, which won a number of awards. It was a much more efficient way to organise GP home visits. It has been used by its practices ever since and has now become a model for much of general practice in the UK.

In 2009, Shikha Pitalia - who is Secretary of the British International Doctors Association, Wigan division, supporting education and welfare for doctors from diverse backgrounds - co-founded SSP Health Charitable Trust with Sanjay Pitalia, raising funds for local, national and international health-related charities. All her income for work done for Wigan's CCG and GP Alliance goes directly into the Trust.

In 2019-20, despite the COVID-19 outbreak, 23 of SSP Health's practices attained a 100% score in their Quality and Outcomes Framework . Four more practices achieved more than 99%.

Shikha Pitalia is Chair of Wigan GP Alliance and sits on the Healthier Wigan Partnership Board. Healthier Wigan is a partnership of NHS Wigan Borough Clinical Commissioning Group, Wigan Council Wigan Council, Bridgewater Community Healthcare NHS Foundation Trust, Wrightington, Wigan and Leigh NHS Foundation Trust, North West Boroughs Healthcare NHS Foundation Trust and GP practices from across the borough (62 practices) and wider partners to improve services in Wigan and achieve better health outcomes for local people.
