= Hum Mart =

Pakistani online supermarket chain

- Industry: e-Commerce
- Founded: 2018; 8 years ago
- Defunct: 2020
- Headquarters: Karachi, Pakistan
- Area served: Pakistan
- Products: Groceries and consumer products
- Website: hummart.com

Hum Mart was a Pakistani online store operated by Hum Network. It became defunct in 2020.

It was founded in 2018 by Malik Faisal Qayyum and Duraid Qureshi. It first started operations as an online retail grocery store across Karachi and now it is also selling additional categories of consumer products like mobile phones, electronics, cosmetics, and toys across Pakistan.

== History ==
Hum Mart was founded in 2018 as a subsidiary of the Hum Network based in Karachi, Pakistan.

== See also ==
- Airlift Technologies
