= Andriy Zdesenko =

- Андрій Здесенко
- Born: 24 May 1969 (age 57); Dnipro, Ukrainian SSR
- Citizenship: Ukraine
- Education: Oles Honchar Dnipro National University
- Occupation: Businessman
- Known for: Founded Biosphere Corporation

Andriy Zdesenko (Ukrainian: Андрій Здесенко; 24 May 1969, Dnipro, Ukrainian SSR) — Ukrainian businessman, founder and president of Biosphere Corporation, owner of Charisma Fashion Group. Co-founder of the Inspira business club in Dnipro.

Listed in the top-100 richest people in Ukraine according to the Forbes magazine (since 2016).

== Biography ==
Andriy Zdesenko was born on 24 May 1969 in Dnipro. He graduated from the faculty of Physics and Mathematics of Oles Honchar Dnipro National University (DNU). He also received his second degree at the DNU's Faculty of Economics.

In 1997 Andriy Zdesenko founded Biosphere Corporation.

In 2008 he started to develop his own premium boutiques of European clothing brands Charisma Fashion Group. Now it is represented by 9 stores in Kyiv and Dnipro.

In 2014 Andriy Zdesenko along with Vladislav Guristrimba opened two restaurants of the Vapiano franchise in Kyiv and Lviv.

In 2017 Andriy Zdesenko was named among 10 businessmen who form the image and reputation of Ukraine in the world by the Business magazine. He was also included into the list of the 50 most stylish men in Ukraine by the ELLE MAN magazine.

The same year he invested $100,000 along with Vladislav Guristrimba in the Biosphere StartUP Platform to develop tech startups in Ukraine and abroad.

In 2019 the Focus magazine estimated the businessman's fortune at $110 million.

In 2020 the Forbes magazine estimated Zdesenko's fortune at more than $100 million.
