= Your.MD =

British digital healthtech company

Healthily / Your.MD
- Company type: Health technology
- Industry: Healthcare
- Genre: Artificial intelligence
- Founded: 2013 in Oslo, Norway
- Headquarters: London, United Kingdom
- Website: www.livehealthily.com

Your.MD also known as Healthily, is a digital healthtech company that uses artificial intelligence to provide users with personalised health information via a chatbot.

It was founded in Oslo, Norway in 2013 by Henrik Pettersen and now has headquarters in London, England. In June 2017, Your.MD raised $10 million in funding from its series A round, bringing total funding to $19 million. Its current investors include: Smedvig Capital AS, Orkla Group and a number of angel investors.

In August 2019, Reckitt Benckiser announced that they were making a strategic investment in and partnership with the company, and in October 2020 it was reported that they had invested €25 million to roll out its “health hubs” concept.

The company reported a 350% increase in the number of users, from 6m users from January to August 2019 to 26 m the same period in 2020, largely attributed to the Your.MD Covid-19 Symptom Mapper. The self-care app was launched in India in September 2020.

== Performance ==
In April 2017, Your.MD was awarded the Unesco/Netexplo Award 2017 for “innovations that can improve society”. The app received the ePrivacy seal, meaning that it fully complies with the European laws on privacy.

It entered into a partnership with BMJ Best Practice in May 2018 to validate the medical data used by its AI algorithms.

In October 2017, Your.MD contributed to the UK Government report “Growing the Artificial Intelligence industry in the UK”, and was featured for its presence in the personal health sector.

It has been compared to Babylon's GP at Hand app and Ada Health. In October 2017, when the three apps were tested with symptoms from asthma, shingles, alcohol-related liver disease, and urinary tract infection it failed to diagnose shingles or UTI. At that stage, the symptom checker was in a beta stage, and has since been upgraded.

In June 2020, it was awarded the CogX People's Choice COVID-19 Innovation for Society. It is one of the apps which is used to collect data to help model the evolving threat of COVID-19 across the UK in the OASIS project, working with researchers from Imperial College London.

== See also ==
- Ada Health
- Babylon Health
- WebMD
