= Maker's Row =

United States online marketplace

- Website type: Online marketplace
- Available in: English
- Owners: Matthew Burnett, Tanya Menendez, Scott Weiner
- Website: makersrow.com
- Launched: November 1, 2012
- Current status: Active

Maker's Row is an online marketplace and database for members to connect American manufacturers with small, medium-sized, and product-based businesses. Founded in November 2012, it is headquartered in Brooklyn, New York.

== History ==
Maker's Row was co-founded by Matthew Burnett, Tanya Menendez and Scott Weiner. Burnett, an industrial designer, previously owned and operated a watch line and a fashion line of leather goods. In early 2011, Burnett partnered with Tanya Menendez, then a Goldman Sachs analyst, to manage sales and operations at the fashion line. While working on the fashion line, Menendez came up with the idea to create a resource that would bring factories in the United States online in one place to make American factories more accessible. In May 2012, the Burnett and Menendez applied to The Brooklyn Beta Summer Camp where they would meet Scott Weiner, who was chosen to be the founding technical lead for the group.

Launched in November 2012, the site hosted over 1,400 manufacturers when Maker's Row announced $1 million in seed funding July 19, 2013.

In 2024, the company is among the top 10 suppliers to Ecommerce businesses.

=== City series ===
In summer 2013, Maker's Row launched Maker’s Row City Series to highlight how manufacturing contributes to the local community, economy, and city. The first and only city in the series is Newark, NJ. In collaboration with the Office of Mayor Cory Booker, Brick City Development Corporation, and Newark Regional Business Partnership, Maker's Row created a video celebrating Newark manufacturers.

== Services ==
=== Maker's Row Pros ===
Maker's Row Pros is a service that offers personal guidance in manufacturing and other areas. The members that have joined the “Maker Community” are able to communicate one-on-one with professionals through the service.
