= Coterie (company) =

American modern baby care brand

- Company type: Private
- Industry: Baby care
- Founded: 2018
- Founder: Frank Yu
- Headquarters: New York City, United States
- Area served: Worldwide
- Website: www.coterie.com

Coterie is an American modern baby care brand based in New York City.

== History ==
Coterie was founded in 2018 by Frank Yu. Since inception, the brand has raised a total of $26.65 million in funding, including a $2.75 million seed round in 2020 led by Willow Growth Partners, with participation from RiverPark Ventures, M3 Ventures, and TA Ventures.

As of 2020, Coterie sold more than 1 million diapers per month, indicating substantial market penetration. The brand has garnered endorsements by celebrities including Ashley Graham and Karlie Kloss.

== Business model ==
Coterie specializes in producing absorbent and sustainable diapers, soft baby pants, plant-based wipes and other baby care products.

== Award ==
- 2023 – Named The Best Overall Diaper of 2023 by The Bump in their Best of The Bump Awards for the second consecutive year.
