= Dial A Vet =

Australian veterinary telehealth company

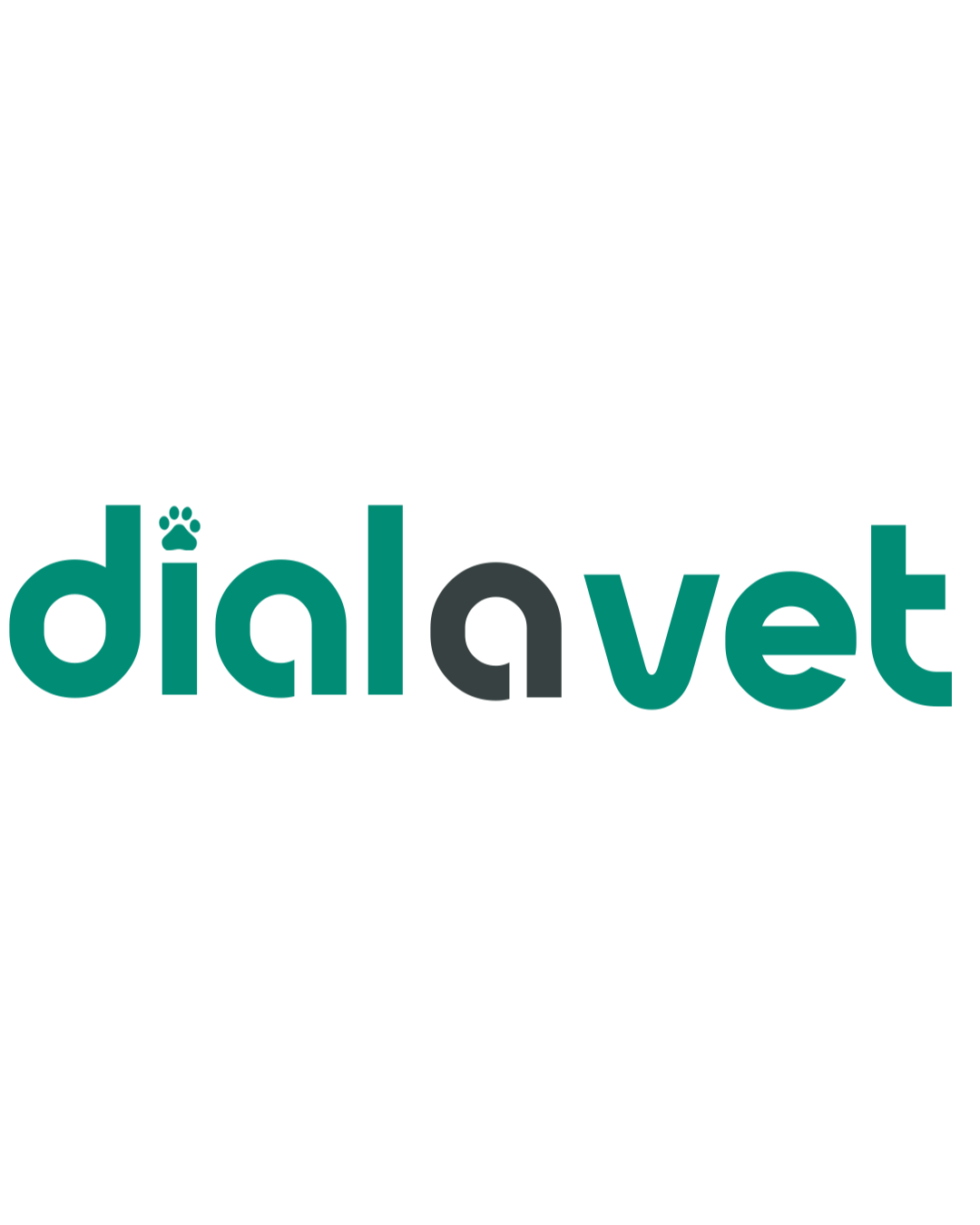
- Type: Private
- Industry: Veterinary medicine
- Founded: 2022
- Founder: Joshua Fidrmuc
- Headquarters: Surry Hills, New South Wales, Australia
- Key people: Joshua Fidrmuc (Founder & CEO)
- Website: www.dialavet.com

Dial A Vet is a veterinary telehealth service based in New South Wales, Australia. Founded in 2022 by Joshua Fidrmuc, the company provides remote veterinary consultations through video and phone calls. Its services are available in Australia, New Zealand, Canada, the United States, and the United Kingdom.

== History ==
Dial A Vet was established in 2022 during the COVID-19 pandemic as a response to reduced access to in-person veterinary care. The company began offering video consultations to facilitate remote assessments of pets by licensed professionals.

In 2023, the platform expanded its operations internationally, launching services in Canada, the United States, and the United Kingdom.

In 2024, Dial A Vet acquired the domain SpeakToAVet.com and reported estimated revenue of AUD 1 million. That year, the company also partnered with Australian pet care providers, including Mad Paws and Lyka. The Business Wire noted that Australian companies were increasingly offering the service as an employee benefit, citing its use in supporting workplace productivity and employee well-being. Programming Insider reported that the platform served pet owners globally and received over 100,000 monthly visitors to its veterinarian-reviewed advice blog.

Later in 2024, the company announced it was serving 7 million households across Australia.

== Services ==
Dial A Vet provides virtual consultations for pet health issues, including gastrointestinal symptoms, skin conditions, minor injuries, behavioural concerns, and preventive care. Consultations are conducted by Australian-licensed veterinarians and typically last 15 minutes. Users can access the service through the company's website, mobile application, and a browser-based platform.

In addition to consultations, Dial A Vet maintains a blog with veterinarian-reviewed articles and provides a free service known as "Ask A Vet," where users can submit pet health questions. As of 2024, the company reported collaborations with more than 250 veterinary professionals and over 40,000 inquiries submitted through the service.

== Reception ==
Dial A Vet has been listed among top veterinary apps in Australia and ranked fourth in the medical category on the Australian Apple App Store.

== See also ==
- Telemedicine
- Veterinary medicine
- Pet health
