= Ada Health =

Health company based in Berlin

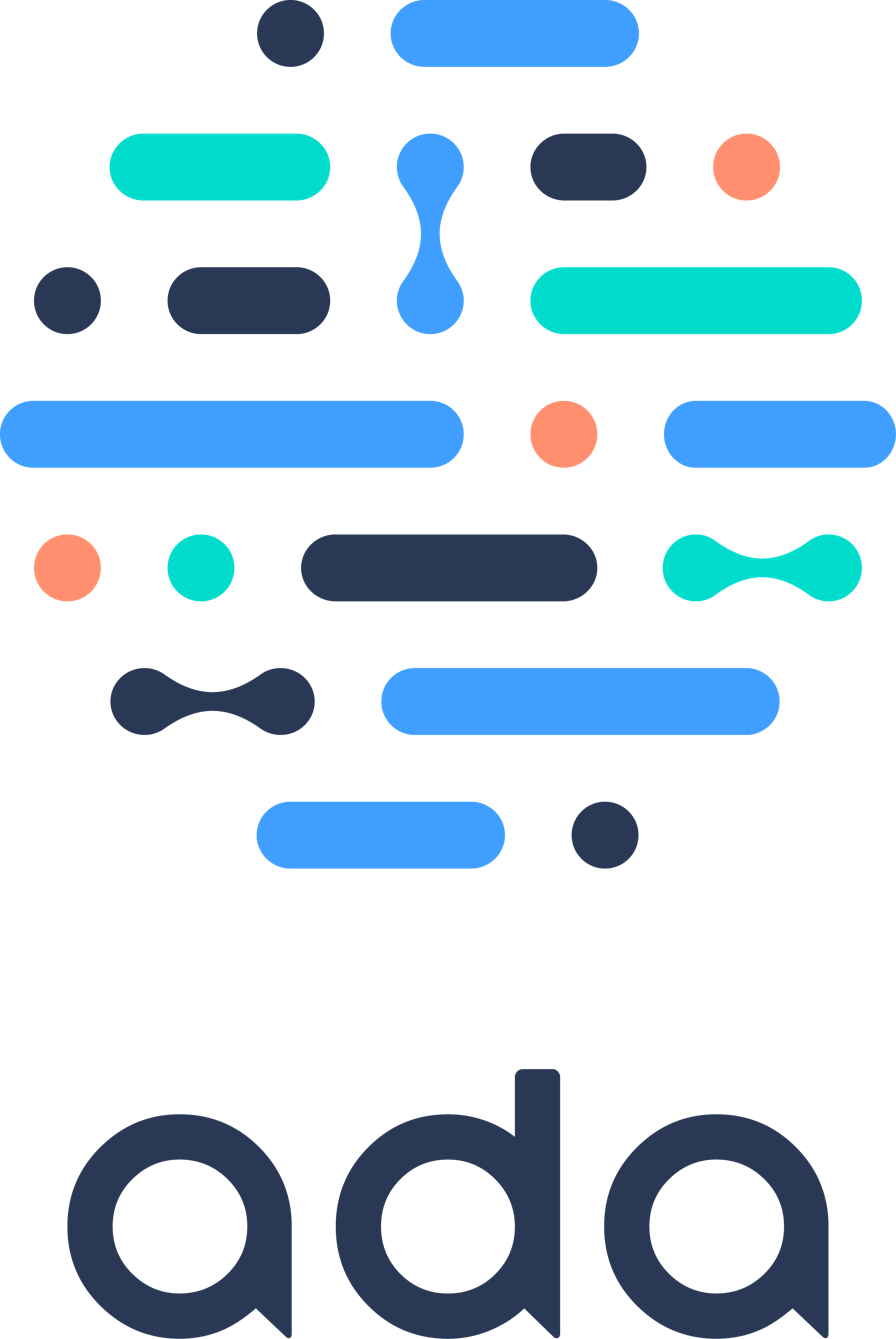
- Type: Private
- Industry: Health information technology
- Founded: 2011; 15 years ago
- Founders: Claire Novorol; Daniel Nathrath; Martin Hirsch
- Headquarters: Berlin, Germany
- Products: mHealth, Clinical decision support system, Artificial intelligence in healthcare
- Services: Enterprise software, Telemedicine, medical research
- Number of employees: 300 (2023)
- Website: ada.com

Ada Health was founded in 2011, by Dr. Claire Novorol, Professor Martin Hirsch, and Daniel Nathrath.

Ada Health is a provider of artificial intelligence (AI) and machine learning tools. The company has headquarters in Berlin, with offices in Boca Raton, London, and Toronto.

== History ==
Ada was established in 2011 by Dr. Claire Novorol (a clinician), Professor Martin Hirsch, and Daniel Nathrath. Dr. Novorol, a provider in the UK's National Health Service, developed the idea for the company while working in clinical genetics after successfully diagnosing a baby with a rare genetic condition through her searches of the medical literature and scientific databases at Addenbrooke's Hospital, Cambridge. After recognizing the potential for digital tools to aid in faster and more accurate decision-making for doctors, she founded a digital health network for medical professionals called "Doctorpreneurs", through which she met her co-founders in Berlin. Ada's first product, "Ada DX" was originally a clinical decision support technology aimed at assisting doctors in accurately diagnosing rare diseases. The system used a Bayesian probabilistic reasoning system based on the medical history and differential diagnosis approaches used in clinical medicine. A doctor would input the patient's signs, symptoms, and findings, and the system would provide a ranked list of probabilistic conditions. A visual display would also indicate how each data point entered had contributed to the relative statistical weighting of the probable conditions suggested.

=== Medical Focus ===
In 2016, the business pivoted from supporting doctors directly to supporting patients experiencing a new health problem with a browser-based online tool and smartphone app, commonly referred to as a "symptom checker" called Assess. Users enter their demographics, medical history, and interact with a chatbot that asks them about the symptoms, duration of illness, and severity of the problems they are experiencing. The probabilistic reasoning software supporting the software dynamically adjusts the questions asked to the user based on their previous answer, while also trying to ask as few questions as possible to prevent fatigue. This reasoning software is supported by a medical knowledge base built and reviewed by doctors that references the scientific medical literature, textbooks, regional epidemiology, disease models, and case reports including a range of several thousand common and rare diseases. At the end of their assessment the user is presented with a "triage" recommendation that suggests the level of urgency required and directs users to care options ranging from self-care at home to immediately seeking emergency care. In addition the app lists a number of "possible causes" that suggest medical conditions that might be causing the problem. Ada's software is available in English (US and UK), German, Spanish, Portuguese, Swahili, Romanian, and French.

=== Regulatory Classification ===
Ada's product available to healthcare enterprise clients, and the Ada consumer app (i.e. downloadable from app stores) are both CE-certified Class IIa medical devices under the European Union's Medical Device Regulation (Regulation (EU) 2017/745, EU-MRR). The company operates a quality management system certified under ISO 13485, and in the UK has passed UKCA marking assessment.

=== Media coverage ===
Ada has been compared to WebMD, Babylon's GP at Hand app, and Your.MD. In October 2017, when three apps were tested with symptoms from asthma, shingles, alcohol-related liver disease, and urinary tract infection, Ada performed very well; it asked about the most important symptoms and provided the best diagnoses. It produced diagrams showing which of the symptoms for each disease were present, the strength of the link, and a diagram of the percentage of people likely to have that diagnosis.

In September 2020, Broadband Commission for Sustainable Development issued a report identifying Ada as one of the AI solutions that have the "potential to address existing health inequalities and provide medical expertise to clinicians, health workers, and patients alike – all with the aim of improving the quality, access, and cost of healthcare delivery."

=== Rare diseases ===
A 2019, retrospective study evaluated Ada DX in rare disease diagnosis. Ada's top suggestion matched the confirmed diagnosis in 89% of cases (83 of 93 cases). In more than 56% of cases, Ada provided correct disease suggestions earlier than the time of clinical diagnosis. More than 33% of patients could have been identified as having a rare disease in the first documented clinical visit.
