= Remote therapy =

Remote therapy, sometimes called telemental health applications or Internet-based psychotherapy, is a form of psychotherapy or related psychological practice in which a trained psychotherapist meets with a client or patient via telephone, cellular phone, the internet or other electronic media in place of or in addition to conventional face-to-face psychotherapy.

Initially, it was primarily intended a substitution for conventional, face-to-face therapy in which a client or patient is required to visit a psychotherapists office. Increasingly, however, academics are studying the use of electronic media in treatment to explore the possibility of providing novel and potentially more effective therapies.

After reviewing thirteen relevant studies, the authors of a meta-analytic review of psychotherapy mediated by remote communications technology concluded that:

Remote therapy has the potential to overcome some of the barriers to conventional psychological therapy services. Telephone-based interventions are a particularly popular research focus and as a means of therapeutic communication may confer specific advantages in terms of their widespread availability and ease of operation. However, the available evidence is limited in quantity and quality. More rigorous trials are required to confirm these preliminary estimates of effectiveness.

== Examples ==
Despite the absence of complete study, remote therapy has enjoyed growing popularity as a replacement for traditional therapy and innovative practice made possible by electronic medium. Examples include:

- The US Army has initiated a program in which soldiers in combat participate in video-based relationship counseling with their partners at home.
- AbleTo uses remote therapy to extend the reach of evidence-based practice and introduce innovative new practices, e.g., the team-based applications of cognitive behavioral therapy utilizing a licensed therapist and behavioral coach.
- Mayo Clinic, provides remote cognitive rehabilitation sessions to patients who have had an acquired brain injury. Using an Internet-based, secure instant messaging platform, an office-based therapist conducts the rehabilitation session with the patient, who remains in or near his or her home.
- The National Institute for Health and Care Research (NIHR) has published a review of research on how remote therapy and other digital health technology can help manage health conditions.

== See also ==
- Telemedicine
