= Huma (company) =

British healthcare technology company

- Type: Private
- Industry: healthcare, big data, small data, mobile, internet of things, pharma, wearables
- Founded: 2011
- Headquarters: London, UK
- Website: www.huma.com

Huma (previously known as Medopad) is a British healthcare technology company based in London, UK. It produces applications that integrate health data from existing hospital databases as well as patient wearables and other mobile devices and securely transmits it for use by doctors.

== History ==
The company was originally founded as Medopad in 2011.

In November 2013, Medopad became the first enterprise-class mobile health information system to receive CE approval.

In April 2015, Medopad launched a chemotherapy application for monitoring cancer patients, designed specifically for the Apple Watch.

In January 2018, Medopad joined UK Prime Minister Theresa May on her trade mission to China to meet general secretary of the Chinese Communist Party Xi Jinping. During the trip, it announced over £100m of commercial contracts with major Chinese and international organisations, including China Resources and Peking University.

In April 2020, it rebranded as Huma after acquiring BioBeats and Tarilian Laser Technologies, both British health-tech companies. Along with the rebrand, the company's focus shifted from remote monitoring of patients with rare and chronic diseases towards gathering biological data for use in preventative healthcare. Huma also announced that it had appointed Alan Milburn as its first chairperson.

=== Funding ===
In July 2024, Huma raised $80 million in a Series D financing round. The investment round included contributions from AstraZeneca Plc, Bayer AG, Hitachi Ventures, and Italy’s Hat Technology Fund. Some of Medopad's institutional investors are Healthbox and Sandbox Industries. Lord Howard Flight and Tony Brown, Non-Executive Director of the NHS have both invested individually, as did entrepreneur and investor Tom Chapman.

== Products ==
Huma allows hospitals to pool their patient data into a single platform so it can be served to doctors' mobile devices in real-time. Healthcare professionals can securely access lab results, images, clinical notes, and primary care data via iPads and other mobile devices.

Some of the clinical applications that Huma include editing patient records by voice recognition or typing, scheduling, lab results, image viewing including X-rays and CT scans, electronic support documents, taking and sending photos, video conferencing, primary records, transmitting real-time vital signs, collecting and managing demographic and contact details, Apple HealthKit integration, and arbitrage system to sort and prioritise patients, hospital admission, and access to more third party applications integrated into Medopad through the Clinical App Store.

Huma's pricing structure takes the form of an annual software as a service license fee in the UK. In June 2014, it was reported that Medopad would cost hospitals between £50 and £90 per month per user to license. Carl Reynolds, head of Open Health Care UK told New Scientist that an open system that worked on multiple devices would be preferential to Medopad, as it would avoid locking hospitals into a single system.
