= Side effects of cyproterone acetate =

The side effects of cyproterone acetate (CPA), a steroidal antiandrogen and progestin, including its frequent and rare side effects, have been studied and characterized. It is generally well-tolerated and has a mild side-effect profile, regardless of dosage, when it used as a progestin or antiandrogen in combination with an estrogen such as ethinylestradiol or estradiol valerate in women. Side effects of CPA include hypogonadism and associated symptoms such as demasculinization, sexual dysfunction, infertility, and osteoporosis; breast changes such as breast tenderness, enlargement, and gynecomastia; emotional changes such as fatigue and depression; and other side effects such as vitamin B12 deficiency, weak glucocorticoid effects, and elevated liver enzymes. Weight gain can occur with CPA when it is used at high doses. Some of the side effects of CPA can be improved or fully prevented if it is combined with an estrogen to prevent estrogen deficiency. Few quantitative data are available on many of the potential side effects of CPA. Pooled tolerability data for CPA is not available in the literature.

At very high doses in aged people with prostate cancer, CPA can cause cardiovascular side effects. Rarely, CPA can produce blood clots, liver damage, excessively high prolactin levels, prolactinomas, and meningiomas. Upon discontinuation from high doses, CPA can produce adrenal insufficiency as a withdrawal effect.

== Overview ==
Side effects of high-dose cyproterone acetate
| Frequency | System Organ Class | Side effect |
|---|---|---|
| Very common (≥10%) | General disorders and administration site conditions | Headache; Tiredness |
| Very common (≥10%) | Psychiatric disorders | Decreased libido (men); Erectile dysfunction (men); Reduced ejaculate volume (men) |
| Very common (≥10%) | Reproductive system and breast disorders | Reversible inhibition of spermatogenesis (men); Inhibition of ovulation and reversible infertility (women) |
| Very common (≥10%) | Hepatobiliary disorders | Elevated liver enzymes |
| Common (≥1% and <10%) | Metabolism and nutrition disorders | Weight gain or loss (can be associated with fluid retention) |
| Common (≥1% and <10%) | Psychiatric disorders | Depressed mood; Restlessness |
| Common (≥1% and <10%) | Reproductive system and breast disorders | Gynecomastia (men); Breast pain/tenderness; Irregular menstruation |
| Common (≥1% and <10%) | General disorders and administration site conditions | Fatigue; Hot flashes; Sweating |
| Common (≥1% and <10%) | Respiratory, thoracic, and mediastinal disorders | Shortness of breath |
| Common (≥1% and <10%) | Gastrointestinal disorders | Nausea; Gastrointestinal complaints |
| Uncommon (≥0.1% and <1%) | Psychiatric disorders | Decreased libido (women) |
| Uncommon (≥0.1% and <1%) | Skin and subcutaneous tissue disorders | Rash |
| Rare (≥0.01% and <0.1%) | Immune system disorders | Hypersensitivity reactions (rash, itching, shortness of breath) |
| Rare (≥0.01% and <0.1%) | Psychiatric disorders | Increased libido (women) |
| Very rare (<0.01%) | Neoplasms benign and malignant | Benign and malignant liver tumors |
| Very rare (<0.01%) | Musculoskeletal and connective tissue disorders | Osteoporosis |
| Very rare (<0.01%) | Cardiovascular disorders | Thromboembolic events; Tachycardia |
| Very rare (<0.01%) | Reproductive system and breast disorders | Galactorrhea |
| Very rare (<0.01%) | General disorders and administration site conditions | Sleep disturbances |
| Unspecified | Unsorted | Anemia; Meningioma; Hyperprolactinemia; Prolactinoma; Intra-abdominal hemorrhage; Breast tension; Menstrual spotting; Low Dysmenorrhea Vaginal discharge Skin discoloration Stretch marks Rare Liver toxicity (including jaundice, hepatitis, liver failure) |
Notes: Side effects are for dosages of cyproterone acetate (Androcur) of 10 to 300 mg/day. Sources: See template.

Side effects of cyproterone acetate in the SExual-HOrmonal Surveillance STudy (SEHOST)
| Side effect | Males (136 mg/day) (Note: Average dosage; range less than 10 mg/day to >200 mg/day.) (n = 1248) (%) | Females (18 mg/day) (n = 1258) (%) | Total (77 mg/day) (n = 2506) (%) |
|---|---|---|---|
| Elevated liver enzymes (Note: Liver enzymes monitored in 1,685 individuals, including 1,131 males and 554 females.) | 12.5 | 3.6 | 9.6 |
| Gynecomastia, breast pain | 4.9 | 1.0 | 2.9 |
| Overweightness, weight gain | 0.9 | 4.1 | 2.5 |
| Headache, migraine | – | 3.4 | 1.7 |
| Depression, anxiety, nightmares, mood swings | 1.0 | 1.8 | 1.4 |
| Gastrointestinal dysfunction | 0.2 | 2.3 | 1.2 |
| Thyroid dysfunction | 0.2 | 1.8 | 1.0 |
| Skin changes (pigmentation, chloasma, others) | 0.3 | 1.4 | 0.8 |
| Edema | – | 1.1 | 0.6 |
| Adrenal insufficiency or hyperplasia | 0.2 | 0.8 | 0.5 |
| Tiredness, lethargy, apathy | 0.6 | 0.6 | 0.6 |
| Alopecia, hair growth | 0.2 | 0.2 | 0.2 |
| Increased asthma attack rates | – | 0.3 | 0.2 |
| Osteoporosis | 0.2 | 0.08 | 0.2 |
| More frequently prone to attacks | 0.2 | 0.2 | 0.2 |
| Diabetes mellitus | 0.08 | 0.08 | 0.08 |
| Total (excluding elevated liver enzymes) | 9.0 | 19.1 | 14.0 |
Notes: Data from the SExual-HOrmonal Surveillance STudy (SEHOST), a long-term pharmacoepidemiologic active surveillance study. The sample included males and females age 3 to 75 years with precocious puberty, hyperandrogenism, sexual deviance, and/or transgenderism; prostate cancer was not included. Sources: See template.

Side effects of estradiol undecylate versus cyproterone acetate in men
| Side effect | Estradiol undecylate 100 mg/month i.m. (n = 96) | | Cyproterone acetate 100 mg/day oral (n = 95) | |
| Side effect | n | % | n | % |
|---|---|---|---|---|
| Gynecomastia* | 74 | 77.1% | 12 | 12.6% |
| Breast tenderness* | 84 | 87.5% | 6 | 6.3% |
| Sexual impotence | "Occurred in essentially all patients of both groups" | | | |
| Leg edema* | 17 | 17.7% | 4 | 4.2% |
| Thrombosis | 4 | 4.2% | 5 | 5.3% |
| Cardiovascular mortality | 2 | 2.1% | 2 | 2.1% |
| Other mortality | 1^{a} | 1.0% | 0 | 0% |
Notes: For 6 months in 191 men age 51 to 88 years with prostate cancer. Footnotes: * = Differences in incidences between groups were statistically significant. ^{a} = Due to unknown causes. Sources: See template.

== Low hormone levels ==
Side effects in men resulting from the antiandrogenic and antigonadotropic properties of CPA include physical demasculinization, sexual dysfunction (including loss of libido and erectile dysfunction), absence of ejaculate, impaired spermatogenesis, testicular atrophy, and reversible infertility. CPA has been described as causing "severe" suppression of sex drive and erectile potency in men with prostate cancer, comparable to that seen with surgical castration. Due to suppression of the production of estrogens, long-term use of high-dose CPA without concomitant estrogen therapy can result in the development of osteoporosis in both sexes. CPA can also sometimes cause breast changes in men such as gynecomastia (breast growth), breast tenderness, and galactorrhea (milk outflow). The use of CPA in men has been associated with cellulite, which has been attributed to androgen deficiency as well.

=== Breast changes ===
CPA can sometimes cause breast changes in men including gynecomastia (breast development) and breast tenderness. Rates of gynecomastia of 4 to 30% have been reported. Galactorrhea (milk outflow) can also occur in males, due to the strong progestogenic effects of CPA.

=== Depression ===
CPA has occasionally been associated with depressive mood changes in both men and women. Similar depressive changes have been observed with castration, and may be a consequence of androgen deprivation in men. In large studies, the incidence of depression has been 1 to 10% in both women taking high-dose CPA in combination with an estrogen for androgen-dependent skin and hair conditions and men taking high-dose CPA alone or in conjunction with castration for prostate cancer. In some small studies however, relatively high rates of depression of 20 to 30% have been reported with both low- and high-dose CPA in combination with an estrogen in women. In one large randomized controlled trial that performed a direct head-to-head comparison of high-dose (100 mg/day) versus low-dose CPA (2 mg/day), both in combination with an estrogen, the overall rate of depression was 12.7% and the rates did not differ between the two groups. Despite some association with depression, the incidence of depression in women taking CPA in combination with an estrogen has been described by some researchers as "remarkably low", which they have said may be related to the positive psychological effects of the improvement in androgenic symptoms.

A randomized controlled trial comparing the cognitive and emotional effects of GnRH agonists and CPA in 82 men with prostate cancer found no significant differences in scores on the Depression Anxiety Stress Scale-21 (DASS-21) after 6 months of treatment. However, a 12-month follow-up of 62 of the men found a significant increase in emotional distress as measured by the DASS-21 in the CPA and watchful waiting groups relative to the GnRH-agonist groups. Nonetheless, the mean levels of emotional distress remained within the normal range.

A retrospective study reported that the rate of depression was greater with CPA (8.3%) than with GnRH analogues (2.2%) when both were used in combination with an estrogen in transgender women, although this study did not control for mood-related confounds. Another retrospective study in transgender women, which used the Beck Depression Inventory‐II and other scales, found no significant differences in psychological well‐being or satisfaction with the combination of an estrogen and CPA or a GnRH agonist. Hormone therapy in transgender women, including studies that used CPA, has been found to result in a significant decrease in depressive symptoms.

In a series of relatively small studies of the combination of low-dose CPA and ethinylestradiol as a birth control pill, depression was reported to have occurred in 1.3 to 4% of cycles. This is similar to the rate of mood changes (<3.5%) observed with birth control pills containing other progestins. A pharmacoepidemiological study using data from the United Kingdom General Practice Research Database found that the incidence of depression with birth control pills containing CPA was identical to that of birth control pills containing other progestins (IRR = 0.99). In clinical studies of the combination of low-dose CPA and estradiol valerate for the treatment of menopausal symptoms, preexisting adverse mood symptoms have been found to be significantly improved.

Because of the possible side effect of worsened depressive symptoms, it may be advisable to use CPA with caution in individuals with a history of depression, particularly if severe.

=== Bone loss ===
Androgen deprivation therapy, with medications such as CPA or GnRH modulators or with orchiectomy, results in profound deficiency of both androgens and estrogens in men. These hormones, particularly estrogens, are known to be importantly involved in maintaining bone mineral density, both in men and women. As a result, androgen deprivation therapy causes a rapid decrease in bone mineral density in men and can result in osteopenia or osteoporosis with long-term therapy.

The bone loss that happens with androgen deprivation therapy typically occurs in the spine, hip, and forearm, but can also occur in other areas of the appendicular skeleton such as the femoral neck. It can be seen within one year of treatment, and continues thereafter. Lumbar spine bone density has been found to decrease at a rate of 3 to 7% per year with androgen deprivation therapy in men. Androgen deprivation therapy also decreases muscle mass, and this may increase the risk of falls that can result in bone fractures as well as directly decrease bone mass. The risk of bone fractures in men with prostate cancer given androgen deprivation therapy has been estimated to be increased by 45%. The incidence of osteoporosis increases in men with prostate cancer from 36% to 80% after 10 years of androgen deprivation therapy, and following that, it can be expected that all treated men will develop osteopenia or osteoporosis. The bone loss that occurs with androgen deprivation therapy in men is similar to that which occurs in postmenopausal women.

Although androgen deprivation therapy is known to cause osteoporosis, it is thought that CPA may have a lower risk of osteoporosis than GnRH modulators or orchiectomy. This is believed to be due to the progestogenic activity of CPA, which may help to inhibit bone resorption caused by sex-hormone deficiency. However, the notion that progestogenic activity has beneficial effects on bone health is controversial. Regardless of whether the notion is correct or not, case reports and case series of osteoporosis with CPA therapy in men have been published. Changes in biomarkers suggestive of bone loss have also been reported for high-dose CPA monotherapy. In addition, the use of progestogen-only birth control in women, with progestins similar to CPA like medroxyprogesterone acetate, has been found to result in decreased bone mineral density in premenopausal women.

Calcium and vitamin D supplementation may help to reduce the risk of osteoporosis with androgen deprivation therapy in men. Bisphosphonates can be used to reduce bone loss and fractures due to androgen deprivation therapy. Estrogen replacement and selective estrogen receptor modulators may also be employed, although estrogens can produce gynecomastia in men and may increase the risk of male breast cancer. Selective estrogen receptor modulators have been found to decrease the rate of bone loss due to androgen deprivation therapy in men by 50% after 2 years of therapy. However, selective estrogen receptor modulators are described as substantially less effective for this indication than estrogens, which are the most effective medications for this purpose available.

== High progestogenic exposure ==
=== High prolactin levels ===
CPA increases prolactin levels and can produce hyperprolactinemia (high prolactin levels) due to its progestogenic activity and consequent stimulation of pituitary lactotrophs. Increases in prolactin levels can occur at low, medium, and high doses of CPA, with or without an estrogen. Elevation of prolactin levels may be greater and hyperprolactinemia more likely to occur when CPA is combined with an estrogen, as combinations of estrogens and progestogens show synergistic increases in prolactin levels in non-human primates. Although hyperprolactinemia can develop with CPA, prolactin levels only rarely exceed the normal physiological range, and increased prolactin levels with CPA are said to be seldom of clinical significance.

At a dosage of 10 mg/day in men, CPA has been found to increase prolactin levels by 75%. In another study, a combination of 2 or 20 mg/day CPA with testosterone undecanoate resulted in modest increases in prolactin levels (+96%) in men similarly. The increase in prolactin levels in men with 100 mg/day oral CPA (+118%) has been found to be less than that with 100 mg/month intramuscular estradiol undecylate (+192%). The combination of high-dose (100 μg/day) ethinylestradiol and high-dose (100 mg/day) oral CPA in transgender women has been reported to increase the risk of hyperprolactinemia by 425-fold (20% incidence) relative to cisgender men. However, other studies using the same regimen have found lower incidences of hyperprolactinemia (e.g., 4–7% per year). In one study, prolactin levels were 18 ng/mL at the start of treatment, 23 ng/mL after 3 months of 100 mg/day CPA, and 19 to 28 ng/mL after 6 to 15 months of 100 μg/day ethinylestradiol and 100 mg/day oral CPA in transgender women.

The major symptom of hyperprolactinemia as a condition is hypogonadism, which is caused by the antigonadotropic effects of prolactin. Symptoms consequent to hypogonadism include amenorrhea, menopausal symptoms like hot flashes and vaginal dryness, sexual dysfunction, infertility, reduced muscle mass, and decreased bone mineral density. However, due to its progestogenic actions and the potent antigonadotropic effects produced by this activity, CPA can produce such symptoms as side effects regardless of the presence or absence of hyperprolactinemia.

Prolactin additionally appears to have a direct inhibitory effect on sexual desire in men that is independent of hypogonadism. In men with hyperprolactinemia and hypogonadism, sexual desire is not restored by testosterone replacement therapy, but is restored by prolactin-suppressing medications. Conversely, erectile dysfunction in men with hyperprolactinemia is considered to be due to hypogonadism rather than due to direct actions of prolactin itself. On the other hand, it is thought that prolactin may be responsible for the normal sexual refractory period in men, and may directly inhibit the capacity for orgasm.

In addition to symptoms of hypogonadism and sexual dysfunction, hyperprolactinemia can cause breast changes such as breast pain, breast enlargement, gynecomastia, and galactorrhea. Galactorrhea secondary to hyperprolactinemia is very common in premenopausal women (80%) but more uncommon in individuals with low estrogen levels such as postmenopausal women and men. Gynecomastia likewise occurs at a relatively low rate in men with hyperprolactinemia (23%). Studies in transgender women have found low but significant incidences of galactorrhea with the combination of estrogen and CPA.

Prolactin increases levels of adrenal androgens like dehydroepiandrosterone and dehydroepiandrosterone sulfate by increasing their production and secretion from the adrenal glands. For this reason, hyperprolactinemia can cause symptoms of hyperandrogenism such as acne and hirsutism in women. However, such symptoms are not described with CPA, which instead treats these conditions; this can be attributed to the antiandrogenic and glucocorticoid activity of CPA. Through such activities, CPA directly blocks the actions of androgens and can suppress dehydroepiandrosterone sulfate secretion from the adrenal glands.

=== Brain tumors ===
The combination of an estrogen and CPA has been associated, albeit rarely, with the incidence and/or aggravation of a few different types of usually benign (non-cancerous) brain tumors, most notably prolactinomas and meningiomas. Prolactinomas are benign tumors of the pituitary gland that secrete prolactin, and are one of several types of secreting pituitary adenomas. They can produce hyperprolactinemia (abnormally high prolactin levels) as a symptom, which often leads to their diagnosis. Meningiomas are usually-benign tumors of the meninges, the membranes that envelop the brain and spinal cord. Due to its association with meningiomas, CPA is considered to be contraindicated in people with meningioma or a history of meningioma. Benign brain tumors associated with an estrogen and/or CPA can cause visual disturbances or in severe cases complete blindness due to compression of the optic nerve and/or chiasm.

Meningiomas are 2 to 3 times as prevalent in women than in men, and acceleration of meningioma growth has been observed during pregnancy and in the luteal phase of the menstrual cycle, indicating a possible hormonal link. There is expression of the PR in the anterior pituitary and high expression of the PR in the meninges, suggesting that activation of the PR by CPA is involved in the pathogenesis of the benign brain tumors associated with it. Estrogen receptors are also expressed in the anterior pituitary, and are known to increase the expression of the PR in this area. In accordance, estrogens and progestogens, including CPA, are known to increase prolactin levels, particularly at high concentrations (e.g., pregnancy). While most cases of benign brain tumors associated with CPA have been in combination with an estrogen and have occurred in transgender women, there have been cases associated with high-dose CPA alone in both cisgender women and men as well. Benign brain tumors such as meningiomas have also been associated with high doses of other progestogens, such as chlormadinone acetate, megestrol acetate, medroxyprogesterone acetate, and nomegestrol acetate, as well as with pregnancy.

A number of case reports of prolactinomas (as well as a non-secreting pituitary adenoma), meningiomas, and vestibular schwannomas associated with estrogen and CPA therapy in transgender women have been published. A large retrospective chart study of 2,555 transgender women treated most frequently with an estrogen and CPA and followed for 23,935 person-years reported occurrences of 8 meningiomas (0.31% or 1 in 320 incidence; SIR = 4.1 relative to cisgender females, SIR = 11.9 relative to cisgender males), 9 prolactinomas (0.35% or 1 in 284 incidence; SIR = 4.3 relative to cisgender females, SIR = 26.5 relative to cisgender males), one non-secreting pituitary adenoma, and two vestibular schwannomas. A retrospective study of 303 transgender women treated with high-dose estrogen and CPA and followed for a median 4.4 years (range 6 months to 6 months to 14 years) reported occurrences of 46 cases of hyperprolactinemia (serum prolactin >1,000 mU/L) (15% incidence; 400-fold increased risk relative to cisgender males). Of 23 persistent cases, 15 of which returned for follow up, 5 of the cases showed an enlarged pituitary gland on CT scanning with contrast enhancement. Dosages of CPA in combination with an estrogen that have been associated with benign brain tumors have been 10 mg/day and above. In contrast to the combination of an estrogen and CPA, estrogen alone has been associated only with single case reports of prolactinomas in transgender women.

A nationwide population study in Denmark found no significant association of CPA or other antiandrogens with meningioma in men. However, studies in Spain and the United Kingdom have found positive associations of CPA therapy with meningioma.

A hemangioblastoma mimicking a meningioma has been reported in a man treated with CPA.

Published case reports of cyproterone acetate-associated prolactinoma
| # | Age | Sex | Medications | Treatment duration | Ref | Link |
|---|---|---|---|---|---|---|
| 1 | 26 years | MtF | CPA 100 mg/day, EE 100 μg/day, EU 100 mg/2x week | ~10 months | Gooren et al. (1988) | |
| 2 | 32 years | MtF | CPA 150 mg/day, EE 1.5 mg/day | 4 years | Serri et al. (1996) | |
| 3 | 52 years | MtF | CPA 100 mg/day, EE 100 μg/day | 15 years | Bunck et al. (2009) | |
| 4 | 33 years | MtF | CPA 200 mg/day, CEEs 2.5 mg/day | 6 months | García-Malpartida et al. (2010) | |
| 5 | 41 years | MtF | CPA 2 mg/day, EE 35 μg/day, E2-EN 10 mg/2 weeks i.m. | 18 years | Cunha et al. (2015) | |
| 6 | 32 years | MtF | CPA 100 mg/day, E2 injections 100 mg/2 weeks i.m. | 53 months | Nota et al. (2018) | |
| 7 | 39 years | MtF | CPA 100 mg/day, CEEs 2.5 mg/day | 172 months | Nota et al. (2018) | |
| 8 | 27 years | MtF | CPA, E2 injections i.m. (no dosage information) | 156 months | Nota et al. (2018) | |
| 9 | 46 years | MtF | CPA 100 mg/day, EE 100 μg/day | 66 months | Nota et al. (2018) | |
| 10 | 24 years | MtF | CPA 100 mg/day (no estrogen mentioned) | 9 months | Nota et al. (2018) | |
| 11 | 47 years | MtF | CPA 100 mg/day, EE 100 μg/day | 91 months | Nota et al. (2018) | |
| 12 | 28 years | MtF | CPA 50 mg/day, EV 2 mg/day oral | 134 months | Nota et al. (2018) | |
| 13^{a} | 34 years | MtF | CPA 50 mg/day, EV 1 mg/day oral | 35 months | Nota et al. (2018) | |
Abbreviations: CPA = Cyproterone acetate. E2 = Estradiol. EV = Estradiol valerate. E2-EN = Estradiol enanthate. EU = Estradiol undecylate. CEEs = Conjugated estrogens. EE = Ethinylestradiol. MtF = Male-to-female (transgender woman). i.m. = Intramuscular injection. Footnotes: ^{a} = Non-secretive pituitary adenoma. Notes: Asscheman et al. (1988) also described 5 MtF cases of pituitary enlargement and possible prolactinoma. van Kesteren et al. (1997) described possible MtF cases of pituitary enlargement as well. Five estrogen-only MtF cases (without CPA) have also been reported. Futterweit (1998) described an MtF case without information about medications. Sources:

Published case reports of cyproterone acetate-associated meningioma
| # | Age | Sex | Medications | Treatment duration | Ref | Link |
|---|---|---|---|---|---|---|
| 1 | 28 years | MtF | CPA 100 mg/day, EE 100 μg/day | 5 years | Gazzeri et al. (2007) | |
| 2 | 48 years | MtF | CPA 100 mg/day, EE ("feminizing regimen") | 10 years | Cebula et al. (2010) | |
| 3 | 46 years | Female | CPA 50 mg/day, E2 ("substitutive") | 10 years | Gonçalves et al. (2010) | |
| 4 | 83 years | Male | CPA ≥50 mg/day | 2 years | Gil et al. (2011) | |
| 5 | 71 years | Male | CPA ≥50 mg/day | 3 years | Gil et al. (2011) | |
| 6 | 66 years | Female | CPA ≥50 mg/day | 3 years | Gil et al. (2011) | |
| 7 | 43 years | Female | CPA ≥50 mg/day | 2 years | Gil et al. (2011) | |
| 8 | 35 years | MtF | CPA 100 mg/day, E2 100 μg/day patch | 4 years | Bergoglio et al. (2012) | |
| 9 | 60 years | MtF | CPA 50 mg/day, E2 8 mg/day oral | 10 years | Knight et al. (2013) | |
| 10 | 56 years | MtF | CPA, EV 2 mg/day oral | 8 years | Razavi (2014) | |
| 11 | 51 years | Female | CPA 15 mg/day | 30 years | Bernat et al. (2015) | |
| 12 | 47 years | Female | CPA 25 mg/day | 15 years | Bernat et al. (2015) | |
| 13 | 43 years | Female | CPA 50 mg/day | 12 years | Bernat et al. (2015) | |
| 14 | 39 years | Female | CPA 50 mg/day | 10 years | Bernat et al. (2015) | |
| 15 | 61 years | Female | CPA 25 mg/day | 24 years | Bernat et al. (2015) | |
| 16 | 38 years | Female | CPA 25 mg/day | 10 years | Bernat et al. (2015) | |
| 17 | 45 years | Female | CPA 50 mg/day | 20 years | Bernat et al. (2015) | |
| 18 | 53 years | Female | CPA 50 mg/day | 20 years | Bernat et al. (2015) | |
| 19 | 56 years | Female | CPA 50 mg/day | 8 years | Bernat et al. (2015) | |
| 20 | 55 years | Female | CPA 50 mg/day | 30 years | Bernat et al. (2015) | |
| 21 | 49 years | Female | CPA 50 mg/day | 20 years | Bernat et al. (2015) | |
| 22 | 49 years | Female | CPA 50 mg/day | 25 years | Bernat et al. (2015) | |
| 23 | 58 years | Female | CPA 50 mg/day | 18 years | Botella et al. (2015) | |
| 24 | 37 years | Female | CPA 50 mg/day | 11 years | Botella et al. (2015) | |
| 25 | 42 years | Male | CPA 100 mg/day | 23 years | Sys & Kestelyn (2015) | |
| 26 | 45 / 46 years | MtF | CPA 10 or 100 mg/day, E2 20 mg/4 months implant | 5 years | ter Wengel et al. (2015) | |
| 27 | 51 years | MtF | CPA 100 mg/day, EE 100 μg/day | 25 years | ter Wengel et al. (2015) | |
| 28 | 65 years | MtF | CPA 10 mg/day, CEEs 1.25 mg/day | 19 years | ter Wengel et al. (2015) | |
| 29 | 26 years | Female | CPA 50 mg/day | 10 years | Kalamarides & Peyre (2017) | |
| 30 | 43 years | Female | CPA 25 mg/day | 25 years | Kalamarides & Peyre (2017) | |
| 31 | 83 years | Male | CPA 200 mg/day | 7 months | Keilani & Abada (2017) | |
| 32 | 65 years | Female | CPA 50 mg/day | 15 years | Bernat et al. (2018) | |
| 33 | 77 years | MtF | CPA 50 mg/day, E2 50 μg/day patch | 24 years | Boer et al. (2018) | |
| 34 | 41 years | MtF | CPA 50 mg/day, E2 gel 1–3 mg/day | 9 years | Mancini et al. (2018) | |
| 35 | 60 years | MtF | CPA, CEEs | 36 years | Nizar & Seal (2018) | |
| 36 | 51 years | MtF | CPA 20 mg/week, E2 100 μg/day patch | 11 years | Nota et al. (2018) | |
| 37 | 66 years | MtF | CPA 10 mg/day | 40 years | Nota et al. (2018) | |
| 38 | 58 years | MtF | CPA 50 mg/day, E2 100 μg/day patch | 6 years | Nota et al. (2018) | |
| 39 | 49 years | MtF | CPA, EV 2 mg/day | 16 years | Nota et al. (2018) | |
| 40 | 51 years | MtF | CPA 100 mg/day, EE 100 μg/day patch | 26 years | Nota et al. (2018) | |
| 41 | 50 years | MtF | CPA 50 mg/day, E2 0.6 mg/g cream 2x/day | ~10 years | Raj et al. (2018) | |
| 42 | 48 years | MtF | CPA 50 mg/day, E2 1 mg/g cream 3x/day | 21 years | Raj et al. (2018) | |
| 43 | 43 years | Female | CPA 25–50 mg/day, EV 2 mg/day, finasteride 5 mg/day, others | 23 years | Chasseur et al. (2019) | |
| 44 | 67 years | MtF | CPA, estrogen | >14 years | Alalade et al. (2019) | |
| 45 | 46 years | Female | CPA 5 mg/day, subsequently NOMAC 5 mg/day | 15 years | Champagne et al. (2019) | |
| 46 | 58 years | Female | CPA 25–100 mg/day for 10 days/cycle | 34 years | Owens et al. (2019) | |
| 47 | ? | Male | CPA 300 mg/2 weeks i.m., leuprorelin 11.25 mg/3 months i.m. | ? | Colstrup et al. (2020) | |
Abbreviations: CPA = Cyproterone acetate. E2 = Estradiol. EV = Estradiol valerate. CEEs = Conjugated estrogens. EE = Ethinylestradiol. MtF = Male-to-female (transgender woman). Notes: For the Bernat et al. (2015) cases, only one was reported to be taking an estrogen (specifically estradiol). Froelich et al. (2008) reported an additional 8 female cases (age 33–62 years, mean 46 years; 50 mg/day CPA; 10–20 years exposure) with multiple meningiomas. Cea-Soriano et al. (2012) also reported 8 cases (4 male (≥50 mg/day, OR = 3.28), 4 female (2 mg/day, OR = 1.03)) with no individual specifics. Peyre et al. reported 38 operated cases. Portet et al. (2019) reported 30 operated cases. Cases in association with other progestins have been reported as well. Deipolyi, Han, & Parsa (2010) reported a case in an MtF in association with E2 100 μg/day only. Sources:

=== Blood clots ===
The combination of low-dose (2 mg) CPA in combination with ethinylestradiol (35 μg), as in combined birth control pills, presents an increased risk of venous thromboembolism (VTE). Women who take contraceptive pills containing CPA have a 6- to 7-fold increased risk of developing VTE compared to women not taking a contraceptive pill, and twice the risk of women who take a contraceptive pill containing the androgenic progestin levonorgestrel. The absolute risk of VTE with ethinylestradiol and low-dose CPA-containing birth control pills is about 1 to 10 per 10,000 woman-years. At least four publicized cases of fatal VTE have been attributed to birth control pills containing ethinylestradiol and low-dose CPA. The progestogenic, antiandrogenic, and glucocorticoid activities of CPA are all thought to be involved in the increased risk of VTE with CPA in combination with estrogens.

The combination of oral 100 μg/day ethinylestradiol and 100 mg/day CPA was reported to produce a 45-fold increase in the risk of VTE in 303 transgender women, with an absolute incidence of 6.3% (19 cases). The risk was highly age-dependent, with a rate of VTE of 2.1% in those less than 40 years of age and of 12% in those over 40 years of age. In a subsequent study of 816 transgender women in whom the same regimen was used but transdermal estradiol had become the standard therapy for those over the age of 40, the risk of VTE was still increased overall by 20-fold (45 cases, 5.5% incidence). However, there was only a single case of VTE in the group of 138 transgender women treated with transdermal estradiol (0.7% incidence). In accordance, the combination of transdermal estradiol and 50 mg/day cyproterone acetate appears to be relatively safe in terms of VTE risk. The VTE risk was initially attributed exclusively to ethinylestradiol, and the use of ethinylestradiol has largely been abandoned in transgender women in favor of other estrogens such as estradiol because of it. However, CPA is now known to significantly increase the risk of VTE as well, and it may have contributed also. CPA should be discontinued in transgender women after sex reassignment surgery or orchiectomy to reduce the risk of VTE. It should also be discontinued at least 2 weeks before undergoing surgery to reduce the risk of VTE.

A large pharmacoepidemiological study in the United Kingdom using the General Practice Research Database assessed the risk of VTE with various forms of androgen deprivation therapy for prostate cancer. The study had a sample of 11,199 men, of whom 229 (2.0%) experienced VTE and in whom 14% this was fatal. The incidence rates for VTE were 3.46 for CPA monotherapy relative to nonsteroidal antiandrogen monotherapy with flutamide or bicalutamide; 3.35 for CPA monotherapy relative to GnRH agonist/orchiectomy monotherapy; 1.25 for CPA monotherapy relative to estrogen monotherapy with diethylstilbestrol or estramustine phosphate; and 0.60 for CPA monotherapy relative to combined androgen blockade with a GnRH agonist/orchiectomy and CPA. The adjusted odds ratios for VTE were 1.00 for no treatment; 1.29 for nonsteroidal antiandrogen therapy; 3.35 for combined androgen blockade with CPA and a GnRH agonist/orchiectomy; 5.23 for CPA monotherapy; and 5.67 for estrogen monotherapy. The adjusted odds ratios for VTE of different dosages of CPA with or without a GnRH agonist relative to GnRH agonist monotherapy were 3.49 for 25 or 50 mg/day, 4.93 for 100 or 150 mg/day, and 4.54 for greater than or equal to 200 mg/day. In addition to CPA and other medications used to treat prostate cancer, metastatic prostate cancer is itself a risk factor for VTE.

In large randomized controlled trials of CPA versus other medications for the treatment of prostate cancer, the following incidences of VTE have been observed: 5.3% for 100 mg/day oral CPA (n = 95) vs. 4.2% for 100 mg/month intramuscular estradiol undecylate (n = 96); 2.4% for 250 mg/day oral CPA (n = 82) vs. 6.1% for 200 mg/day oral medroxyprogesterone acetate (n = 73) vs. 8.2% for 3 mg/day oral diethylstilbestrol (n = 114) (EORTC Trial 30761); and 4.5% for 300 mg/day oral CPA (n = 130) vs. 0% for 750 mg/day flutamide (n = 134). However, the final analysis of the last study (EORTC Trial 30892) indicated that VTE ultimately ended up occurring in 3 patients (2.0%) in the flutamide group (n = 151) and 7 patients (4.6%) in the CPA group (n = 152). For further comparison, in another similar and closely related trial (EORTC Trial 30762), the incidence of VTE was 6.3% with 3 mg/day oral diethylstilbestrol (n=112) and 7.9% with 280–560 mg/day oral estramustine phosphate (n = 114).

Premenopausal women using depot injectable medroxyprogesterone acetate, a progestin related to CPA, as a form of progestogen-only birth control, have been observed to have a 2.2- to 3.6-fold increased risk of VTE. However, this could have reflected preferential prescription of DMPA to women considered to be at an increased risk of VTE. DMPA has little or no effect on coagulation and fibrinolytic factors. In addition, progestogens by themselves at physiological doses normally do not increase the risk of thrombosis.

Risk of venous thromboembolism (VTE) with hormone therapy and birth control (QResearch/CPRD)
| Type | Route | Medications | Odds ratio (95% CI) |
|---|---|---|---|
| Menopausal hormone therapy | Oral | Estradiol alone ≤1 mg/day >1 mg/day | 1.27 (1.16–1.39)*; 1.22 (1.09–1.37)*; 1.35 (1.18–1.55)* |
| Menopausal hormone therapy | Oral | Conjugated estrogens alone ≤0.625 mg/day >0.625 mg/day | 1.49 (1.39–1.60)*; 1.40 (1.28–1.53)*; 1.71 (1.51–1.93)* |
| Menopausal hormone therapy | Oral | Estradiol/medroxyprogesterone acetate | 1.44 (1.09–1.89)* |
| Menopausal hormone therapy | Oral | Estradiol/dydrogesterone ≤1 mg/day E2 >1 mg/day E2 | 1.18 (0.98–1.42); 1.12 (0.90–1.40); 1.34 (0.94–1.90) |
| Menopausal hormone therapy | Oral | Estradiol/norethisterone ≤1 mg/day E2 >1 mg/day E2 | 1.68 (1.57–1.80)*; 1.38 (1.23–1.56)*; 1.84 (1.69–2.00)* |
| Menopausal hormone therapy | Oral | Estradiol/norgestrel or estradiol/drospirenone | 1.42 (1.00–2.03) |
| Menopausal hormone therapy | Oral | Conjugated estrogens/medroxyprogesterone acetate | 2.10 (1.92–2.31)* |
| Menopausal hormone therapy | Oral | Conjugated estrogens/norgestrel ≤0.625 mg/day CEEs >0.625 mg/day CEEs | 1.73 (1.57–1.91)*; 1.53 (1.36–1.72)*; 2.38 (1.99–2.85)* |
| Menopausal hormone therapy | Oral | Tibolone alone | 1.02 (0.90–1.15) |
| Menopausal hormone therapy | Oral | Raloxifene alone | 1.49 (1.24–1.79)* |
| Menopausal hormone therapy | Transdermal | Estradiol alone ≤50 μg/day >50 μg/day | 0.96 (0.88–1.04); 0.94 (0.85–1.03); 1.05 (0.88–1.24) |
| Menopausal hormone therapy | Transdermal | Estradiol/progestogen | 0.88 (0.73–1.01) |
| Menopausal hormone therapy | Vaginal | Estradiol alone | 0.84 (0.73–0.97) |
| Menopausal hormone therapy | Vaginal | Conjugated estrogens alone | 1.04 (0.76–1.43) |
| Combined birth control | Oral | Ethinylestradiol/norethisterone | 2.56 (2.15–3.06)* |
| Combined birth control | Oral | Ethinylestradiol/levonorgestrel | 2.38 (2.18–2.59)* |
| Combined birth control | Oral | Ethinylestradiol/norgestimate | 2.53 (2.17–2.96)* |
| Combined birth control | Oral | Ethinylestradiol/desogestrel | 4.28 (3.66–5.01)* |
| Combined birth control | Oral | Ethinylestradiol/gestodene | 3.64 (3.00–4.43)* |
| Combined birth control | Oral | Ethinylestradiol/drospirenone | 4.12 (3.43–4.96)* |
| Combined birth control | Oral | Ethinylestradiol/cyproterone acetate | 4.27 (3.57–5.11)* |
Notes: (1) Nested case–control studies (2015, 2019) based on data from the QResearch and Clinical Practice Research Datalink (CPRD) databases. (2) Bioidentical progesterone was not included, but is known to be associated with no additional risk relative to estrogen alone. Footnotes: * = Statistically significant (p < 0.01). Sources: See template.

=== Cardiovascular health ===
High-dose CPA for prostate cancer in men is associated with incidence of relatively mild cardiovascular side effects. These include coagulation changes and blood clots (5%), fluid retention (4%), ischemic cardiomyopathy (4–40%), and undesirable effects on serum lipid profiles. Severe cardiovascular complications occur in up to 10% at such doses and are sometimes fatal. A large randomized controlled trial that compared CPA and flutamide in men with prostate cancer found that the rates of cardiovascular problems were not significantly different between the two therapies. The cardiovascular toxicity of 250 mg/day CPA is significantly lower than that of 3 mg/day diethylstilbestrol.

=== Breast cancer ===
The Women's Health Initiative randomized controlled trials demonstrated a significantly increased risk of breast cancer with 0.625 mg/day conjugated estrogens and 2.5 mg/day medroxyprogesterone acetate (a progestin closely related to CPA) for menopausal hormone therapy relative to 0.625 mg/day conjugated estrogens alone and placebo in peri- and postmenopausal women. Similarly, estrogen plus low-dose CPA for menopausal hormone therapy has been associated with a significantly higher risk of breast cancer relative to estrogen alone and no use. In addition, a nationwide observational study found that estrogen plus high-dose CPA was associated with a 46-fold increased risk of breast cancer in transgender women relative to the expected incidence for cisgender men.

Risk of breast cancer with menopausal hormone therapy in large observational studies (Mirkin, 2018)
| Study | Therapy | Hazard ratio (95% CI) |
|---|---|---|
| E3N-EPIC: Fournier et al. (2005) | Estrogen alone | 1.1 (0.8–1.6) |
| E3N-EPIC: Fournier et al. (2005) | Estrogen plus progesterone Transdermal estrogen Oral estrogen | 0.9 (0.7–1.2); 0.9 (0.7–1.2); No events |
| E3N-EPIC: Fournier et al. (2005) | Estrogen plus progestin Transdermal estrogen Oral estrogen | 1.4 (1.2–1.7); 1.4 (1.2–1.7); 1.5 (1.1–1.9) |
| E3N-EPIC: Fournier et al. (2008) | Oral estrogen alone | 1.32 (0.76–2.29) |
| E3N-EPIC: Fournier et al. (2008) | Oral estrogen plus progestogen Progesterone; Dydrogesterone; Medrogestone; Chlormadinone acetate Cyproterone acetate Promegestone; Nomegestrol acetate Norethisterone acetate Medroxyprogesterone acetate | Not analyzed^{a} 0.77 (0.36–1.62); 2.74 (1.42–5.29); 2.02 (1.00–4.06); 2.57 (1.81–3.65); 1.62 (0.94–2.82); 1.10 (0.55–2.21); 2.11 (1.56–2.86); 1.48 (1.02–2.16) |
| E3N-EPIC: Fournier et al. (2008) | Transdermal estrogen alone | 1.28 (0.98–1.69) |
| E3N-EPIC: Fournier et al. (2008) | Transdermal estrogen plus progestogen Progesterone; Dydrogesterone; Medrogestone; Chlormadinone acetate Cyproterone acetate Promegestone; Nomegestrol acetate Norethisterone acetate Medroxyprogesterone acetate | 1.08 (0.89–1.31); 1.18 (0.95–1.48); 2.03 (1.39–2.97); 1.48 (1.05–2.09); Not analyzed^{a} 1.52 (1.19–1.96); 1.60 (1.28–2.01); Not analyzed^{a} Not analyzed^{a} |
| E3N-EPIC: Fournier et al. (2014) | Estrogen alone | 1.17 (0.99–1.38) |
| E3N-EPIC: Fournier et al. (2014) | Estrogen plus progesterone or dydrogesterone | 1.22 (1.11–1.35) |
| E3N-EPIC: Fournier et al. (2014) | Estrogen plus progestin | 1.87 (1.71–2.04) |
| CECILE: Cordina-Duverger et al. (2013) | Estrogen alone | 1.19 (0.69–2.04) |
| CECILE: Cordina-Duverger et al. (2013) | Estrogen plus progestogen Progesterone; Progestins; Progesterone derivatives Testosterone derivatives | 1.33 (0.92–1.92); 0.80 (0.44–1.43); 1.72 (1.11–2.65); 1.57 (0.99–2.49); 3.35 (1.07–10.4) |
Footnotes: ^{a} = Not analyzed, fewer than 5 cases. Sources: See template.

=== Other long-term effects ===
In terms of ovulation inhibition, the effective dosage of CPA is 1.0 mg/day while that of medroxyprogesterone acetate is 10 mg/day. Based on ovulation inhibition, a dosage of 50 mg/day cyproterone acetate has on the order of 200 times the progestogenic potency of 2.5 mg/day medroxyprogesterone acetate. In addition to its progestogenic activity, CPA produces androgen and estrogen deficiency when used as a monotherapy, and this influences health as well.

The health effects of high-dose CPA with long-term therapy have not been well-studied. A meta-analysis of high-dose CPA for the treatment of prostate cancer in men found that CPA was associated with a slight excess of non-prostate cancer deaths. In addition, the combination of CPA with surgical or medical castration for prostate cancer has been found to significantly decrease overall survival relative to castration alone.

Results of the Women's Health Initiative (WHI) menopausal hormone therapy randomized controlled trials
| Clinical outcome | Hypothesized effect on risk | Estrogen and progestogen (CEs 0.625 mg/day p.o. + MPA 2.5 mg/day p.o.) (n = 16,608, with uterus, 5.2–5.6 years follow up) | | | Estrogen alone (CEs 0.625 mg/day p.o.) (n = 10,739, no uterus, 6.8–7.1 years follow up) | | |
| Clinical outcome | Hypothesized effect on risk | HR | 95% CI | AR | HR | 95% CI | AR |
|---|---|---|---|---|---|---|---|
| Coronary heart disease | Decreased | 1.24 | 1.00–1.54 | +6 / 10,000 PYs | 0.95 | 0.79–1.15 | −3 / 10,000 PYs |
| Stroke | Decreased | 1.31 | 1.02–1.68 | +8 / 10,000 PYs | 1.37 | 1.09–1.73 | +12 / 10,000 PYs |
| Pulmonary embolism | Increased | 2.13 | 1.45–3.11 | +10 / 10,000 PYs | 1.37 | 0.90–2.07 | +4 / 10,000 PYs |
| Venous thromboembolism | Increased | 2.06 | 1.57–2.70 | +18 / 10,000 PYs | 1.32 | 0.99–1.75 | +8 / 10,000 PYs |
| Breast cancer | Increased | 1.24 | 1.02–1.50 | +8 / 10,000 PYs | 0.80 | 0.62–1.04 | −6 / 10,000 PYs |
| Colorectal cancer | Decreased | 0.56 | 0.38–0.81 | −7 / 10,000 PYs | 1.08 | 0.75–1.55 | +1 / 10,000 PYs |
| Endometrial cancer | – | 0.81 | 0.48–1.36 | −1 / 10,000 PYs | – | – | – |
| Hip fractures | Decreased | 0.67 | 0.47–0.96 | −5 / 10,000 PYs | 0.65 | 0.45–0.94 | −7 / 10,000 PYs |
| Total fractures | Decreased | 0.76 | 0.69–0.83 | −47 / 10,000 PYs | 0.71 | 0.64–0.80 | −53 / 10,000 PYs |
| Total mortality | Decreased | 0.98 | 0.82–1.18 | −1 / 10,000 PYs | 1.04 | 0.91–1.12 | +3 / 10,000 PYs |
| Global index | – | 1.15 | 1.03–1.28 | +19 / 10,000 PYs | 1.01 | 1.09–1.12 | +2 / 10,000 PYs |
| Diabetes | – | 0.79 | 0.67–0.93 | | 0.88 | 0.77–1.01 | |
| Gallbladder disease | Increased | 1.59 | 1.28–1.97 | | 1.67 | 1.35–2.06 | |
| Stress incontinence | – | 1.87 | 1.61–2.18 | | 2.15 | 1.77–2.82 | |
| Urge incontinence | – | 1.15 | 0.99–1.34 | | 1.32 | 1.10–1.58 | |
| Peripheral artery disease | – | 0.89 | 0.63–1.25 | | 1.32 | 0.99–1.77 | |
| Probable dementia | Decreased | 2.05 | 1.21–3.48 | | 1.49 | 0.83–2.66 | |
Abbreviations: CEs = conjugated estrogens. MPA = medroxyprogesterone acetate. p.o. = per oral. HR = hazard ratio. AR = attributable risk. PYs = person–years. CI = confidence interval. Notes: Sample sizes (n) include placebo recipients, which were about half of patients. "Global index" is defined for each woman as the time to earliest diagnosis for coronary heart disease, stroke, pulmonary embolism, breast cancer, colorectal cancer, endometrial cancer (estrogen plus progestogen group only), hip fractures, and death from other causes. Sources: See template.

== Androgenic or antiandrogenic effects ==
=== Lipid changes ===
High doses of CPA have been found to decrease levels of HDL ("good") cholesterol. Unfavorable blood lipid profile changes are a potential risk factor for cardiovascular disease like atherosclerosis or coronary heart disease. CPA has weak androgenic effects in the liver, which may be responsible for its adverse influence on the lipid profile. Unfavorable lipid changes have also been seen with other antiandrogens, for instance spironolactone and bicalutamide, and with androgenic medications.

The Women's Health Initiative randomized controlled trials demonstrated a significantly increased risk of coronary heart disease with 0.625 mg/day conjugated estrogens and 2.5 mg/day medroxyprogesterone acetate (a progestin closely related to CPA) for menopausal hormone therapy relative to 0.625 mg/day conjugated estrogens alone and placebo in peri- and postmenopausal women. Whether or not estrogen plus low-dose CPA alone has similar risks has not been studied and hence is unknown. Biomarker research suggests that the lower androgenic activity of CPA and reduced unfavorable effects on blood lipids may confer less or no coronary heart disease risk, but this has yet to be evaluated in clinical studies.

== Other side effects ==
=== Liver toxicity ===
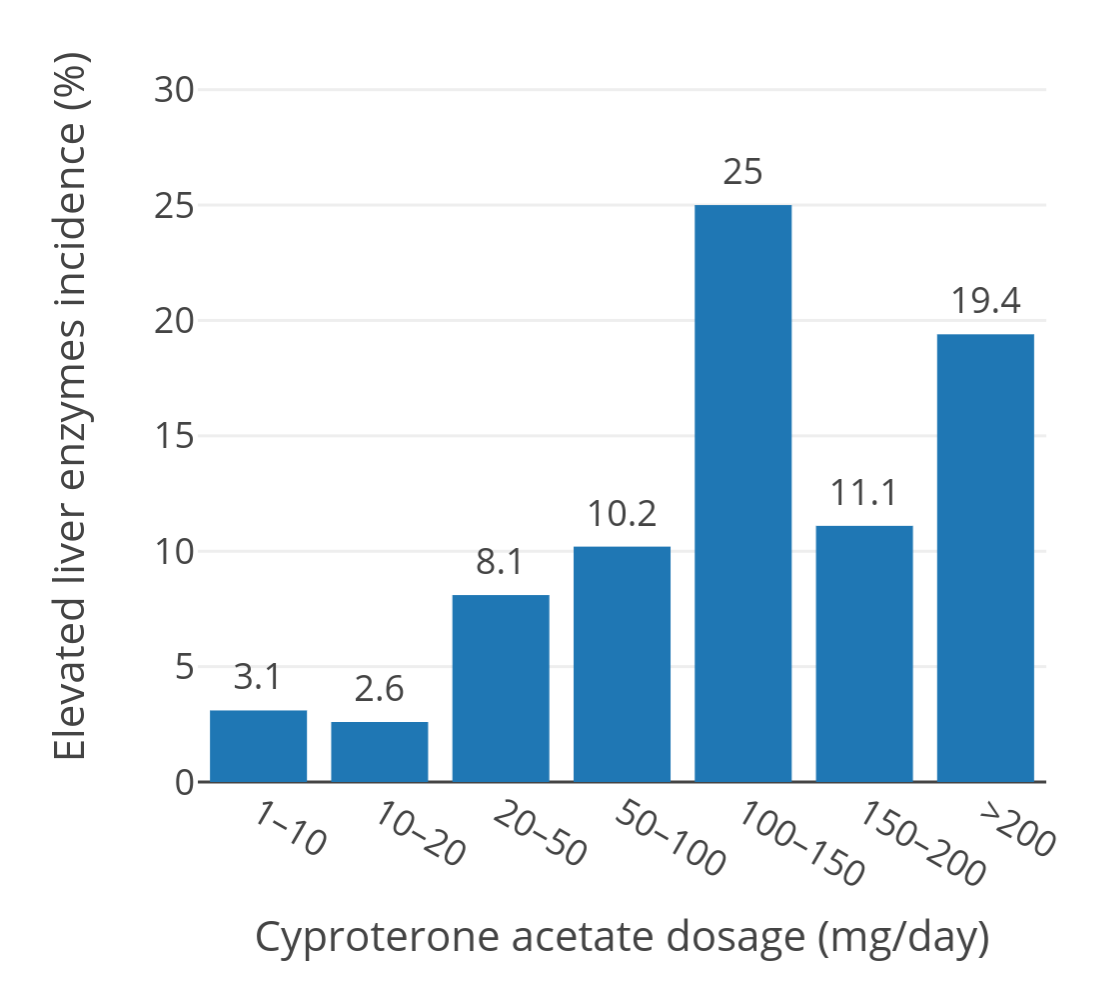
Incidences of elevated liver enzymes with different dosages of cyproterone acetate in 1,685 healthy males and females of all ages in a large active surveillance study.

The most serious potential side effect of CPA is hepatotoxicity. A variety of manifestations of liver disease in association with CPA treatment have been documented, including immunoallergic cytotoxic reactions, cholestasis, autoimmune hepatitis, acute hepatitis, fulminant liver failure, and cirrhosis, as well as an increased risk of hepatocellular carcinoma. Clinical features may include jaundice, fatigue, nausea, elevated liver enzymes, hepatic necrosis and inflammation, and features of hepatic decompensation. Hepatotoxicity due to CPA therapy is most common in elderly patients who are treated with high dosages of the drug for prolonged periods of time, but has also occurred in younger patients. The hepatotoxicity of CPA is related to its C1α,2α methylene group.

In an uncontrolled open-label active surveillance study of 1,685 healthy males and females of all ages (3 to 75 years for the full sample of 2,506 individuals) treated with CPA for an average of 6.7 years (but in 602 individuals for up to more than 10 years), elevated liver enzymes were seen in 2.6 to 3.1% of individuals at a dosage of 1 to 20 mg/day, in 8.1% of individuals at a dosage of 20 to 50 mg/day, in 10.2% of individuals at a dosage of 50 to 100 mg/day, and in 11.1 to 25.0% of individuals at a dosage of greater than 100 mg/day (up to more than 200 mg/day). In a trial of 89 men with prostate cancer who received 50 mg/day CPA for 4 years, elevated liver enzymes occurred in 28.2%. A study of 105 patients treated with 150 mg/day CPA reported a hepatotoxicity rate of 9.5%, with serious liver injury occurring in 3.8% (4/105). A study of 303 transgender women treated with high-dose estrogen and 100 mg/day CPA reported an incidence of elevated liver enzymes of 7.2% (22/303).

In 2002, it was reported that there were 18 published case reports of CPA-associated hepatitis in the literature, with 6 of these cases resulting in death. In addition however, a 1995 publication by the United Kingdom Medicines Control Agency/Committee on Safety of Medicines in its journal Current Problems in Pharmacovigilance described an additional 96 spontaneous reports of hepatotoxicity (91 males, 5 females), with 33 of these cases resulting in death. The manifestations of hepatotoxicity described in this publication included hepatitis, cholestatic jaundice, and liver failure. The majority of cases were men being treated with very high doses of CPA (300 mg/day) for prostate cancer. A 2014 review found that 9 cases specifically of CPA-induced fulminant (sudden-onset and severe) liver failure had been reported to date, with only one of these cases not being fatal. As such, the prognosis of CPA-induced liver failure is death. However, serious hepatotoxicity occurs mostly in prostate cancer patients who take very high doses of CPA, and serious liver toxicity has not been reported in transgender women. All 14 reported cases of serious hepatotoxicity (acute liver failure and acute hepatitis) with CPA described in the 2014 review were in a dosage range of 100 to 300 mg/day and were in elderly men with prostate cancer (age range 65 to 92 years). A 2015 publication reported an additional 22 new cases of hepatotoxicity in association with CPA, including one case at 50 mg/day.

The risk of hepatotoxicity and death associated with CPA treatment is reportedly the reason that CPA has not been approved by the FDA for use in the United States. Patients being treated with high-dose CPA should be closely monitored with liver function tests. The risk is dose-dependent, and the low doses of CPA used in birth control pills (2 mg) have been said to represent a non-significant risk. However, a German woman who had been taking Diane-35 (containing 2 mg/day CPA) for contraception for 14 years died of liver cancer, and this led to a safety review by drug regulators and the eventual restriction of CPA throughout Europe for the indication of acne treatment in women. In any case, liver toxicity with CPA occurs mostly in prostate cancer patients who take very high doses of the medication (200–300 mg/day), and liver toxicity has not been reported in cisgender or transgender women, who usually take lower doses (25–100 mg/day). However, in 2021, a case report of liver failure and death with 25 mg/day CPA in a young cisgender woman taking it for treatment of hirsutism was published.

The hepatotoxicity of the nonsteroidal antiandrogen flutamide is greater than that of CPA. In a randomized controlled trial and direct head-to-head comparison for prostate cancer, overall rates of liver function deterioration were 9.9% in the 750 mg/day flutamide group (n = 151) and 5.3% in the 300 mg/day oral CPA group (n = 152) (p = 0.128), while liver toxicity requiring discontinuation occurred in 8.6% (13 of 151) in the flutamide group and 2.0% (3 of 152) in the CPA group. Findings were similar in another randomized controlled trial and direct head-to-head comparison of 750 mg/day flutamide and 150 mg/day oral CPA; the rates of hepatotoxicity were 15.3% (19 of 124) for flutamide and 9.5% (10 of 105) for CPA (p = 0.034) and the rates of serious hepatotoxicity were 4.8% (6 of 124) for flutamide and 3.8% (4 of 105) for CPA. A 2004 review cited 46 published cases of hepatotoxicity in association with flutamide, 21 cases with CPA, 4 cases with nilutamide, and 1 case with bicalutamide, all between 1986 and 2003. It should be noted however that some of these antiandrogens, like nilutamide and bicalutamide, were introduced after 1986 and hence were launched more recently than the others.

There are case reports of suspected cross-hepatotoxicity between CPA and flutamide. As such, CPA and flutamide may be cross-reactive in terms of hepatotoxicity. The hepatotoxicity of CPA may be dependent on age, with greater risk in older people.

Published case reports of cyproterone acetate-associated liver toxicity
| # | Sex | Age | Dosage | Type | Onset | Outcome | Survival^{a} | Ref | Link |
|---|---|---|---|---|---|---|---|---|---|
| 1 | Female | 73 years | 400 mg/day | AH | 2.5 months | Survived | N/A | Meijers et al. (1986) | |
| 2 | Female | 85 years | 200 mg/day | AH | 4.8 months | Survived | N/A | Meijers et al. (1986) | |
| 3 | Male | 78 years | 200 mg/day | ALF | 6 months | Death | 2 weeks | Lévesque et al. (1989) | |
| 4 | Male | 71 years | 300 mg/day | AH | 5.3 months | Survived | N/A | Blake et al. (1990) | |
| 5 | Male | 79 years | 200–300 mg/day | AH | 2.5 months | Survived | N/A | Dore et al. (1990) | |
| 6 | Male | 80 years | 200 mg/day | ALF | 7 months | Death | ~1–2 months | Antoni et al. (1991) | |
| 7 | Male | 75 years | 300 mg/day | HCC | 1.5 years | ND | ND | Ohri et al. (1991) | |
| 8 | Male | 72 years | 300 mg/day | ALF | ND | Survived | N/A | Parys et al. (1991) | |
| 9 | Male | 65 years | 300 mg/day | ALF | 1 year | Death | 1.6 months | Parys et al. (1991) | |
| 10 | Male | 83 years | 300 mg/day | ALF | 1.25 years | Death | 2 weeks | Parys et al. (1991) | |
| 11 | Male | 78 years | 150 mg/day | AH | ~3 months | Survived | N/A | Drakos et al. (1992) | |
| 12 | Female | 24 years | 100 mg/day (RS) | CH | 3 months | Survived | N/A | Hassler et al. (1992) | |
| 13 | Male | 74 years | 200 mg/day | AH | 11 months | Survived | N/A | Roila et al. (1993) | |
| 14 | Male | 79 years | 300 mg/day | ALF | 10 months | Death | 2 weeks | Bressollette et al. (1994) | |
| 15 | Male | 92 years | 100 mg/day | ALF | 4 months | Death | 5 weeks | Hirsch et al. (1994) | |
| 16 | Male | 65 years | 600 mg/day | HCC | 4 months | Survived | N/A | Kattan et al. (1994) | |
| 17 | Female | 22 years | 100–250 mg/day | HCC | 10 years | Death | 9 months | Watanabe et al. (1994) | |
| 18 | Female | 19 years | 200–300 mg/day | HCC | 9 years | Survived | N/A | Watanabe et al. (1994) | |
| 19 | Female | 19 years | 200 mg/day | HCC | ~10 years | Survived | N/A | Watanabe et al. (1994) | |
| 20 | Male | 87 years | 200 mg/day | ALF | 4 months | Death | ~3.5 weeks | Pinganaud et al. (1995) | |
| 21 | Male | 78 years | 150 mg/day | ALF | 1 year | Death | 3 weeks | Pinganaud et al. (1995) | |
| 22 | Female | 45 years | 2 mg/day (BCP) | HCC | 14 years | Death | 9 months | Rüdiger et al. (1995) | |
| 23 | Male | 78 years | 200–300 mg/day | ALF | 3 months | Death | 9 months | Castellani et al. (1996) | |
| 24 | Male | 73 years | 300 mg/day | ALF | 4 months | Survived | N/A | Murphy et al. (1996) | |
| 25 | Male | 64 years | 100 mg/day | AH | 6 months | Survived | N/A | Ruiz-Rebollo et al. (1997) | |
| 26 | Female | ≥8 years | 200–300 mg/day | HCC | >4 years | Survived | N/A | Watanabe et al. (1997) | |
| 27 | Male | 21 years | 100–350 mg/day | HCC | 15 years | Survived | N/A | Watanabe et al. (1997) | |
| 28 | Male | 84 years | ND | ALF | ND | Death | 1 week | Lombardi et al. (1998) | |
| 29 | Male | 81 years | 300 mg/day | ALF | 6 months | Death | 1.6 months | Friedman et al. (1999) | |
| 30 | Male | 66 years | 300 mg/day | ALF | 2 months | Death | 4 weeks | Friedman et al. (1999) | |
| 31 | Male | 14 years | 100 mg/day | Cirrhosis | ~7.5 years | Death | ~1 year | Garty et al. (1999) | |
| 32 | Male | 84 years | 100–300 mg/day | HCC | 10 years | Death | 6 days | Manfredi et al. (2000) | |
| 33 | Male | 87 years | 300 mg/day | AH | ND | Survived | N/A | Giordano et al. (2001) | |
| 34 | Female | 17 years | 2 mg/day (BCP) | AIH/cirrhosis | 2 months | Survived | N/A | Kacar et al. (2002) | |
| 35 | Male | 76 years | 150 mg/day | AH | 7 months | Survived | N/A | Manolakopoulos et al. (2004) | |
| 36 | Male | 78 years | 200 mg/day | ALF | 3 months | Death | 1.0 months | Famularo et al. (2005) | |
| 37 | Male | 82 years | 200 mg/day | AH | 12 months | Survived | N/A | Savidou et al. (2006) | |
| 38 | Male | 83 years | 300 mg/day | AH | 7 months | Death | 1.4 months | Savidou et al. (2006) | |
| 39 | Male | 78 years | 300 mg/day | AH | 3 months | Survived | N/A | Savidou et al. (2006) | |
| 40 | Male | 78 years | 150 mg/day | ALF | 2 months | Survived | N/A | Miquel et al. (2007) | |
| 41^{b} | Female | 22 years | 2 mg/day (BCP) | BCS | 7 days | ND | ND | He et al. (2009) | |
| 42 | Male | 89 years | 150–300 mg/day | ALF | 3.2 months | Death | 28 days | Kim et al. (2009) | |
| 43 | Male | 71 years | 100–200 mg/day | ALF | 2–3 months | Death | 20 days | Hsu et al. (2011) | |
| 44 | Male | 66 years | 200 mg/day | AH/cirrhosis | 4 months | Survived | N/A | Abenavoli et al. (2013) | |
| 45 | Male | 75 years | 200 mg/day | ALF | 9 months | Survived | N/A | Vodička et al. (2013) | |
| 46 | Male | 87 years | 200 mg/day | ALF | 6 months | Death | 20 days | Kim et al. (2014) | |
| 47 | Male | 80 years | 150 mg/day | AH | 4.0 months | Survived | N/A | Bessone et al. (2016) | |
| 48 | Male | 73 years | 200 mg/day | AH | 2.1 months | Survived | N/A | Bessone et al. (2016) | |
| 49 | Male | 54 years | 200 mg/day | AIH | 4.0 months | Survived | N/A | Bessone et al. (2016) | |
| 50 | Male | 60 years | 200 mg/day | AH | 1.1 months | Survived | N/A | Bessone et al. (2016) | |
| 51 | Male | 74 years | 200 mg/day | AH | 5.1 months | Survived | N/A | Bessone et al. (2016) | |
| 52 | Male | 66 years | 150 mg/day | ALF | 3.2 months | Death | ND | Bessone et al. (2016) | |
| 53 | Male | 77 years | 100 mg/day | AH | 8.1 months | Survived | N/A | Bessone et al. (2016) | |
| 54 | Male | 72 years | 200 mg/day | AH | 5.0 months | Survived | N/A | Bessone et al. (2016) | |
| 55 | Male | 80 years | 200 mg/day | AH | 1.9 months | Survived | N/A | Bessone et al. (2016) | |
| 56 | Male | 69 years | 100 mg/day | AH | 4.1 months | Survived | N/A | Bessone et al. (2016) | |
| 57 | Male | 58 years | 200 mg/day | AH | 10.1 months | Survived | N/A | Bessone et al. (2016) | |
| 58 | Male | 83 years | 100 mg/day | AH | 2.1 months | Survived | N/A | Bessone et al. (2016) | |
| 59 | Male | 75 years | 200 mg/day | AH | 4.9 months | Survived | N/A | Bessone et al. (2016) | |
| 60 | Male | 72 years | 100 mg/day | AH | 8.0 months | Survived | N/A | Bessone et al. (2016) | |
| 61 | Male | 72 years | 50 mg/day | AH | 5.9 months | Survived | N/A | Bessone et al. (2016) | |
| 62 | Male | 66 years | 100 mg/day | AH/CH | 1.2 years | Survived | N/A | Bessone et al. (2016) | |
| 63 | Male | 58 years | 200 mg/day | ALF | 5.0 months | Death | ND | Bessone et al. (2016) | |
| 64 | Male | 75 years | 200 mg/day | ALF | 7.9 months | Death | ND | Bessone et al. (2016) | |
| 65 | Male | 74 years | 150 mg/day | AH | 9.9 months | Survived | N/A | Bessone et al. (2016) | |
| 66 | Male | 64 years | 100 mg/day | AH | 3.3 months | Survived | N/A | Bessone et al. (2016) | |
| 67 | Male | 64 years | 150 mg/day | AH/CH | 4.9 months | Survived | N/A | Bessone et al. (2016) | |
| 68 | Male | 64 years | 150 mg/day | AH/cirrhosis | 4.9 months | Survived | N/A | Bessone et al. (2016) | |
| 69 | Male | 61 years | 300 mg/day | ALF | 3 months | Death | 2.6 months | Nour et al. (2017) | |
| 70 | Female | 30 years | 25 mg/day | ALF | 6 months | Death | 4 days | Kumar et al. (2021) | |
Abbreviations: BCP = Birth control pill. RS = Reverse sequential (days 5–25 of cycle). ALF = Acute liver failure (fulminant liver failure). AH = Acute hepatitis. CH = Cholestatic hepatitis. AIH = Autoimmune hepatitis. HCC = Hepatocellular carcinoma. BCS = Budd–Chiari syndrome. ND = No data. N/A = Not applicable. Footnotes: ^{a} = Time until death after onset of liver toxicity. ^{b} = Probably related to ethinylestradiol rather than to cyproterone acetate. Notes: Many additional cases have been described in spontaneous adverse drug reaction reporting systems of individual countries. These include 19 cases (5 deaths) by late 1988 and 96 cases (91 males, 5 females; 33 deaths) by early 1995 in the United Kingdom; 32 cases (deaths not given) in Australia by 2004; and 15 cases (no deaths) in Spain by 2006. The cases from Bessone et al. (2016) were reported between 1993 and 2013 and were from Spanish and Latin American drug-induced liver injury databases (17 cases in Argentina, 2 cases in Uruguay, 3 cases in Spain). Worldwide, 153 cases of liver abnormalities were reported to Schering, the manufacturer, between 1982 and 1987. In a large observational study of 2,506 patients, Heinemann et al. (1997) reported 7 cases of benign liver tumors and no cases of serious liver toxicity or HCC. Large observational studies have found no increased risk of liver toxicity or HCC with cyproterone acetate at BCP doses. A fatal case of ALF in a common chimpanzee has also been reported. Sources:

=== Vitamin B12 deficiency ===
Both low-dose (2 mg/day) and high-dose CPA combined with an estrogen have been associated with decreased serum vitamin B12 levels in women in some small studies. This is in line with other findings of decreased vitamin B12 levels in users of oral contraceptives in general. However it has been noted that this decrease in levels might not represent a true deficiency and could instead be related to changes in serum vitamin B12 binders.

As vitamin B12 deficiency has been associated with depression, anxiety, irritability, and fatigue due to depletion of central monoamine neurotransmitters, it has been suggested that low vitamin B12 levels might be involved in the side effect of depression that has sometimes been associated with CPA. Serum vitamin B12 monitoring and supplementation (e.g., 100 to 200 μg/day orally) as necessary may be recommended during CPA therapy.

=== Miscellaneous ===
CPA has been associated rarely with retinal vascular disorder, retinal vein thrombosis, and optic neuritis. A case report of symptomatic epidural lipomatosis in association with CPA therapy has been published. A published case report of lymphocytic pneumonitis in associated with CPA also exists. There is a case report of severe stretch marks in association with CPA therapy.

== Dosage dependence ==
Belisle and Love (1986) directly compared Diane (ethinylestradiol 50 μg/day and CPA 2 mg/day) alone versus the combination of Diane and CPA 100 mg/day (Androcur) in 158 women with hirsutism. They reported no differences in mean incidences of side effects including menometrorrhagia (9.9%), acne (6.5%), decreased libido (9.5%), edema (9.3%), nausea (17.5%), vomiting (4.8%), headache (20.3%), and depression (12.7%). Conversely, the incidences of fatigue and amenorrhea were significantly greater in the Diane plus Androcur group relative to the Diane alone group (6.7% vs. 2.5% and 5.4–32.6% vs. 0–4.2%, respectively), the incidence of breast tenderness was significantly lower in the Diane plus Androcur group than in the Diane alone group (3.6–26.3% vs. 12.5–46.4%), and the percent gain in body weight relative to baseline was significantly greater in the Diane plus Androcur group than in the Diane alone group (6.3% vs. 1.1% at 12 months).

CPA at relatively low doses, for instance 10–20 mg/day, has been reported in small studies to cause few to no side effects in men. Conversely, CPA at higher doses, for instance 100 mg/day or greater, has been reported to produce a variety of side effects in men including decreased libido, erectile dysfunction, gynecomastia, tiredness, weakness, decreased efficiency, weight gain, skin dryness, skin peeling, and decreased body hair (e.g., trunk and pubic region).

Side effects of estrogen plus high- versus low-dose cyproterone acetate in women
| Side effect | High-dose (Note: Reverse sequential regimen: In women with hirsutism, cyproterone acetate 100 mg/day from days 5 to 14 of the menstrual cycle and ethinylestradiol 50 μg/day from days 5 to 25 of the cycle.) (n = 602) (%) | Low-dose (Note: Diane: In women with hirsutism, cyproterone acetate 2 mg/day and ethinylestradiol 50 μg/day from days 5 to 25 of the cycle.) (n = 226) (%) |
|---|---|---|
| Fatigue | 22.0 | 13.0 |
| Weight gain (>2 kg or >4.4 lbs) | 18.5 | 5.5 |
| Decreased libido | 10.0 | 6.0 |
| Breast discomfort | 9.2 | 15.0 |
| Nausea | 9.0 | 3.9 |
| Headaches | 7.3 | 10.4 |
| Depression | 5.1 | 2.0 |
| Irregular uterine bleeding | 3.5 | 7.2 |
| Sleep disturbance | 3.5 | – |
| Thrombophlebitis | 1.0 | 3.0 |
| Chloasma | 0.9 | – |
| Constipation | 0.5 | – |
| Thrombosis | 0.15 | 0.9 |
| Heavy legs or cramps | – | 4.6 |
Footnotes: Sources: See template.

== Withdrawal ==
=== Adrenal insufficiency ===
Abrupt withdrawal of CPA can be harmful, and the package insert from Schering AG recommends the daily dose be reduced by no more than 50 mg at intervals of several weeks. The concern is the manner in which CPA affects the adrenal glands. Due to its glucocorticoid activity, high levels of CPA may reduce ACTH, resulting in adrenal insufficiency if discontinued abruptly. In addition, although CPA reduces androgen production in the gonads, it can increase the production of adrenal androgens, in some cases resulting in an overall rise in testosterone levels. Thus, the sudden withdrawal of CPA could result in undesirable androgenic effects. This is a particular concern because androgens, especially DHT, suppress adrenal function, further reducing corticosteroid production.

Suppression of adrenal function and reduced response to adrenocorticotropic hormone (ACTH) have been reported with CPA treatment. As a result, adrenal insufficiency and hence low cortisol and aldosterone levels and ACTH responsiveness can occur upon discontinuation of CPA. Low aldosterone levels may lead to hyponatremia (sodium loss) and hyperkalemia (excess potassium). Patients taking CPA should have their cortisol levels and electrolytes monitored, and if hyperkalemia develops, should reduce the consumption of foods with high potassium content or discontinue the medication.
