= Electronic health records in England =

In 2005 the National Health Service (NHS) in the United Kingdom began deployment of electronic health record systems in NHS Trusts. The goal was to have all patients with a centralized electronic health record by 2010. Lorenzo patient record systems were adopted in a number of NHS trusts. While many hospitals acquired electronic patient records systems in this process, there was no national healthcare information exchange. Ultimately, the program was dismantled after a cost to the UK taxpayer was over $24 billion (£12 billion), and is considered one of the most expensive healthcare IT failures.

In November 2013 NHS England launched a clinical digital maturity index to measure the digital maturity of NHS providers but 40% of NHS managers surveyed by the Health Service Journal did not know their ranking, and the same proportion said improving their ranking was of low or very low priority. in 2022 the 211 trusts progress was assessed. 43 trusts had an EPR meeting NHSE's required standard, 138 had an EPR requiring "extension/optimisation" and 30 trusts did not have an EPR. Of those 30, 23 were procuring or developing plans to procure new EPRs and 7 were in the process of rolling out record systems.

Electronic palliative care coordination systems have been developed by Marie Curie Cancer Care and the Royal College of General Practitioners which mean that terminally ill patients no longer have to explain their circumstances afresh to every new professional they meet and are less likely to be inappropriately taken to hospital.

== Personalised Health and Care 2020 ==
The publication of Personalised Health and Care 2020 by the Department of Health elaborated a new attempt to integrate patient records. Its stated ambition was that every citizen would be able securely to access their health records online by 2018 and make real time data available to paramedics, doctors and nurses. A real time record across health and social care is seen as the key to the provision of integrated care.

== Hospital systems ==
Transferring hospital records to electronic systems has generally been much slower and more difficult than in primary care, apart from clinical imaging, which has been largely electronic for several years. In 2019 only 10% of NHS trusts claimed to be fully digitised. The NHS Long Term Plan requires all hospitals to move to digital records by 2023, so clinicians can access and interact with patient records and care plans wherever they are. As of 2019, 62% of trusts have plans to digitise all their patient records.

== GP Systems ==
GP2GP is an NHS Connecting for Health project in the United Kingdom. It enables GPs to transfer a patient's electronic medical record to another practice when the patient moves onto the list. In General Practice in the UK the medical record has been computerized for many years; in fact, the UK is probably one of the world leaders in this field. There are very few General Practices in the UK which are not computerized. Unlike those in the USA, UK GPs have not had to deal with billing, and thus have been able to concentrate on clinical care. The GP record is separate from the national Care Record and contains far more data. Shaun O'Hanlon, EMIS's Chief Clinical Officer says that the legal framework around data sharing is the main problem in integrating patient data because the Data Protection Act 1998 puts responsibilities on GPs to protect the confidentiality of patient data, but at the same time they have a "duty to share" when it is in the best interests of the patient. He says the quickest, easiest route to large scale record sharing is to put patients in the driving seat using smartphone technology. He quotes a YouGov poll, which found that 85% of the population wanted any medical professional directly responsible for their treatment to have secure electronic access to key data from their GP record, such as long term conditions, medication history or allergies.

Clinical IT suppliers are moving towards greater interoperability, already achieved with the GP2GP project, allowing different systems to exchange complete medical records between practices. There are projects allowing access between hospitals & GP practices. The main Primary Care systems are EMIS Health, SystmOne, iSOFT, and INPS Vision. The NHS in Scotland widely used GPASS until 2012. From April 2014 practices are contractually required to promote and offer patients the opportunity to book appointments online, order repeat prescriptions online and provide online patient record access.

The assistant coroner for inner north London has twice written to Jeremy Hunt warning that "future deaths could occur [if] further action is not taken to facilitate secondary care access to GP records".

Leeds was the first city to implement the NHS Digital programme GP Connect. This makes patient records available across care settings, including social care, general practice, community, mental health and hospitals.

== Patient access ==
It has been possible for patients to access their own medical records online for some time. By 2013, the debates had moved onto discussing the impact of patient access on patient care.

== Research ==
=== Prescription errors ===
A study in the UK tested the Salford Medication Safety Dashboard (SMASH), a web application to help GPs and pharmacists find people in their electronic health records who might face safety hazards due to prescription errors. The dashboard was successfully used in identifying and helping patients with already registered unsafe prescriptions and later it helped monitoring new cases as they appeared.

== See also ==
- NHS Connecting for Health
- Patient record access in the United Kingdom
