= Patient Online =

British digitalisation programme

Patient Online is an NHS England programme to encourage GPs deliver the British government’s promise to give patients in England access to their GP records and to let them book appointments and order prescriptions online.

Patients have been able to book online appointments since at least 2009. Dr Amir Hannan pioneered record access for patients when he took over Harold Shipman's practice. Since March 2015 95% of practices have been in a position to offer these services but progress has been generally slow. EMIS Health reported in 2013 that more than 385,000 patients were using their online access software, an increase of 40% over the previous year. Jeremy Hunt gave practices a 2015 deadline to roll out online access, but the deadline passed without very much progress.

Dr Masood Nazir, of Our Health Partnership, who is the national clinical lead, won the NHS Chief Clinical Information Officer's award for clinical informatics leadership in October 2016. According to Dr Nazir practices see the advantages of offering prescription services online, but appointment booking is a bit harder and access to records is “much harder” because there are real issues with making sure that no inappropriate information is revealed. In September 2016 1.4 million prescriptions and 1.2 million appointments were being booked in England each month; 70% more than September 2015. He wants every Clinical Commissioning Group to have a Chief Clinical Information Officer to drive forward local digital strategies. The General medical services contract makes it clear that practices have to help anyone who wants it to sign up for patient-facing services.

The Care Quality Commission proposes to assess how GPs and GP out-of-hours services are making use of technology to ‘ensure timely access’ for patients under a new assessment framework from October 2017.

According to the Nuffield trust "the impact of patient-facing technology on the NHS is still unclear." Their report suggests that it can improve care for patients and reduce strain on the stretched health service – particularly for people with long-term conditions such as diabetes or Chronic obstructive pulmonary disease, but they are concerned that digital technology could increase demand for services, disengage staff and potentially disrupt the way that patients access care. Dr Brian Fisher claims that online record access is safer, especially for those with long term conditions, because patients can share their information with other providers, improves trust, improves compliance with medical advice, and saves time by reducing the demand for appointments and telephone calls.

See also Patient record access in the United Kingdom
