= QResearch =

UK health database

QResearch is a large consolidated UK database derived from the anonymised health records of over 18 million patients.

As of 2016 the data is taken from around 1,000 general practices throughout the UK. Historical records extend back to the early 1990s.

The database is open, with ethical restrictions, to academic researchers. The costs are controlled to allow the scheme to be self-funding while allowing good access to researchers.

== QSurveillance ==
QSurveillance is a near-real-time surveillance scheme to collect, analyse and report on rates of infectious diseases and influenza-related conditions, flu vaccine and pneumococcal vaccine uptake. The UK Health Protection Agency have quoted QSurveillance statistics during the 2009 flu pandemic in the United Kingdom.

== See also ==
- Clinical Practice Research Datalink
- Optimum Patient Care Research Database (OPCRD)
- The Health Improvement Network
