= SystmOne =

British electronic patient record

SystmOne is a centrally hosted clinical computer system developed by Horsforth-based The Phoenix Partnership (TPP). It is used by healthcare professionals in the UK predominantly in primary care. The system is being deployed as one of the accredited systems in the government's programme of modernising IT in the NHS.

== Applications ==
SystmOne is one of the computer systems available to GPs under the Systems of Choice scheme from 2008, as well as through Local Service Provider, the CSC. Like other GP systems it makes extensive use of Read codes. Like most other GP systems all data is held on remote servers. It can be accessed using a mobile phone. It is widely used in TPP's home county of Yorkshire and is the system supporting the Born in Bradford project.

The system is used to connect all prisons in England to a single clinical IT system for healthcare across the 133 prisons and young offender institutions and three immigration centres. The prison system does not communicate with the systems used by the NHS.

SystmOne is available as a number of different modules designed for different care settings. Modules for GP, prisons, child health, community units and palliative care are currently widely used throughout the NHS. In 2013, a number of secondary care modules were rolled out. These include modules for community and acute hospitals, accident and emergency, maternity, mental health and social services. TPP are involved in the development of electronic patient record systems converting large numbers of paper records into digital form. This enables GPs, community services and care homes to share access to records, with the patient's consent, enabling the ordering of clinical tests and medication without the need to visit the institution. Visiting clinical staff can use IT equipment in the institution to access patient records. SystmOne Maternity is used by Torbay and South Devon NHS Foundation Trust for all their maternity services.

In England EMIS Health and SystmOne have a duopoly. The pair were paid £77 million for primary care software in 2018.

It is possible to use the system to send automated text messages to patients such as reminders for influenza vaccine.

== Research ==
The company has a close relationship with researchers at the University of Leeds with whom it developed an electronic frailty index. The company has a database with 6 million de-identified patient records, called ResearchOne, which in 2015 supported 40 to 50 research projects. About half have the potential to inform new clinical decision support tools. One is the Screening Tool of Older People's potentially inappropriate Prescriptions (STOPP) developed in Newton Abbot. This is intended to alert prescribers to risky combinations of medication. SystmOne permits rapid sharing of such applications.

== Data sharing ==
SystmOne supports Summary Care Records. In March 2015 the company made an agreement to share patient data with competitor EMIS Health, after IMS MAXIMS had released an open-source version of its software that health trusts can tailor to their needs. The companies say they hope to deliver functionality to support cross-organisational working, such as shared tasks and shared appointment booking. This agreement is independent of the medical interoperability gateway.

In October 2015 it was reported that the company was working with Central London Community Healthcare NHS Trust and Waltham Forest Clinical Commissioning Group on two pilots that will allow users of its software to see patient records on EMISweb and vice versa without any external software.

== Issues ==
On 21 March 2017 the Information Commissioner's Office issued a statement regarding the enhanced data sharing model of SystmOne.

In July 2018, both houses of the UK Parliament were informed of a software error that resulted in patient's data being shared against their express wishes. While GPs could record that patients had opted out of their data being used for any other purpose than their own personal care, that opt out wasn't passed on. The result is that data from 150,000 patients was disseminated by NHS Digital for audit and research purposes.

In August 2018 there were problems with the repeat prescription system. More than 10,000 prescriptions that were cancelled on SystmOne software were not cancelled on systems used by community pharmacists. Later in August 20,000 updates made to patients' GP records using SystmOne were not transferred to their Summary Care Record.

== See also ==
- EMIS Health
- Microtest Health
- VisionHealth
