= General Practice Administration System for Scotland =

Medical software

GPASS, General Practice Administration System for Scotland, is a clinical record and practice administration software package that was previously in widespread by Scottish general medical practitioners. It launched in 1984 and became dominant in the market while still being in public ownership, but a loss of confidence in it led to other systems being adopted and it had been largely been replaced by 2012.

== History ==
GPASS was established in 1984, building upon software originally developed by Dr David Ferguson, a general practitioner (GP) in Glasgow and software developer. Since 1984, there was financial support from the Scottish Home and Health Department, later from the Scottish Government. Development and support was via NHS NHS National Services Scotland, GPASS based at Seaforth House in Paisley, before moving to the Cirrus building near Glasgow Airport.

GPASS, whose software was free to GPs in Scotland, was initially used administrative functions, and later used during consultations too. Since 1988 data on morbidity and repeat prescribing was extracted from the systems. By 1993 around 77% of practices were using GPASS. A decade later it was still widely used with 800 Scottish general medical practices (around 80% of the primary care doctors in the county) using it as a clinical record and practice administration software. In 2005, with a new deal around system choice having been reached for Scottish GPs, a new version GPASS Clinical was in active development, although wasn't being rolled out at a pace that users were satisfied with. Many of its supporters though cite its public ownership as a positivum.

In January 2006 details of a software problem emerged, where text had been truncated in some instances. In Spring 2006 a decision was reached by the Scottish GP representatives (the British Medical Association's Scottish LMC conference) to call for immediate abandonment of any further development of the software, claiming that it was hopelessly out of date and "not fit for purpose". The Scottish Executive dismissed in a report to parliament some of these complaints as secondary to inadequate hardware rather than inherent problems within the software.

In November 2006 a report to the Scottish Executive from Deloitte on General Practice Information Technology Options recommended a move to commercial alternatives. However, the report noted that currently available commercial systems were no more suitable for purpose than GPASS. Further, it was noted that no single supplier of clinical database systems is likely to be able to meet the requirements of the Scottish Executive as at the time of the report's publication.

In 2008, with 60% of Scotland's GP practices still using GPASS, a national procurement was announced as part of a managed transition off the platform. Procurement began in July 2009. The planned date for retiral of the GPASS service was March 2012. By August 2012 all GP practices had migrated to either INPS Vision or EMIS PCS.
