= GPRD =

GPRD may refer to:

- General Practice Research Database, a large United Kingdom medical record database from 1994 to 2012
- Greater Pearl River Delta, a major Chinese economic region

== See also ==
- General Data Protection Regulation (GDPR), an EU regulation
