= The Phoenix Partnership =

UK-based IT company

The Phoenix Partnership (Leeds) Ltd
- Industry: Information technology; Health care
- Founded: 1997; 29 years ago in Leeds, United Kingdom
- Founder: Frank Hester
- Headquarters: Horsforth, Leeds
- Products: SystmOne; SystmConnect; SystmOnline; SystmInsight

The Phoenix Partnership (Leeds) Ltd (TPP) is a software company based in Horsforth, Leeds. It develops and supplies clinical software including SystmOne.

== History ==
The partnership was formed in 1997 by Frank Hester, a computer programmer married to a GP, to create a patient-record storing system that would help GPs after witnessing his wife's "constant struggle with the lack of connectivity and integration between NHS services". The system that was created, SystmOne, was developed the following year as a clinical IT system that linked a GP practice and a diabetes service in Bradford, UK.

=== Growth ===
By 2012, TPP's SystmOne held enough patient records that it could be used as a research database. In partnership with the University of Leeds and the UK Government's Technology Strategy Board, in May TPP launched ResearchOne as a not-for-profit health and care research database.

The company significantly increased its market opportunities when the then prime minister, David Cameron, invited it on trading missions to both India and China in 2013. By January the following year, it signed its first memorandum of understanding with a Chinese province, the Zhejiang provincial centre for disease prevention and control. In 2016, the company signed its first contract in the Middle East when it agreed with Qatari Integrated Intelligence Services to deliver SystmOne to the private healthcare sector across Qatar, including approximately 300 primary care sites.

In 2015, David Cameron visited the in-progress building site of new TPP head office. Cameron gave a speech saying, "What [TPP] is doing here is incredible… Companies like TPP keep the UK at the forefront of innovation… TPP is an example of a great British business with immense potential." In the same year TPP's founder, Frank Hester, received an OBE for his contribution to healthcare in the UK. From 2016 to the start of 2026, the company received £591m from public contracts. Outside of the health sector, the company works with prisons and the military.

In September 2023, The Guardian reported that payments totalling £137m since April 2020 from the Department of Health and Social Care were found in payment data that had not been published on the Government's official procurement website, Contracts Finder. In 2023, following a donation from TTP to the Conservative Party, the company was given a contract with the UK Health Security Agency without a competitive process. Shadow Health Minister Andrew Gwynne accused the Conservatives of engaging in cash for access and wrote to Health Secretary Steve Barclay asking for an explanation. Hester is the largest ever donor to the UK Conservative Party, having donated more than £20m over 2023 and 2024.

=== Data breaches ===
In 2017, the SystmOne was found to have serious compliance concerns by the Information Commissioner's Office (ICO). This affected 2,700 GP practices in the UK and a new data-sharing feature in the software.

Between March 2015 and June 2018, another breach due to the SystmOne software occurred affecting the data of 150,000 patients. This shared the data of patients who had made a type 2 opt-out (which meant they did not allow their data to be used for anything other than their own clinical care). TPP offered an unreserved apology for the breach. A statement to parliament regarding the breach was read out by health minister Jackie Doyle-Price and patients were informed by letter.

=== Founder controversies ===
In March 2024, The Guardian reported that Frank Hester had supposedly made several racist and misogynist comments. This includes in 2019 an abusive statement about the MP Diane Abbott, saying that Abbott "makes you want to hate all black women" and that she "should be shot". That same year, Hester allegedly called a meeting for "foreign" employees to defend himself following accusations of racist comments by former employees, saying in part, "I want to clear the air and make sure we all know where we are, what we stand for, and we take the piss out of the fact that all our Chinese girls sit together in Asian corner, which they do." A statement from The Phoenix Partnership said Hester abhorred racism and "accepts that he was rude about Diane Abbott in a private meeting several years ago but his criticism had nothing to do with her gender nor colour of skin."

On 14 March, as a result of Hester's alleged remarks, health workers' trade union, the British Medical Association (BMA), called upon Hester to resign from his company. The BMA's general practitioners' committee (GPC) voted in favour of an emergency motion that he had "contravened NHS England's fit and proper person test framework introduced in response to the 2019 Kark review recommendations." The co-chairs of the GPC general practitioners' committee said that the passing of the motion, "makes it clear how appalled GPs are". Christina McAnea, the general secretary of Unison, which represents half a million NHS workers, echoed the views of the doctors' body.

== Awards ==
- 2022 – HIMSS "Best Hospital IT solution 2022" for SystmOne, Airmid and Brigid.
