= Frank Hester =

British businessman (born 1966)

Frank Hester OBE
- Born: Francis Xavier James Hester; 1966 (age 59–60)
- Occupation: Businessman
- Title: Founder The Phoenix Partnership
- Spouse: Rosemary Daly (divorced)

Francis Xavier James Hester OBE (born April 1966) is a British businessman, and the founder of software company The Phoenix Partnership. He is the largest ever donor to the Conservative Party reportedly having given over £20 million since the beginning of 2023.

== Biography ==
Hester is of Irish descent and grew up in Armley, a district in the west of Leeds, West Yorkshire. Both of his parents immigrated from Ireland to the United Kingdom.

Hester is the sole owner of The Phoenix Partnership, which he founded in 1997 and specialises in providing healthcare technology. In the 2015 New Year Honours, he was appointed Officer of the Order of the British Empire (OBE) for services to healthcare. The Guardian reported that contracts worth £135m since April 2020 were awarded to his company by the Department of Health and Social Care, the majority for work under the GP IT Futures framework.

=== Political affiliations ===
In September 2023, Hester donated £5 million to the UK's Conservative Party, making him the joint biggest donor in two decades. These donations were made by his company TPP, but TPP said Hester personally repaid it, and that the company is apolitical. He made a second £5 million donation to the Conservatives through his company in November 2023, making Hester the largest ever donor to the party. It has been reported that he had donated a further £5 million in 2024, which the party neither confirmed nor denied, but was later verified after Electoral Commission records were published. Altogether in 2023 and 2024, Hester donated more than £20m to the Conservative Party.

He said he previously voted for the Green Party, but became a Conservative Party donor after coming to the view that prime minister Rishi Sunak "understands and values the NHS and wants to tackle some of its most pressing challenges". Sunak and Hester met on a number of occasions in 2023, and in November 2023 Hester provided the use of a helicopter to prime minister Rishi Sunak for a political visit, valued at £15,000 in parliamentary records.

=== Comments about Diane Abbott and others ===
In March 2024, The Guardian reported that Hester had made comments in a 2019 company meeting about the MP Diane Abbott. The paper reported that he said seeing Diane Abbott on television made him “want to hate all black women" and that she “should be shot", as well as making comments about a female executive from another organisation, saying "it would be much better if she died", and about his own Asian female employees, saying “we take the piss out of the fact that all our Chinese girls sit together in Asian corner”. BBC News also reported what The Guardian said, adding that they were unable to verify that the alleged remarks had been made. The Guardian also reported that Hester's lawyers had said "that Hester’s comments had been distorted and taken out of context, and were not a true or accurate characterisation of the company or Hester". A statement from The Phoenix Partnership said Hester "accepts that he was rude about Diane Abbott in a private meeting several years ago but his criticism had nothing to do with her gender nor colour of skin". The statement said Hester abhorred racism.

The prime minister's official spokesperson initially condemned the remarks but did not call them racist. Mel Stride, the Work and Pensions Secretary, said the comments about Abbott "were clearly inappropriate" but people should "move on" and such comments were not "race-based" and "had nothing to do with her gender nor colour of skin". Energy Minister Graham Stuart said while the remarks were "ridiculous" he would "hesitate" to call them racist. Many opposition politicians criticised Hester's reported comments and called such comments racist. The Business Secretary Kemi Badenoch and then the prime minister Rishi Sunak separately described Hester's alleged comments as "racist" although Sunak declined to return Hester's political donations. Abbott, who described the comments as "frightening", filed a complaint about the reported remarks to the Metropolitan Police's Parliamentary Liaison and Investigation Team. Hester said he had tried twice to apologise to her, by phone, once the comments were made public.

On 14 March, as a result of Hester's alleged remarks, health workers' trade union, the British Medical Association (BMA), called upon Hester to resign from his company TPP. The BMA's general practitioners' committee (GPC) voted in favour of an emergency motion that he had "contravened NHS England's fit and proper person test framework introduced in response to the 2019 Kark review recommendations." The co-chairs of the GPC general practitioners' committee said that the passing of the motion, "makes it clear how appalled GPs are". Christina McAnea, the general secretary of Unison, which represents half a million NHS workers, echoed the views of the doctors' body.

== Personal life ==
Hester was previously married to Dr Rosemary Daly, a former general practitioner; she was described as "now ex-wife" by The Guardian in 2024.

As of 2024, the Sunday Times Rich List estimated his net worth at £371 million.

In February 2026, Frank Hester was listed on the Sunday Times Tax list with an estimated £35.5 million.
