= Optimum Patient Care Research Database =

The Optimum Patient Care Research Database (OPCRD) is an electronic medical record database, containing high-quality, de-identified data from primary care medical records from across the UK. It has been used to support healthcare research by providing access to real-world data on chronic diseases, treatments, and patient outcomes. Widely used for epidemiological studies and improving clinical practice, the OPCRD helps advance evidence-based care and inform healthcare policy.

== Data ==
As of January, 2024, the data in the OPCRD is taken from over 1,100 general practices in the UK and includes 24 million unique de-identified, longitudinal patient lives. The data is supplemented by data from patient-reported questionnaires, including sub-registries with enhanced data from asthma, COPD, and COVID-19. Within the OPCRD, patients have a mean duration of 11.7 years’ follow-up, with a majority having key summary data from birth to last data entry.

OPCRD extracts from all major UK electronic health record (EHR) systems and all clinical coding schemes. The whole of the OPCRD is mapped to the OMOP common data model, which enables international real world evidence analysis. OPCRD is a member of the European Health Data and Evidence Network.

== History ==
The OPC Research Database was established in 2010 by David Price, Professor of Primary Care Respiratory Medicine at the University of Aberdeen. The database is held by Optimum Patient Care (OPC), a UK-based not-for-profit social enterprise. OPC's focus was initially on asthma and COPD, but the company has since expanded to include rare diseases and wider chronic medical conditions. The OPC Research Database contains data on almost all medical conditions recorded in primary care.

== Information Collected by OPCRD ==
All data collected are pseudonymised at the site of the contributing GP practices using secure extraction software installed on-site at the practices. No direct patient-identifiable or sensitive information is collected or leaves a GP practice, unless agreed otherwise for the purpose of secondary care linkage. Patients who have withdrawn from data sharing via their GP or via the national data opt-out scheme in England are not extracted by OPCRD and are thus not available for research.

The following are among the data collected within OPCRD:

- Deidentified longitudinal patient-level data.
- Demographic information.
- Treatments and prescriptions.
- Test results and measurements.
- Laboratory results.
- Diagnoses.
- Symptoms.
- Referrals.
- Coded data (Read/SNOMED codes) and OMOP mapped.
- Sub-registries with enhanced data from asthma, COPD, and COVID-19.
- A subset of high-quality data on biologic prescribing.
- Coding of free text prescribing instructions.

OPCRD also has the ability to enhance data for specific needs, support clinical trial recruitment, and collect real-life endpoints for clinical trials.

== Standards and Accreditations ==
The Optimum Patient Care Research Database is a member of HDR UK, and has received approval from the NHS Health Research Authority Research Ethics Committee. Access to the OPCRD is governed by an independent third-party approval committee (ADEPT) who ensure research on the database is ethical and done with scientific rigour.^{23} Access to the OPCRD is available for ethically approved research studies only, is subject to entering into strict and limited data sharing agreements, with access provided through a trusted research environment.

The OPCRD is held and maintained by Optimum Patient Care, a not-for-profit social enterprise that offers a wide range of clinical trials services and quality improvement evaluations to GP practices and other clients in the UK.

== Studies and Publications ==
OPCRD is regularly used in clinical, epidemiological, and pharmaceutical research. The dataset has been used for Quality Improvement projects and research in chronic diseases including, but not limited to, COVID-19, COPD, asthma, and cardiovascular disease. To date, over 110 publications have used data from the OPC Research Database, which are outlined on the OPC website.

== See also ==
- Clinical Practice Research Datalink
- The Health Improvement Network
