= St Charles' Hospital =

- Central London Community Healthcare NHS Trust
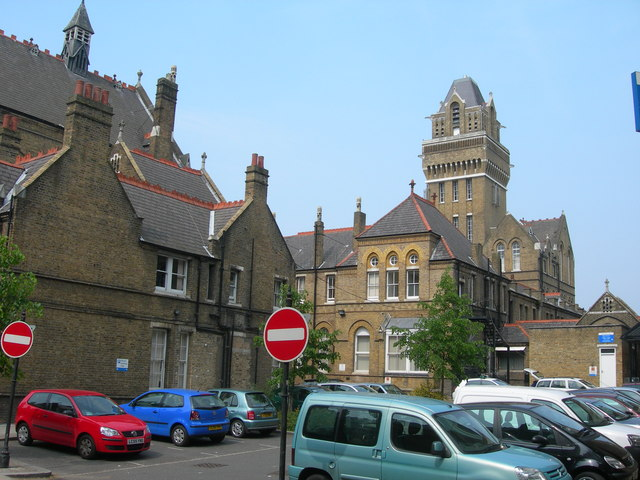
- St Charles' Hospital

- Location within Kensington and Chelsea

Geography
- Location: Exmoor Street, North Kensington, London W10 6DZ
- Coordinates: 51.5221°N 0.2176°W

Organisation
- Care system: NHS England
- Type: Specialist

Services
- Speciality: Care for the elderly

History
- Founded: 1879; 147 years ago

St Charles' Hospital is a health facility in North Kensington, London. It is managed by the Central London Community Healthcare NHS Trust.

== History ==
The foundation stone for the hospital was laid in 1879 and it was officially opened by the Prince and Princess of Wales as the St Marylebone Union Infirmary in 1881. A nurses' home was opened by Princess Christian in 1884. The facility became the St Marylebone Hospital in 1923 and was renamed St Charles' Hospital in 1930 when it was taken over by the London County Council.

Nurses' badges

At the time of transfer to the London County Council the hospital had 756 beds. The medical superintendent was Basil Hood MRCS LRCP (London), there were 3 other medical staff. The hospital steward was HG Cummings. The Matron was Miss SG Cockrell RRC (Royal Red Cross) 1st Class. Matron Cockrell trained at St Charles when it was known as St Marylebone Infirmary in1898. Matron Cockrell served in the Territorial Army Nursing service and was awarded the Royal Red Cross in 1919 for her services in France during the First World War.

St Charles Hospital joined the National Health Service in 1948 and continues to operate as the St Charles Centre for Health and Wellbeing.

The main building is listed with Grade II.

== Notable staff ==
- Caroline Nompozola, house surgeon.
