= Caroline Nompozolo =

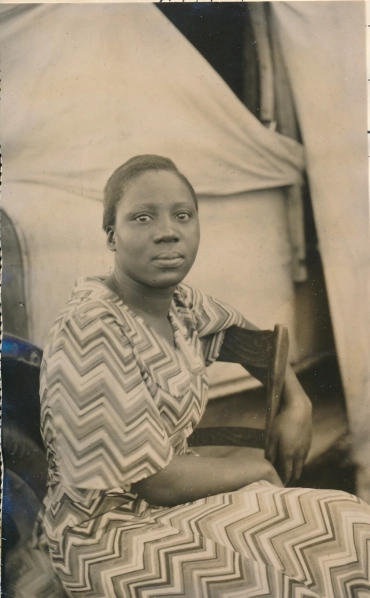
- Born: 17 August 1916; South Africa
- Died: April 7, 2008 (aged 91); Bridgewater, Somerset, England
- Education: Healdtown High School; School of Medicine of the Scottish Medical Royal Colleges
- Occupation: Physician

Caroline Nompozolo (17 August 1916 - 7 April 2008) was the first native South African woman to qualify as a physician. She studied medicine at the School of Medicine of the Scottish Medical Royal Colleges and was later house surgeon at St Charles' Hospital.

== Early education ==
She was educated at Healdtown High School in Eastern Cape Province, where Nelson Mandela was later a pupil from 1937. She went on to study science at South African Native College, Fort Hare in Alice in the Eastern Cape. The South African Native College, later the University of Fort Hare, was founded in 1916 on the site of a former British military garrison. The College offered European-style higher education; alumni include Nelson Mandela, Oliver Tambo and Robert Mugabe. Nompozola's ambition, however, had always been to study medicine. In 1937, after completing the first year of science course, she applied to the University of St Andrews in Scotland to study medicine, but was rejected as the university did not recognise the South African Native College. Her examination passes were however recognised by the School of Medicine of the Scottish Medical Royal Colleges, to which she successfully applied to study medicine. As the first black women to do this her story was reported in the press."Before she sailed for Europe she was met at nearly every railway station by teachers, journalists and clergymen who wished her Godspeed".

== Medical education ==
The Principal of the School of Medicine, Professor John Orr, accepted her application and arranged for her to be admitted as a medical student to Anderson's College, Glasgow, where she studied anatomy and physiology, with further classes then taken at St Mungo's College, Glasgow, both part of the extramural school. Her clinical training was carried out at Glasgow Royal Infirmary and the Western Infirmary, the two main Glasgow teaching hospitals.

She qualified as a doctor with the Triple Qualification in 1942.

== Medical career ==
She received funding to travel to Dublin for postgraduate courses in midwifery and paediatrics.

In 1953 she was a house surgeon at the St Charles Hospital in West London.

She died in Bridgewater, Somerset, England on 7 April 2008.
