= The Health Improvement Network =

The Health Improvement Network (THIN) is a large database of anonymised electronic medical records collected at primary care clinics throughout the UK. The THIN database is owned and managed by The Health Improvement Network Ltd in collaboration with In Practice Systems Ltd.

The Health Improvement Network Ltd & In Practice Systems Ltd are both subsidiary companies of Cegedim SA

== History ==
The THIN database is similar in structure and content to the Clinical Practice Research Datalink (CPRD, previously known as GPRD), which is now managed by the United Kingdom Medicines and Healthcare products Regulatory Agency (MHRA).

Between 1994 and 2002, EPIC (UK), a not-for-profit company, held a non-exclusive licence to use GPRD for research benefitting public health. On the expiry of that licence, THIN was developed by EPIC as an alternative to the GPRD, and a substantial number of primary care practitioners now contribute data to both resources. In 2005 EPIC was acquired by Cegedim, a global technology and services company specialising in the healthcare field.

THIN data are made available under more permissive terms than other similar resources (such as the CPRD, which does not allow for-profit use by private companies), but access is subject to ethical approval by an independent Scientific Review Committee.

== Data ==
Data collection commenced in January 2003, using information extracted from VISION a widely used general practice management software package developed by In Practice Systems Ltd a company also owned by Cegedim SA.

The database is regularly updated and currently contains data on over 10 million individuals living in the United Kingdom.

Clinical data in THIN are catalogued using Read codes, a comprehensive and searchable classification scheme for medical conditions, symptoms and important background information. This system is complemented by a set of Additional Health Data (AHD) codes which provide a standardised system for the recording of a wide variety of clinical measurements, and by drug codes which identify prescribed medications.

Since 2004, the UK Quality and Outcomes Framework, a performance-related pay scheme for primary care practitioners, has effectively mandated the use of computer systems (such as Vision) to maintain patient medical records, and has imposed standardised recording methods for a wide range of important medical conditions. In addition, practitioners contributing data to THIN receive training to ensure consistent recording of important clinical outcomes and indicators including:

- Asthma
- Coronary heart disease
- Diabetes mellitus
- Epilepsy
- Menopause
- Hypertension
- Hypothyroidism
- Leg ulcers
- Heart failure
- Warfarin use
- Lithium use
- Use of hormonal contraception
- Pernicious anaemia
- Rheumatoid arthritis
- Secondary stroke prevention
- Lower back pain
- Mental health
- Smoking status

THIN is an important resource in the fields of epidemiology, drug safety and health outcomes research, providing an inexpensive means to study the causes of disease and effectiveness of interventions in a large, representative population.

== See also ==
- Optimum Patient Care Research Database (OPCRD)
- Clinical Practice Research Datalink
