= EMIS Health =

British medical software company

EMIS Health, formerly known as Egton Medical Information Systems, supplies electronic patient record systems and software used in primary care, acute care and community pharmacy in the United Kingdom. The company is based in Leeds. It claims that more than half of GP practices across the UK use EMIS Health software and holds number one or two market positions in its main markets. In June 2022 the company was acquired by Bordeaux UK Holdings II Limited, an affiliate of UnitedHealth's Optum business for a 49% premium on EMIS's closing share price. EMIS rebranded to Optum on 17 March 2025; software products, such as 'EMIS Web', retain the EMIS name.

In September 2026 the company will rebrand to Enliviohealth.

== Competitors ==
The other approved GP systems for many years were SystmOne, Microtest Health and Vision. However, Microtest Health ceased providing their Evolution clinical software to GP practices in England around 2021. In Practice Systems saw all of their English provision of their Vision clinical software move to either EMIS or SystmOne, leaving Wales, Northern Ireland and Scotland as their remaining territories. Vision has since been replaced by EMIS Web in both Wales and Northern Ireland, which is now the single clinical software system in use by both parts of the UK. In England EMIS and SystmOne have a duopoly. The pair were paid £77 million for primary care software in 2018.

== EMIS Group ==
EMIS Group, which includes Egton Medical Information Systems Limited, also comprises:

- Ascribe, rebranded to EMIS Health, a provider of software and IT services to secondary care, sold to EMIS Group by ECI Partners in 2013;
- Rx Systems, rebranded to EMIS Health, whose software is used by 37% of community pharmacies in the UK;
- Egton, who provides IT infrastructure, engineering and support.
- Patient UK, used by 10 million people globally each month for health information and described as "The top health website you can't live without" by The Times.
- Dovetail Lab, purchased in 2018, a health technology company developing blockchain software to facilitate the integration of healthcare data.
- Pinnacle Health Partnership LLP / Pinnacle Systems Management Ltd, owners and operators of the widely used PharmOutcomes platform

The company bought Pinbellcom Group which supplies administration and compliance software to both the primary and the secondary care markets in July 2015, now a part of Egton.

== Healthcare record systems ==
EMIS is one of the suppliers approved by the GP Systems of Choice and so funded by the NHS. Through its Patient Access service, EMIS was the first clinical system providers to enable patients to book GP appointments online and order repeat prescriptions. Patient Access also enables patients to access their own records online. EMIS Web had been rolled out to 3,750 practices in September 2014.

EMIS Web allows primary, secondary and community healthcare practitioners to view and contribute to a patient's electronic healthcare record. Failures to link up medical records held by hospitals and those kept by their family doctors put patient's lives at risk, according to Prof Steve Field of the Care Quality Commission. He says this could be tackled by giving patients access to their own records – a system pioneered using EMIS software, in an attempt to restore patient confidence, by Dr Amir Hannan when he took over Harold Shipman's practice. "He's got examples of patients being admitted to hospital where they have had to show the consultants their record, which may have saved their lives. It's policy to try and make it happen. But it's not moving quickly enough." EMIS was the first provider of GP record systems to permit Patient record access. EMIS said that the numbers of practices providing patients with online access to their records 'shot up' after it allowed GPs to tailor the parts of the record that patients can see. Dr Shaun O'Hanlon, EMIS's Chief Medical Officer says that the legal framework around data sharing is the main problem in integrating patient data because the Data Protection Act 1998 puts responsibilities on GPs to protect the confidentiality of patient data, but at the same time they have a "duty to share" when it is in the best interests of the patient. He says the quickest, easiest route to large scale record sharing is to put patients in the driving seat using smartphone technology. He quotes a YouGov poll which found that 85% of the population wanted any medical professional directly responsible for their treatment to have secure electronic access to key data from their GP record, such as long term conditions, medication history or allergies. EMIS Web supports Summary Care Records.

Royal Free London NHS Foundation Trust has access to patients' GP records in the Urgent Care Centre run by Haverstock Healthcare in its A&E department using the EMIS Web integrated clinical IT system. This enables the majority of patients to be sent home with written information on self-care or referred to a pharmacy.

In March 2015 the company made an agreement to share patient data with SystmOne the second-biggest supplier of GP software after IMS MAXIMS released an open source version of its software, which acute trusts can use and alter the code to tailor the system to their needs. The companies say they hope to deliver functionality to support cross-organisational working, such as shared tasks and shared appointment booking. This agreement is independent of the medical interoperability gateway.

Patient information is integrated with the record systems, so patients can manage their own care with an information library, health apps, online and mobile services such as GP appointment booking and repeat prescription ordering.

Ascribe is a supplier of clinical record systems for hospital pharmacy, A&E, mental health and patient administration (PAS)/electronic patient record systems (EPR). Seventy per cent of NHS secondary care organisations use an Ascribe solution.

Tracey Grainger, Head of Digital Primary Care Development at NHS England, who manages the Prime Minister's Challenge Fund in July 2015 asked the company for assistance in obtaining "extracts of de-identified patient level data from systems that either record appointments or record consultations or in some cases both" on a monthly basis back to April 2013. This included the postcode sector of the patient, the date, time and duration of appointments as well as the reason for the consultation.

The company is working with Central London Community Healthcare NHS Trust and Waltham Forest Clinical Commissioning Group on two pilots that will allow users of its software to see patient records on TPP's SystmOne and vice versa without any external software.

== Pharmacy ==
RX Systems, now EMIS Health, is a supplier of software to pharmacists. The ProScript and ProScript Connect software systems are community pharmacy dispensary management systems, managing the dispensary process, labelling and endorsing patient records, ordering and stock control. In February 2018 the company piloted EMIS Web for Pharmacy, which enabled community pharmacists to read and write to the GP patient record and to see a full history of medication and diagnostic results.
