= Central London Community Healthcare NHS Trust =

British healthcare trust

- Type: NHS trust
- Established: 1 November 2010
- Headquarters: 15 Marylebone Road; London; NW1 5JD
- Chair: Tom Kibasi
- Chief executive: James Benson
- Staff: 5,000+
- Website: clch.nhs.uk

Central London Community Healthcare NHS Trust is a NHS trust which provides community health services to a number of London boroughs, as well as Hertfordshire.

== History ==
In 2009, the community service parts of Hammersmith and Fulham, Kensington and Chelsea, and Westminster primary care trusts merged, as part of the Transforming Community Services initiative. This combined organisation was established as an NHS trust on 1 November 2010. The organisation merged with Barnet Community Services on 1 April 2011.

It has a back-office support contract with Capita for IT, estates and facilities management services.

It ran the Soho Square and Milne House general practices in Westminster but abandoned the loss-making contracts in July 2014.

It was named by the Health Service Journal as one of the top hundred NHS trusts to work for in 2015. At that time it had 2577 full-time equivalent staff and a sickness absence rate of 4.04%. 64% of staff recommend it as a place for treatment and 53% recommended it as a place to work.

In April 2016 it took over community service for Merton CCG practices. In October 2017 the trust took over the contract for community services in Wandsworth, worth £51.6 million from St George's University Hospitals NHS Foundation Trust.

== Services ==
It runs an 18-bed 'intermediate care' ward at Charing Cross Hospital in partnership with Imperial College Healthcare NHS Trust.

It runs the St Charles' Centre for Health and Wellbeing on the site of St Charles' Hospital in Ladbroke Grove. The site is also used by Central and North West London NHS Foundation Trust, which provides mental health services there.

In August 2022 it started using the DrDoctor care co-ordination platform, integrated with EMIS Web, to let patients to choose when they attend appointments.

== See also ==
- List of NHS trusts
