= Application site reaction =

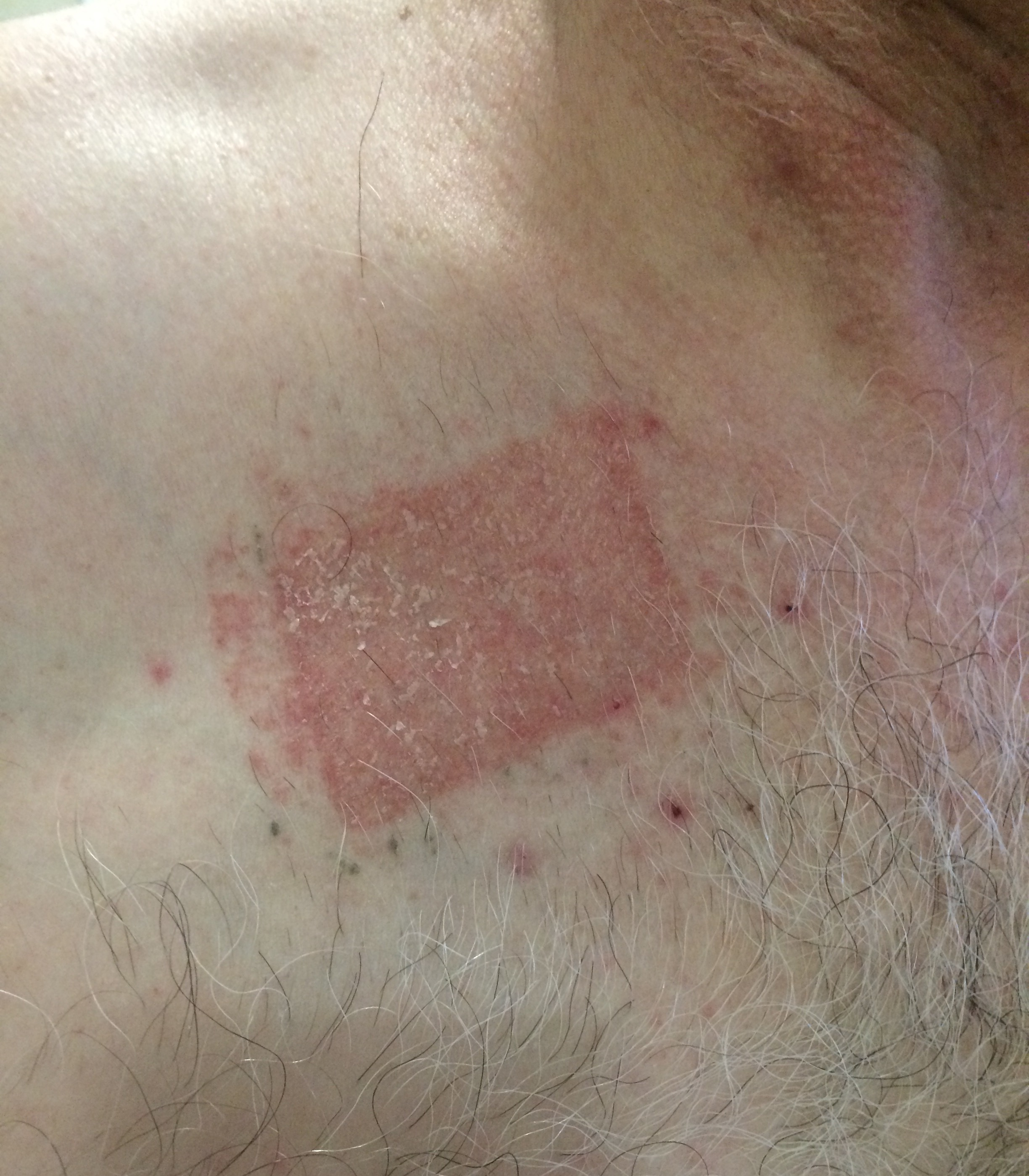
- 52-year-old male patient with severe contact dermatitis and severe pain at the application site of a 15mcg/hr buprenorphine transdermal (Norspan) patch.
- Specialty: Dermatology

Application site reactions are reactions to medical treatments which occur at the site of application. An example is skin reactions to transdermal patches.

These reactions may be caused by:

- Irritant (non-allergic) reactions — the most common type, caused by direct skin irritation from adhesives, solvents, or the drug itself..
- Allergic reactions — usually allergic contact dermatitis, a delayed hypersensitivity immune response to an allergen such as patch adhesive, excipients, or the active drug.
- Mechanical forces

Some application site reactions are neither allergic nor irritant in immunologic terms, but result from friction, occlusion, pressure, or repeated removal trauma.

- Local inflammatory injection unrelated to allergy

Implants may trigger localized redness, swelling, pain, or induration due to nonspecific inflammation rather than allergy.

== See also ==
- Injection site reaction
- Skin lesion
- List of cutaneous conditions
