= Amir Hannan =

English physician

Amir Simon Hannan is an English doctor who works as a general practitioner in Tameside and has pioneered patients having access and understanding to their Electronic health records in the English National Health Service.

He grew up in a family of doctors – his mother was a gynaecologist who later became a GP.

Amir is Chair of West Pennine Local Medical Committee and Chair of the Association of Greater Manchester Local Medical Committees.

He is also Chair of the World Health Innovation Summit.

== General practice ==
He joined Haughton Thornley Medical Centres in Hyde and Haughton Green in 2000 after it took over the Market Street practice which was formerly run by Dr Harold Shipman when he started his career. The practice is in a deprived neighbourhood with a large Bengali population. He saw giving patients access to their GP electronic health records and gaining a better understanding of their health and healthcare needs as a way of rebuilding trust in a difficult situation. He told the BBC: "The week before I started there was a sit-down protest in the waiting room, because the patients were not happy about this doctor that was being foisted on them. That gives you some idea of the battlefield I was walking into". 150 patients at the practice were given access to their medical records and test results over the internet in 2007. Prof Steve Field of the Care Quality Commission recounted: “It was very difficult to recruit to Shipman’s practice because of [the lack of] trust locally. But Amir said, ‘Right from the start I will share everything with my patients, and gave them access to all their own records. He’s got examples of patients being admitted to hospital where they have had to show the consultants their record which may have saved their lives. It’s policy to try and make it happen. But it’s not moving quickly enough.” As of May 2015, 34% of the patient population were accessing to their GP record. There was no difference between the proportion of Bengali patients doing so and the rest of the practice population. By December 2020, 10,000 patients (76% of the patient population) had full access to their GP electronic health records and a better understanding of their healthcare needs.

He was one of the GPs who signed a letter to Liz Truss in 2022 urging more investment in primary care where they said surgeries were sinking under the weight of demand leading to wider health inequalities.

== Record access ==
He was one of the first GPs pioneering Patient record access using EMIS software. He says "there are some doctors and nurses who have genuine concerns about patients suddenly being let loose to access their records without any controls in place or without clinicians having to do anything and a feeling of irresponsibility that that raises." Jacqui Gladwin, a nursing lecturer who is one of his patients, was worried about online access. She asked:"What happens if patients see information that is incorrect? How safe is the system? What happens if they see something distressing when the surgery is closed?" She was surprised to find that other patients in the practice did not share her worries. At a meeting at the practice to discuss the development of records access, several patients had found errors in their records. They were positive about being able to identify errors and the response they had received when they reported them. They felt trusted to own the information, and secure when travelling abroad that they could allow other health professionals to access their medical information.

He speaks regularly about the benefits of giving patients access to their full GP electronic health records, and about how this works at his practice. And in 2008 he authored the Patient Access to Medical Records pattern of the Liberating Voices pattern language.

Research in which Hannan participated showed that practices who give at least a third of their patients full online access to their records could experience a decrease in appointment demand of up to 12%. Dr Brian Fisher, one of the other participants in the study conceded that as the practices concerned were leaders in their field with regard to offering online access to medical records, it could be difficult to extrapolate the results.

He has defended the government's Summary Care Record project, which has been criticised by other GPs on the grounds of cost. Each time an SCR was accessed for a patient in 2012 it cost £1,200. He says "The SCR isn’t a panacea, it’s just one solution". He was, however, critical of the care.data fiasco, saying "If patients felt that their data was leaking out, and I had not warned them about it, then that would destroy my relationship with them."

He was ranked in the Health Service Journal's list of Clinical Leaders in 2015. He was awarded an MBE in the 2021 New Year Honours.
