= Patient UK =

Website providing medical information

Patient
- Industry: Medicine and Healthcare
- Founded: 1996
- Headquarters: Leeds, United Kingdom,
- Area served: United Kingdom (Patient Access); Worldwide (Patient.info)
- Owner: Navigate Health
- Website: patient.info

Patient is a subsidiary of Navigate Health. First launching in 1996 as a directory of UK websites providing health related information, the company now provides digital healthcare products to the public in the form of Patient.info.

== Patient.info ==
Patient.info is an online resource providing information on health, lifestyle, disease and other medical related topics. The website's aim is to provide members of the public with up-to-date information on health related topics in the form of comprehensive leaflets (which can be read online or printed), blogs, wellbeing advice and videos. Leaflets are compiled and reviewed by qualified medical practitioners with several years of experience in the medical profession. Users also have access to a symptom checker where they may attempt to self-diagnose any health condition they may have. As well as these resources, there is also a community forum to discuss any health topics with other users of the website, however healthcare professionals do not actively review this section.

Another section of the website contains articles and content geared towards medical professionals. These professional articles are typically written in a more technical manner, going into more specific detail and using more industry-specific language and jargon.

There is also a paid-for service called Patient Pro, where users may pay a monthly subscription fee in order to gain access to enhanced site capability.

Information on Patient.info is updated to keep abreast of the latest medical evidence, with each leaflet reviewed every two years or earlier when necessary (whichever comes first).

In 2013, the site appeared in a "Top 50 websites" feature published in The Times.

In 2025, the site was acquired by Navigate Health.

In June 2025,Which named Patient.info as one of the trusted health websites that GPs recommend. The independent consumer champion said: "if you want to find out more info about a condition or check health symptoms, Patient.info is one of the trusted sources of medical info the GPs we spoke to recommend.Patient.info is a comprehensive site which offers user-friendly advice and information on conditions, medications, and procedures - all approved by clinicians."

== Awards ==
Patient claims to have won several awards for its content over several years from different award bodies.

- Which Joint Top Health Website - November 2010
- BMA Highly Commended Resource Award - BMA Patient Information Awards 2012
- The Times Top Health Website - January 2013
- Website of the Year Awards 2014 - Best Health Website - November 2014
- Medilink Yorkshire and Humber Healthcare Business Awards 2013 - Harrison Goddard Innovation Award for Patient Access app - March 2014
