= Patient record access in the United Kingdom =

Patient record access in the United Kingdom has developed most fully in respect of the GP record, because computerisation in that field is almost universal. British hospitals were slower to move into electronic records. From 1 April 2015 all GP practices in England have to provide online services to patients, including access to summary electronic medical records.

== Legislation ==
The Access to Medical Reports Act 1988 gave patients the right to see any medical report relating to them "which is to be, or has been, supplied by a medical practitioner for employment purposes or insurance purposes". The Access to Health Records Act 1990 gave them the right to inspect their own records. The Data Protection Act 1998 and the Data Protection Act 2018 apply to medical records as to other records.

Only 3% of GPs in England offered online record access in October 2014 to patients although all of them were expected to by April 2015. EMIS said that the numbers of practices providing patients with online access to their records ‘shot up’ after it allowed GPs to tailor the parts of the record that patients can see. GPs are required from 2015 only to offer patients online access to the medication, allergies and adverse reactions in their summary care record, not to the complete record. Jeremy Hunt announced in September 2015 that all patients will be entitled to read and write to all their NHS health records online by 2018.

== Development ==
Failures to link up medical records held by hospitals and those kept by their family doctors put patient's lives at risk, according to Prof Steve Field of the Care Quality Commission. He says this could be tackled by giving patients access to their own records – a system pioneered, in an attempt to restore patient confidence, by Dr Amir Hannan. Hannan faced a difficult problem when he took over the GP practice formerly held by Dr Harold Shipman, who had murdered several hundred patients. “It was very difficult to recruit to Shipman’s practice because of [the lack of] trust locally. But Amir said, ‘Right from the start I will share everything with my patients, and gave them access to all their own records." "He's got examples of patients being admitted to hospital where they have had to show the consultants their record which may have saved their lives. It's policy to try and make it happen. But it's not moving quickly enough.”

150 patients at the practice were given access to their medical records and test results over the internet in 2007 using a system run by Emis. They could go online to order prescriptions, communicate with their GP or even to print off their medical records to take to appointments with hospital consultants. As of October 2014 the practice had enabled over 3,200 patients - 28% of its total patient population - to have electronic access to their GP record. This level of access has been shown to cut down on appointments by as much as 12% and the number of phone calls made to practices.

Ingrid Brindle, a patient at Hannan's practice, has had online access to her record for over eight years. She said having access to her record was ‘invaluable’ and allowed her and her GP to work together as a ‘team’. ‘The amount of time I don't have to contact the practice is incredible,’ she told GPs at a King’s Fund event. ‘I really don't understand why so little progress has been made. Empowering patients and giving them control over their situation so that they understand when they're making their health choices, to me it's a no-brainer.’

The NHS England National Information Board produced a document Personalised Health and Care 2020, in November 2014 outlining plans for patients to be able to add comments into their care records from March 2018 and for NHS regulators to take action against trusts failing to hit new technology targets. It was enthusiastically supported by Lord Darzi who argued that interested patients and carers, especially those accustomed to self-management of their condition, should take the lead in creating apps and other means of accessing records that are customised to the needs of patient groups.

Progress has been slow and patchy. Hannan says "If we set a target like 2018 for things to happen, then it will be 2025 before they do.” Professor Chris Ham says: “On the one hand there is a great deal of innovation out there, but we are too dependent on the work of Dr Hannan and others. There is also too much variation, something great can be going on in one area but it can be a completely different story just down the road.”

== Scotland ==
As part of the Scottish Government's 2020 Vision for Health and Social Care, all patients will be given online access to their own health records by 2020.

== Impact ==
Sharing their electronic health records with people who have type 2 diabetes helps them to reduce their blood sugar levels. It is a way of helping people understand their own health condition and involving them actively in its management.

== Care.data ==
Dr Hannan has dealt with the Care.data controversy by placing detailed information and an opt-out form of the practice website about the care.data scheme linked to various information sources including the practice’s understanding, not just the official information provided by NHS England. The practice has had 372 patients opt out using this tool in one week.

== Community Services ==
Both patients and staff of Locala Community Partnerships can use Microsoft Lync. This can be used to offer the patient a virtual assessment. Patients can access Lync through an emailed hyperlink and a clinician can then assess the symptom via video call, reducing the time taken out of the patient’s day.

== Hospital records ==
A system developed for renal patients, Renal PatientView, provides online information for kidney patients’ including diagnoses, treatment and latest test results. Almost all renal units in the UK can use this system, and it has been extended to patients with inflammatory bowel disease and diabetes in Salford Royal NHS Foundation Trust. The Scottish Government is funding a pilot for patients with heart failure.

== Opt-out ==
A system for patients to opt out of sharing their personal health data beyond direct care was launched by NHS Digital in 2018 as a response to the care.data fiasco, but by 1 October, only 2,185 people had used it. MedConfidential complained that there had been little publicity for this scheme.

In 2022 the ‘Citizen’s Access Programme’ – giving patients in England automatic access to their prospective GP records through the NHS app was supposed to have been implemented on 1 November, but was delayed, and generated resistance from GPs with concerns about extra workload and distress for patients.

== Research ==
Research funded by the UK's National Institute for Health and Care Research (NIHR) suggests that giving nurses and pharmacists easier access to electronic patient records about prescribing could help people manage their symptoms at home.

== Security ==
There have been IT system failures across primary and secondary care. Guy's and St Thomas' NHS Foundation Trust stopped working for 10 days in 2022. The Northern Care Alliance NHS Foundation Trust IT failure caused weeks of problems. About 1,000 appointments and procedures were cancelled and the cost of ‘managing and recovering’ from the impact was estimated at £675,000. These failures block access to records, preventing clinicians from ordering investigations, restricting service provision, and bringing much healthcare to a halt. These failures are attributed to a lack of attention to NHS IT infrastructure - computers, servers, and networks, and the supporting processes and staff which ensure usability, stability, and security. According to the British Medical Association 27% of NHS clinicians lose more than four hours a week because of inefficient IT systems.

== See also ==
- Solid health
- Patient Online
