= In Practice Systems Limited =

- Formerly: Ranchalley Ltd., Value Added Medical Products Ltd, Reuters Health Information Ltd
- Industry: Health informatics
- Founded: 1984
- Headquarters: United Kingdom
- Parent: Cegedim

In Practice Systems Limited (INPS) is a health informatics company, part of the Cegedim group and based in the United Kingdom.

== Company history ==
The company was established in 1984 under the name of Ranchalley Ltd. It quickly changed its name to Value Added Medical Products Ltd (VAMP) and then to Reuters Health Information Ltd in 1997. In 1998 INPS was acquired by the Cegedim group. In 2004, the company purchased the UK arm of NDCHealth, makers of Pharmacy Manager software that was widely used across the UK. It later rebranded as Vision.

In 1990 VAMP was one of the four most popular GP computer systems in Wales. In 2010, INPS had about 20% of the English market, 30% of the market in Scotland and Northern Ireland and just over 50% of the market in Wales.

On 10 December 2024 In Practice Systems Limited was voluntarily placed into administration by the Cegedim group.

== Products ==
- Vision 3, a clinical system used within primary care settings
- Vision Online Services, a Web-based patient-centric service
- Outcomes Manager, a population health solution for local healthcare communities.

== England ==
In 2018, the GP IT Futures framework was announced as a new way to support modularity in healthcare systems in England and so make it easier for new suppliers to enter the market. Before this, INPS had produced one of the computer systems available to GPs in England under the Systems of Choice scheme from 2008, as well as through Local Service Provider, the CSC. Like other GP systems it made extensive use of Read codes. The other approved GP systems are SystmOne, EMIS Health and Microtest Health.

From April 2014 practices were contractually required to promote and offer patients the opportunity to book appointments online, order repeat prescriptions online and gain access to their medical records online.

The system hosts pathway management systems which automate the processes of monitoring patients, for example those taking disease-modifying antirheumatic drugs which are potentially toxic.

== Wales ==
In 2018, along with Microtest Health, it was awarded a four-year contract for GP clinical systems by the NHS Wales Informatics Service. This came after EMIS was excluded because its bid failed to 'meet a number of the necessary evaluation criteria relating to financial, contractual and functional requirements', according to NHS Wales. INPS Vision was already established in Wales, but Microtest was not.
