= Cegedim =

French health technology company

- Traded as: CAC Small
- ISIN: FR0000053506
- Industry: data processing, hosting and related activities
- Headquarters: France
- Website: cegedim.com

Cegedim SA is a health technology company based in Boulogne-Billancourt, founded in 1969. It employs more than 6,500 people in more than 10 countries. Revenue in 2025 was €649.2 million.

== Overview ==
The American subsidiary, Cegedim Inc., is based in Bedminster, New Jersey and has 2500 employees. It was formerly known as Dendrite International Inc. Founded in 1986, it changed its name in 2007.

Several Cegedim companies have been established in Romania since 2001: Cegedim Customer Information, a research and services company for pharma industry, Cegedim Rx, a software and services company for medical ambulatory assistance and the Cegedim Service Center.

It owns Cegedim Rx, which supplies pharmacy software (from the takeover of John Richardson Computers and NDC Health in 2004) and In Practice Systems Limited, which supplies primary care software.

Cegedim Rx supplies its Pharmacy Manager software to around 2,500 independent and regional and chain pharmacies in the UK. The Electronic Prescribing System crashed several times in June 2016, said to be the result of flooding in the London area where its data centre is based.

Cegedim Insurance Solutions provides software and services across healthcare systems.

In January 2021, Maiia, a startup subsidiary of the group, is one of the three companies chosen by the French Ministry of Health to manage online medical appointments and teleconsultations during the launch of the vaccination campaign against Covid-19, after it boomed in February 2020, just before the pandemic lockdown.

It acquired NetEDI Ltd, the leading UK provider of PEPPOL for the NHS Supply Chain, in 2019, and changed its name to Cegedim e-business in 2022.

It acquired Clinityx, a French firm with expertise in real-world data, notably in secured health data warehouses and linking them with SNDS, the French administrative healthcare database in October 2022.
