= Clinical Practice Research Datalink =

Healthcare research service in London, England

The Clinical Practice Research Datalink (CPRD) is an observational and interventional research service that operates as part of the Department of Health and Social Care. It is jointly funded by the National Institute for Health and Care Research (NIHR) and the Medicines and Healthcare products Regulatory Agency (MHRA). CPRD is working closely with the extensive primary care, topic specific and comprehensive NIHR research networks and with NHS Digital.

== History ==
=== Value Added Information Medical Products ===
The programme that would develop into the current organisation was initially developed by an Essex general practitioner, Dr Alan Dean, to facilitate day-to-day management of his own general practice, in collaboration with IT staff at the BATA shoe factory in East Tilbury near to his practice. Early programmers included a Czech programmer Jan Boda. In 1987 a venture capital company was set up, named Value Added Information Medical Products Ltd (VAMP) to recruit other practices and form an information base. The early development team of three, Marcella Devenish (formerly a midwife), Philip Lee-Warren (formerly a Senior Medical Laboratory Scientific Officer), under the leadership of Kieran O'Mally, developed further the computerised system using the BOS Microcobol development environment. During this period the number of UK practices using the software product IGP (Integrated General Practice) expanded from a few hundred to over two and a half thousand. In return for anonymous Healthcare data, VAMP Ltd offered GPs the cash equivalent of GBP 500 a month in order to build the VAMP research databank for research purposes. As of 1988, the VAMP research databank comprised 57 practices and 543,100 patients. This figure was doubled to 1.2 million in 1990. One year later, 970 practices allowed VAMP to access their data, while about 1000 practices had a straightforward maintenance agreement with VAMP.

=== General Practice Research Database ===
In November 1993, its parent company was acquired by Reuters Health Information, which donated the database to the Department of Health in 1994, at which time it became General Practice Research Database (GPRD) and contained data from 650 practices (4.4 million active patients). At this time, there were two licensees of the data: Dr Alan Dean, and Professor Hershel Jick. Then the database was operated by the Office for National Statistics until 1999, at which point the Medicines Control Agency (MCA) took over. This agency became the Medicines and Healthcare products Regulatory Agency (MHRA) on 1 April 2003 following a merger with the Medical Devices Agency (MDA). Since then, use of the database has expanded within the UK and overseas. The GPRD was run as a sub-division of the MHRA.

Following initiatives by the Director, Dr John Parkinson, the utility of GPRD was dramatically enhanced by linkage to other datasets on an individual patient level. External datasets included the Hospital Episode Statistics, death certificates, the national cancer registry and MINAP (cardiovascular disease) registry. Additionally the dataset became that of choice by the FDA and most major pharma companies.

=== Launch of the CPRD ===
In March 2011, The Government launched its 'Plan for Growth' which details steps needed to enable the British economy to become more internationally competitive. As part of this initiative The Government pledged to build a consensus on using e-health record data to create a unique position for the UK in health research.

— Department of Health

Following the announcement by the chancellor on the "Plan for Growth", a commissioned study entitled the "Research Capability Programme" was initiated with the aim of assessing the available research capabilities of the UK and future potential growth areas in this sector. An opportunity was identified for the collaboration of the Department of Health and the MHRA in creating a joint research service, based upon consolidating and expanding existing independent services. The new service, known as the CPRD has been developed to meet the expectations and criteria outlined by the "Plan for Growth".

On 29 March 2012, the Medicines and Healthcare products Regulatory Agency and the Department of Health's National Institute for Health and Care Research (NIHR) launched the Clinical Practice Research Datalink (CPRD). On the launch of CPRD, Sir Kent Woods, Chief Executive of the MHRA said, "The Clinical Practice Research Datalink will provide new data and research services that will improve the health of patients and also make the UK a world leader in life sciences research." David Willetts, Minister for Universities and Science, said, "The UK is a world leader in life sciences, but both the research base and industry tell us that we could make better use of data in order to drive medical breakthroughs. The Clinical Practice Research Datalink will provide researchers with access to safeguarded data that respects patient confidentiality. This will give valuable insights into serious health conditions and ultimately help reduce the time it takes to develop new treatments." The GPRD became part of the data services provision from CPRD.

At its launch in April 2012, CPRD was established as the new, England-wide NHS observational and interventional research service. It has built on the research developments of the GPRD, and also the Health Research Support Service (HRSS) previously managed by the NIHR Research Capability Program.

- The GPRD was a large primary care database, containing anonymised primary care data and links to a number of NHS and other data sources. The GPRD specialised in providing anonymised data and research service capabilities to a variety of medical and public health studies.
- The HRSS was a pilot service to demonstrate the feasibility of research using a range of health-care information. The HRSS attempted to link sets of anonymised data for research studies. It no longer operates

CPRD remains housed within the Medicines and Healthcare products Regulatory Agency.

== Work of the CPRD ==
The CPRD builds on its predecessors' capabilities and aims to provide a range of services and products in the areas of medical research and public health care. Fundamental to the work of the CPRD is the collection and linkage of anonymised data sets and provision of research services.

=== Data ===
The CPRD utilises the maximum benefit of linked data sets and the UK's health system to provide researchers with access to high quality anonymous primary and secondary health care data. The data collected allows researchers access to a wealth of information including;

- Prescribed primary care drugs
- Laboratory data
- Consultations
- GP and hospital coded disease data
- Disease Registers
- Cancer Registers

The NHS provides, free at the point of delivery, healthcare to a population of 52 Million in England. With access to the data sets of NHS in England, Wales, Scotland and Northern Ireland the CPRD can provide a population of potentially up to 64 Million patients in the UK. Further access and partnerships have been established to include data sets from other European countries. The linking of anonomysed primary care data with large data registries and related data sets means the CPRD can offer a huge array of data and information for the inclusion in medical research studies. This will include areas such as; prescription drugs uses and effect, long term patient treatment strategy, long-term health benefit studies, epidemic and pandemic studies and demographic health and welfare studies.

For example, an analysis of 100 million GP consultations using CPRD data in 2016 provided the first substantial evidence of the increase in GP clinical workload in England.

=== Research services ===
The CPRD has a range of research experience and expertise including:

- Pharmacoepidemiology
- Pharmacoeconomics
- Research Guidance
- Protocol Development
- Research methodology
- Outcomes
- Risk benefit.
- Data verification services

The CPRD provides consulting services for a range of research activities. Provided by an experienced internal team, the research service offers advice on research methodology and research governance as well as a host of other services. Drawing from its expertise and predecessors' experience the CPRD research team has built a reputation for conducting high-end research projects, from protocol development, gaining approvals for research, data analysis and report and publication writing. The research capacity is such that the CPRD has the resource and expertise to undertake research projects on behalf of customers or independently, for a variety of undertakings from the commercial regulatory, charitable and academic sectors. A huge range of studies from the CPRD and predecessors have been published and a list of published papers can be found at CPRD Research

=== Interventional research services ===
The CPRD offers a range of interventional research services to facilitate the running of clinical trials.

- The assessment of the feasibility of research proposals.
- Data supply and verification services.
- Randomisation into the study at the point of care.
- Clinical trial management support.
- Long term follow up through routine data collection, minimising the problem of 'lost to follow up'.
- A framework for conducting pharmacogenetic studies.

== Information collected by the CPRD ==
The primary health care data collected by the CPRD is taken from participating GP surgeries in the United Kingdom. Personal identifiers are not collected, protecting the privacy of the individuals from whom the data comes. Data collected includes;

- Demographics (including age and sex)
- Medical symptoms, signs and diagnoses
- Therapy (medicines, vaccines, devices)
- Treatment outcomes
- Events leading to withdrawal of a drug or treatment
- Referrals to hospitals or specialists
- Laboratory tests, pathology results
- Lifestyle factors (height, weight, BMI, smoking and alcohol consumption)
- Socioeconomic status
- Patient registration, practice and consultation details

== See also ==
- Optimum Patient Care Research Database (OPCRD)
- The Health Improvement Network
- QResearch
- OpenSAFELY
