= IMS MAXIMS =

IMS MAXIMS is a supplier of electronic health record software to the public and private sectors in UK and the Republic of Ireland.

As of December 2016, its products were in use across 180 healthcare organisations, by 30,000 users each day for 13 million patients.

It has offices in Milton Keynes, Dún Laoghaire and Romania.

In 2014 IMS MAXIMS released the source code for its electronic patient-record system under the GNU Affero General Public License. The licence allowed NHS trusts to use and modify the software, while IMS MAXIMS offered implementation and support services. In September 2015, Taunton and Somerset NHS Foundation Trust became the first NHS trust to deploy openMAXIMS. A 2020 study of open-source electronic health-record systems reported that openMAXIMS appeared no longer to be actively maintained, recording its last commit as 2017.

The company also helped establish the openMAXIMS community interest company (CIC) to support development of the software. Its founding members included Taunton and Somerset NHS Foundation Trust, Blackpool Teaching Hospitals NHS Foundation Trust and St Helens and Knowsley NHS Trust. Ramsay Healthcare UK was also a member of the CIC.

In 2016, Taunton and Somerset NHS Foundation Trust, the first hospital in the UK to deploy openMAXIMS electronic health record, was named by Health Secretary Jeremy Hunt as a Global Digital Exemplar. The trust projected that the software would save £600,000 a year by 2018.

Ramsay Health Care UK installed the MAXIMS electronic patient record in all its 35 hospital sites in 2022, the first private healthcare provider in the UK to implement a system of this scale. It is to be installed in Jersey General Hospital in 2023.

The company is a founding member of INTEROPen, an organisation that aims to accelerate, promote, and encourage the use of open source solutions within health and social care..

IMS MAXIMS services are available to purchase on the UK Government's Crown Commercial Service G Cloud 8 Framework, NHS Shared Business Services Framework and Digital Outcomes and Specialists Framework.

The company has been shortlisted for two awards - Health Investor IT Innovator of the Year 2016 and Biomnis Healthcare Innovation 2013 - and was highly commended for eHealth Insider's Healthcare IT Product Innovation Award 2015.
