= GPES =

GPES may refer to:

- General Practice Extraction Service
- Ground Parachute Extraction System

== See also ==
- GPE (disambiguation)
