= Care.data =

care.data was a programme announced by the then Health and Social Care Information Centre in spring 2013. It aimed to extract data from GP surgeries into a central database through the General Practice Extraction Service (GPES). Members of the English population who were registered with GP practices were informed that data on their health would be uploaded to HSCIC unless they exercised their rights to object by informing their GP.

Data on patients who did not object would then be used in anonymised form by health care researchers, managers and planners including those outside the NHS such as academic institutions or commercial organisations. The use of identifiable data is governed by the common law on confidentiality, UK data protection legislation, the National Health Service Act 2006 and the Health and Social Care Act 2012. Identifiable data can only be released in compliance with those laws. Software and services were being provided by Atos which has itself received criticism for some of its other UK government projects.

Since its launch, the care.data program was controversial. Initially criticism focused around the lack of patient awareness of the programme, and the lack of clarity around options for opting out of the data extraction. The leaflet sent to households in England was criticised for only describing the benefits of the scheme, and not including an opt-out form. The programme was stopped in May 2014 and in October 2014 six clinical commissioning groups in four areas of England were selected to take part in a "pathfinder" programme involving 265 GP surgeries with 1.7 million patients across West Hampshire, Blackburn and Darwen, Leeds and Somerset.

A review by the Cabinet Office Major Projects Authority said to have been conducted in October 2014 concluded that the program had “major issues with project definition, schedule, budget, quality and/or benefits delivery, which at this stage do not appear to be manageable or resolvable”.

Atos was criticised by the Public Accounts Committee in December 2015 and accused of taking advantage of the Department of Health and not showing "an appropriate duty of care to the taxpayer”. The company is one of 8 suppliers working on the project and is to be paid £11.4 million, an increase on the original £8 million.

In June 2015, it was announced that the programme of data extraction would start again in Blackburn in September. In September 2015, it was announced that the programme had again been paused due to confidentiality concerns remaining unresolved.

The programme was abandoned in July 2016.

In May 2021 NHS Digital announced a new programme to replace the General Practice Extraction Service, General Practice Data for Planning and Research which was compared to Care.data. After widespread protests the launch was put back from 1 July to 1 September 2021. NHS Digital was criticised for failing to communicate its intentions beyond updating its website, effectively disenfranchising a huge portion of the general public who do not monitor the site. The new strategy is to be branded as Data Saves Lives. A spokesperson for MedConfidential said: "The biggest single issue is trust and unless the government gets this right they are going to collapse trust again."
