= Schillings =

International reputation and privacy consultancy

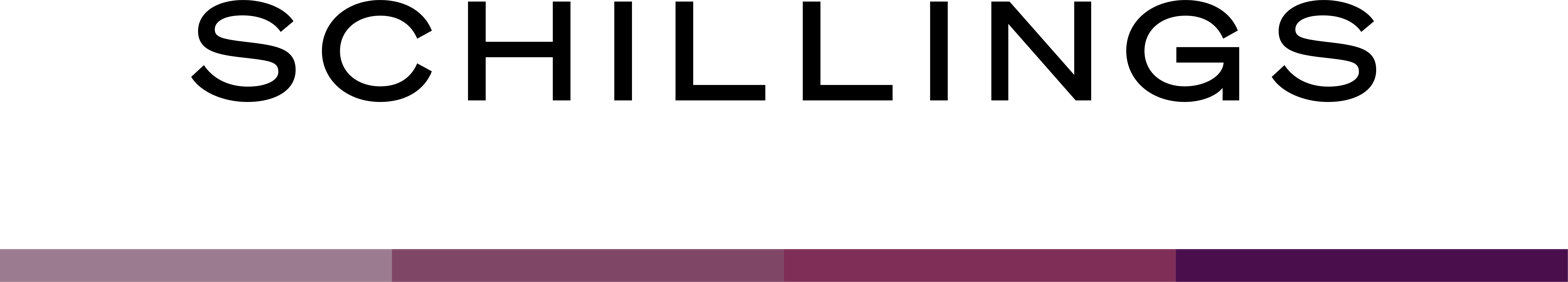
- Type: Limited liability partnership
- Industry: Law
- Founded: London, 1984
- Headquarters: London, United Kingdom
- Area served: United Kingdom, international
- Services: Legal advice and advocacy
- Website: schillingspartners.com

Schillings (originally Schilling & Lom) is a British reputation and privacy consultancy staffed by lawyers, investigators, communications advisors, security experts and diplomacy specialists. The company is an Alternative Business Structure (ABS) and is regulated and authorised by the UK's Solicitors Regulation Authority. It provides legal services in areas including media, privacy, technology, copyright and data protection.

== History ==
Schillings was founded in 1984 by Keith Schilling and Nicholas Lom and focused largely on media law, libel and privacy protection. It was called by Index on Censorship "the scourge of many a Fleet Street editor" for obtaining anonymised gagging orders to protect celebrity clients' privacy. In the early 2010s, the firm began to move away from pure media and libel work towards reputation protection for a large corporate, non-celebrity clientele.

In 2012, Schillings acquired the information security firm Vigilante Bespoke. In March 2013 the firm was granted two Alternative Business Structure licenses, one for the Schillings partnership and one for Schillings Corporate Limited which owns Vigilante Bespoke.

The company restructured its organisation in September 2013 and is now an integrated legal, risk management, IT security and investigation business. In 2023, the firm launched Schillings Communications. Schillings has offices in London, Miami, and Dublin.

== Notable cases ==
In 2004, Schillings represented Lance Armstrong when confronted with doping allegations in the book L. A. Confidentiel, by David Walsh and Pierre Ballester. Schillings was told to tell "every UK paper and broadcaster" to not re-state what was in the book. Gideon Benaim and Matthew Himsworth worked for Schillings on Armstrong's libel actions, including a 2004 defamation suit against The Sunday Times for referencing information in the book.

In 2004, Schillings represented Naomi Campbell in Campbell v MGN Ltd. Campbell was photographed leaving a rehabilitation clinic after public denials that she was a recovering drug addict. Campbell challenged the disclosure of information about the location of her Narcotics Anonymous meetings and the pictures that were used by the Daily Mirror. In March 2002, Campbell was awarded damages of £3500, but the case was overturned by the Court of Appeal six months later. The case was heard on appeal in the House of Lords and won in Campbell's favour through a 3:2 majority.

In May 2008, Keith Schilling won a privacy case in the Court of Appeal for the son of Harry Potter author J. K. Rowling. The case "says children of famous parents have the same right to expect privacy as children of parents who aren't well-known", granting them protection from intrusive photography.

In 2009, they represented Richard Granger, then head of NHS Connecting for Health, against Private Eye journalists questioning him about losses in the NHS IT project. Schillings cited Reynolds v Times Newspapers Ltd and demanded to know all the allegations and when they would be published claiming privacy and confidentiality. In response, the Private Eye editor Ian Hislop read out the letter from Schillings under parliamentary privilege in a select committee hearing to ensure that Schillings could not undertake legal action in relation to it.

In April and May 2011, Schillings acted for Ryan Giggs in CTB v News Group Newspapers and obtained a "super-injunction" aimed at preventing the publication by The Sun of the details of an alleged extra-marital relationship between Giggs and Imogen Thomas. The case gained widespread media coverage and political discussion in the UK.

In October 2012, Schillings' family division acted for the respondent's husband in the reported case BP v KP and NI. The case included not only companies by which one of the spouses was employed but also former colleagues and associates with whom a spouse was professionally acquainted.

In January 2013, Schillings acted for Ned RocknRoll, husband to Kate Winslet. RocknRoll obtained an order preventing the Sun newspaper from publishing private images of RocknRoll taken from a Facebook page.

In May 2013, Schillings partner Davina Katz acted for Dale Vince who won his appeal against his ex-wife's claim for maintenance. This was viewed as a landmark judgment that set a precedent for future financial claims that may be made many years after a relationship has ended.

In July 2013, Schillings acted for the author J. K. Rowling who brought proceedings in London's High Court against a lawyer who revealed that she had been writing under a pseudonym. This was leaked to the press and featured as a front-page story in The Sunday Times. Rowling won her case for breach of confidence; the lawyer's firm issued an apology and agreed to pay her legal costs in addition to making a "substantial" donation to The Soldier's Charity by way of damages.

In 2014, Schillings represented multi award-winning singer Adele in a successful privacy case against photo agency Corbis Images UK. The agency had unlawfully photographed and published images capturing intimate “milestone moments” of Adele’s two-year-old son. Corbis Images UK Limited agreed to pay damages and legal costs, and confirmed they would refrain from further use of the images.

In 2018, Schillings worked to stop the distribution of the book, Billion Dollar Whale: The Man Who Fooled Wall Street, Hollywood, and the World by Tom Wright and Bradley Hope of The Wall Street Journal in the United Kingdom. The tactics used to disrupt distribution to British booksellers included threatening letters and legal missives. Some book vendors were warned about putting the book into the "true crime" section of bookstores. The campaign against the publication of the book was unsuccessful and bookstores began selling copies on 12 September 2019.

In 2015, Schillings began working for Wirecard, a German financial services company, in its response to media reporting around its operations. This later became known as the Wirecard scandal and subsequently led to its insolvency in June 2020. It stopped working with Wirecard in July 2019.

In 2019, Schillings helped Philip Green in his ultimately unsuccessful attempt to have his name kept from appearing in The Daily Telegraph for his use of non-disclosure agreements. Justice Mark Warby, presiding in this case, noted that there had been "an unnecessary degree of partner involvement, and a degree of overmanning that cannot be justified."

In 2019, Schillings represented Meghan, Duchess of Sussex in a High Court claim against The Mail on Sunday over alleged misuse of private information, infringement of copyright, and breach of the Data Protection Act 2018. A Mail on Sunday spokesman said the paper stood by the story and would defend the case "vigorously". In February 2021, the Duchess won her case on summary judgment, with the court finding that Associated Newspapers Limited had interfered with the Duchess' reasonable expectation of privacy by publishing the letter. In May 2021, the Duchess won the remainder of her claim for copyright infringement. Associated Newspapers Limited brought an appeal against the decision, calling for a trial, but this was dismissed by the Court of Appeal.

Schillings acted for Prince Harry, Duke of Sussex in 2021, in a High Court libel claim against Associated Newspapers, publishers of the Mail on Sunday and MailOnline. The publication had falsely alleged that Prince Harry had "turned his back" on the Royal Marines. After proceedings were issued, both outlets issued formal apologies on 27 December, acknowledging the claims were untrue, and donating "substantial damages" to the Invictus Games Foundation.

Schillings represented Malaysian fugitive Jho Low, who was accused by US prosecutors of a money-laundering scheme connected to the 1Malaysia Development Berhad scandal.

Schillings represented Russian oligarch Alisher Usmanov, a long-time Vladimir Putin ally until he was placed under sanctions by the European Union due to the 2022 Russian invasion of Ukraine.

== Partners ==
- Keith Schilling was listed as 10th in The Times 100 Most Powerful Lawyers list 2008 and named in the Evening Standard's 2008 Survey of the 1000 most influential people in London. In 2013, Schilling was awarded the 'Super Lawyer' leading lawyer accolade.
- Rod Christie Miller, who is the chairman of Schillings.
- Rachel Atkins, who acted for Jimmy Nail and Sir Stelios Haji-Ioannou in his libel case against Michael O'Leary.
- Jenny Afia was promoted to partner on 1 January 2012. She was named Young Solicitor of the Year at the British Legal Awards in 2008. Spear's, a British magazine for high-net-worth individuals, commented that Afia is 'regularly sought out by the highest-profile clients', including the Duke and Duchess of Sussex and Johnny Depp. In 2017, Jenny rewrote Instagram's terms and conditions in child-friendly language as part of the Growing Up Digital taskforce. In 2026 The Guardian reported that she had sent a cease and desist letter on behalf of her client David Walliams https://www.theguardian.com/tv-and-radio/ng-interactive/2026/nov/10/david-walliams-accused-sex-grooming-allegations-young-women
- Tim Robinson, a former major general in the British Army.

=== Former partners ===
- Simon Smith, who has worked with Keira Knightley, Pam Brighton, Caprice, the Government of Saudi Arabia, Tiger Woods, Rolf Harris and Cristiano Ronaldo.
- Davina Katz (née Hay), who led the firm's family division and left to set up Katz Partners LLP.
- Chris Scott left Schillings and founded reputation management firm Slateford.
- John Kelly left Schillings to join Harbottle & Lewis in May 2013.
- Gideon Benaim left Schillings to join Simkins in September 2012.
