= OPCS-4 =

Procedural classification used in the United Kingdom

- OPCS Classification of Interventions and Procedures
- Abbreviation: OPCS
- Status: Published
- Latest version: OPCS-4.10; April 2023
- Organization: NHS Digital
- Domain: Medical classification
- Copyright: Crown copyright
- Website: OPCS-4 NHS Digital

OPCS-4, or more formally OPCS Classification of Interventions and Procedures version 4, is the procedural classification used by clinical coders within National Health Service (NHS) hospitals of NHS England, NHS Scotland, NHS Wales and Health and Social Care in Northern Ireland. It is based on the earlier Office of Population Censuses and Surveys Classification of Surgical Operations and Procedures (4th revision), and retains the OPCS abbreviation from this now defunct publication.

OPCS-4 codifies operations, procedures and interventions performed during in-patient stays, day case surgery and some out-patient treatments in NHS hospitals. Though the code structure is different, as a code set, OPCS-4 is comparable to the American Medical Association's Current Procedural Terminology.

As a publication, OPCS-4 is split into two volumes; a tabular list (Volume I) and an alphabetical index (Volume II). An electronic version is also available. However, a number of supplementary publications are also used by coding staff.

== History ==
The first NHS procedural classification was published in 1970 by the Office of Population Censuses and Surveys (OPCS) as the Classification of Surgical Operations, the second revision came in 1971. A completely re-written classification was produced and released in 1977, referred to as OPCS3. In 1989 the 4th revision was released as the OPCS Classification of Surgical Operations and Procedures (4th revision), with a second revision coming a year later usually shorted to OPCS-4.2. Responsibility for the classifications used in the NHS, including OPCS-4, passed to the NHS Information Authority (NHS IA) when it formed in 1999.

By 2003, the NHS IA had realised OPCS-4.2 no longer accurately reflected many of the procedures being performed in the UK healthcare system. As a medium term measure, a project to replace OPCS-4 with a more robust method of procedure coding was proposed and partially developed. Rather than using a sequence of codes to capture activity, the new classification would have used a single alphanumeric code up to 15 characters long. When the NHS IA was superseded by NHS Connecting for Health (NHS CFH) in 2005, the project was placed on indefinite hold, and a program of annual revisions to OPCS-4 was implemented. Much of the development work for the suspended project was reused to produce the initial expansion and enhancement of OPCS-4.2 to OPCS-4.3. However, OPCS-4.2 remained the mandated method of procedural classification in the NHS setting until March 2006.

Since the implementation of OPCS-4.3 in April 2006 there have been six further editions of OPCS-4 released. Each becoming the mandated classification on 1 April in the year of publication.

OPCS-4 version mandated for use (financial year)

- 1989–1990 OPCS-4
- 1990–2006 OPCS-4.2
- 2006–07 OPCS-4.3
- 2007–09 OPCS-4.4
- 2009–11 OPCS-4.5
- 2011–14 OPCS-4.6
- 2014–17 OPCS-4.7
- 2017–20 OPCS-4.8
- 2020–23 OPCS-4.9
- Since 1 April 2023 OPCS-4.10 (until further notice)

Whilst additions to OPCS-4 are reviewed on an annual basis, the long term plan is to replace OPCS-4 with SNOMED CT.

On 31 March 2013 NHS CFH ceased to exist. On 1 April 2013, the Health and Social Care Information Centre's (HSCIC) Clinical Classifications Service (CCS) became responsible for the revision and maintenance of OPCS-4. On 1 April 2016, HSCIC was rebranded to NHS Digital; responsibility for OPCS-4 remains with NHS Digital. NHS Digital merged with NHS England 1 February 2023.

== Volume I - Tabular List ==
OPCS-4 Volume I is split into 24 chapters:

- Chapter A - Nervous System
- Chapter B - Endocrine System and Breast
- Chapter C - Eye
- Chapter D - Ear
- Chapter E - Respiratory Tract
- Chapter F - Mouth
- Chapter G - Upper Digestive System
- Chapter H - Lower Digestive System
- Chapter J - Other Abdominal Organs, Principally Digestive
- Chapter K - Heart
- Chapter L - Arteries and Veins
- Chapter M - Urinary
- Chapter N - Male Genital Organs
- Chapter P - Lower Female Genital Tract
- Chapter Q - Upper Female Genital Tract
- Chapter R - Female Genital Tract Associated with Pregnancy, Childbirth and the Puerperium
- Chapter S - Skin
- Chapter T - Soft Tissue
- Chapter U - Diagnostic Imaging, Testing and Rehabilitation
- Chapter V - Bones and Joints of Skull and Spine
- Chapter W - Other Bones and Joints
- Chapter X - Miscellaneous Operations
- Chapter Y - Subsidiary Classification of Methods of Operation
- Chapter Z - Subsidiary Classification of Sites of Operation

=== "Missing" chapters ===
==== I-codes ====
There is currently no Chapter I. Nor are there any codes beginning with an "I".

==== O-codes ====
Whilst there is no Chapter O, codes beginning with an "O" can be found in OPCS-4. These were added to chapters when all the available 3-character code blocks were exhausted, but further classifications were needed. They are also referred to as "overflow codes", and are located at the end of the related chapter. When indexing a procedure or intervention that is classified to an O-code, the letter denoting the chapter the code is found in is given in parentheses after the code. For example: O04.- Embolisation Artery Aneurysmal Transluminal Percutaneous NEC (L).

=== Code structure ===
OPCS-4 is an alphanumeric nomenclature, and uses a four character code layout; similar to that found in ICD-10. The first character is always a letter. With the exception of the O-codes mentioned above, the letter indicates the chapter the code is from. The second, third and fourth characters are always numbers. A full stop (.) separates the third and fourth characters. Also, unlike ICD-10, there are no three character codes within OPCS-4.

Although OPCS-4 is used to classify procedures and interventions, and ICD-10 classifies diagnoses; their chapters do not correlate. That is to say; Chapter A of OPCS-4 is not used to classify treatments for conditions in Chapter I of ICD-10.

Syntax of an example OPCS-4 code
1st character	2nd character	3rd character	.	4th character
A	0	1	.	1

== Volume II - Alphabetical Index ==
OPCS-4 Volume II is an index for looking up codes in Volume I. It is bad practice to use it by itself, as some trails only index to the 3rd character category, rather than the 4th character rubric.

It is split into four numbered sections, along with an introduction section.

=== Introduction ===
The introduction gives a brief guide on using OPCS-4, and defines some abbreviations; for example NEC (Not Elsewhere Classified).

=== Section I – Alphabetical Index of Interventions and Surgical Procedures ===
This is the main bulk of the index, and contains the mechanism of looking up codes within the tabular list.

Terms are indexed in a What, Where, How method. For example, oesophagogastroduodenoscopy is trailed via Examination (the What), Gastrointestinal Tract Upper (the Where), Endoscopic Fibreoptic (the How).

=== Section II – Alphabetical Index of Surgical Eponyms ===
This list of surgical eponyms, contains common NHS procedures that may also be known by the surgeon, team or institution that developed the method or device used. For example, the Birmingham hip resurfacing and the Thompson Hemiarthroplasty.

The eponyms list is no longer maintained and has not been updated since 2008 and is "only retained for legacy purposes"

=== Section III – Alphabetical Index of Surgical Abbreviations ===
This section of the Volume II contains an alphabetical list of common abbreviations and their definitions. For example, ECMO - Extracorporeal Membrane Oxygenation.

As there are few instances where the abbreviation has been used more than once, and medical language is liable to change; descriptors are given to clarify all abbreviations. For example, SST could stand for Serum Skin Test or Short Synacthen Test.

=== Section IV – Alphabetical Index of Common Surgical Suffixes ===
This section of Volume II is a single page glossary that defines suffixes that are used throughout the classification. For example, -otomy.

== Supplementary publications ==
There are a number of publications that supplement OPCS-4.

=== Standards book ===
The National Clinical Coding Standards OPCS-4 is a reference book on how to use the classification, and provides guidance through examples. It is initially supplied to novice coders who attend a standards course run by a CCS approved trainer. Whilst each revision to OPCS-4 sees the issue of a new manual; any updates or corrections are issued electronically, and the onus is on the coder to update them by hand.

Prior to OPCS-4.7, and the move of maintenance responsibility to NHS Digital, the standards book was known as the Clinical Coding Instruction Manual.

=== ICD-10 and OPCS-4 Classifications Content Changes ===
Minor changes and coding advice for both ICD-10 and OPCS-4 are disseminated through the ICD-10 and OPCS-4 Classifications Content Changes. Until March 2022 this publication was known as The Coding Clinic, which was initially issued as a printed newsletter. Then, in 2012, the format was switched to a single, compendium-like electronic publication.

=== High Cost Drugs List ===
Maintained by the Department of Health's (DH) Payment by Results team; the High Cost Drugs List was a catalogue of drugs licensed for use in the NHS that are excluded from the Payment by Results (PbR) tariff.

Although reviewed annually; the list required updates to be published infrequently. Any changes that were made, however, would always be valid from the start of the next April – even in years with no revision to OPCS-4. The list consists of the generic names of certain drugs next to the relevant OPCS-4 code. The guidance section of the list stated that it was down to the clinical staff to use the generic instead of brand names.

=== Chemotherapy Regimens List ===
The Chemotherapy Regimens List, also issued by the DH Payment by Results team, is for the coding of administration of antineoplastic drugs. Organised alphabetically, the list contains adult and paediatric chemotherapy regimens used in the NHS. Adult Drug trials are excluded as they are usually financed by the trial's commissioner, for example a pharmaceutical company or cancer charity.

The National Clinical Coding Standards OPCS-4 and both of the DH lists are issued to coders via Terminology Reference Data Update Distribution Service (TRUD) and on the NHS England platform Delen

The Chemotherapy Regimens list has not been updated since 2017.

== Copyright ==
As an NHS publication, OPCS-4 is covered by Crown Copyright.

== Derived works ==
The Clinical Coding and Schedule Development (CCSD) Group's Schedule of Procedures is based upon OPCS-4.

== See also ==
- ICD-10
