= EBooking =

E-booking or eBooking (electronic booking), making a reservation or appointment for a service via the internet, may refer to:

- E-Booking (UK government project), a project of the UK Governments 'e-Government' program
  - Choose and Book, a software application for the National Health Service (NHS) in England
  - NHS e-Referral Service, an electronic referral system developed for the Health and Social Care Information Centre
- Computer reservations system, a computerized system used to conduct transactions
  - Internet booking engine, a website that allows consumers and travel agents to book travel
  - Airline reservations system, part of the passenger service systems (PSS)
- Appointment scheduling software, allows businesses and professionals to manage appointments and bookings

== See also ==
- Electronic ticket, the digital ticket equivalent of a paper ticket
- Ebookers, an Orbitz company
- Booking.com, a travel fare aggregator website and travel metasearch engine, owned and operated by Booking Holdings
