= Patient choice =

Patient choice is a concept introduced into the NHS in England. Most patients are supposed to be able to choose the clinician whom they want to provide them with healthcare and that money to pay for the service should follow their choice. Before the advent of the internal market, in principle, a GP could refer a patient to any specialist in the UK. When contracts were introduced in 1990 these were called extracontractual referrals. From 1999 the concept of Out of Area Treatments was developed. These referrals were not necessarily related to choice made by a patient. Specialised treatments were not, and are not, available in every area.

The regulations provide that a patient can choose to be seen by any NHS trust, public body, commercial organisation or third sector body, provided it holds a “commissioning contract” either with NHS England or a Clinical Commissioning Group when they are referred by their GP, community dentist or optometrist for treatment that is not identified as being immediately required. The Government’s mandate to NHS England for 2016-17 issued by Jeremy Hunt specifies “We want people to be empowered to shape and manage their own health and care and make meaningful choices, particularly for maternity services, people with long term conditions and end-of-life care”.

== History ==
- 2002 - Patient choice pilots begin. Patients with coronary disease are offered faster care from alternative providers
- 2003 - All NHS patients likely to wait more than six months for inpatient treatment, offered choice of quicker treatment at alternative provider
- January 2006 - patients referred to hospital could choose between at least four hospitals.
- April 2006 – launch of extended choice – patients have access to a national menu of hospitals including NHS foundation trusts, independent sector treatment centres (ISTCs) and independent sector (IS) providers on what is known as the Extended Choice Network.
- July 2007 – launch of Free Choice at a specialty level – patients have free choice in orthopaedics.
- December 2007 - patients have free choice in general surgery, gynaecology and cardiology.
- April 2008 - Under what is known as Free Choice policy, most patients have been able to choose services from any hospital provider that is clinically appropriate and meets NHS standards and costs, including NHS foundation trusts, acute trusts and many independent sector providers and their hospitals.
- December 2012 National Health Service Commissioning Board and Clinical Commissioning Groups (Responsibilities and Standing Rules) Regulations 2012
- April 2014 policy extended to mental health. Guidance says "This means having a right to choose which team, led by a named healthcare professional, delivers their care and treatment.
- October 2014 the Five Year Forward View asserts "We will make good on the NHS’ longstanding promise to give patients choice over where and how they receive care”.

== Exceptions to policy ==
Around 80% patients referred by their GP to a first outpatient hospital appointment were eligible to choose the hospital. There are however some exceptions to hospital choice policy. These exceptions include those where speed of access is important such as suspected cancer 2 week wait referrals and urgent referrals such as suspected stroke and heart attack. Referrals to mental health and maternity services were excluded from the policy until April 2014. Patients who are detained, and serving members of the armed forces are not entitled to exercise choice.

== NHS Constitution ==
The NHS Constitution for England includes a right to choice. It states: You have the right to make choices about your NHS care and to information to support these choices. The options available to you will develop over time and depend on your individual needs. It also repeats the requirements specified in the GP contract: You have the right to choose your GP practice, and to be accepted by that practice unless there are reasonable grounds to refuse, in which case you will be informed of those reasons. You have the right to express a preference for using a particular doctor within your GP practice, and for the practice to try to comply.

CCG and NHS England are required by the regulations to “make arrangements” to give effect to the right of patients to exercise their patient choice. It is for the clinician making the referral to decide whether it is clinically appropriate. The right to choice only extends to a first appointment. It does not imply that any chosen treatment must be paid for. That would depend on the terms of the provider's contract.

Spire Healthcare complained to Monitor (NHS) in 2013 that the Clinical Commissioning Groups in Blackpool, and in Fylde and Wyre were not doing enough to encourage patient choice, but their complaint was dismissed in September 2014.

== Comparing hospitals ==
It is intended that patients can choose the hospital they are seen in by comparing clinical quality, waiting times, location and other patients' opinions. In order to enable patients to compare and choose hospitals the national NHS website established a hospital comparison tool. The information that users can access to compare hospital performance can include:

- The number of procedures carried out
- Waiting times
- Average time spent in hospital
- Patient outcomes (Readmission rates)
- Rates of infection
- Overall hospital performance (Care Quality Commission Statistics)
- What patients say about their overall care
- What visitors to www.nhs.uk say
- Results from the national survey of inpatients
- Quality of food
- Car parking
- Disabled access

Using the hospital comparison tool is supposed to be quite simple. Users enter their postcode and the condition that they are being referred for.

=== Booking appointments ===
IN 2005 an electronic booking service known as Choose and Book was introduced across the NHS in England. This service enabled GPs and patients to shortlist a list of clinically appropriate hospitals for the patient to choose from, and lets the patient make appointments with hospitals either online or over the phone. Choose and Book was based around Directory of Services which includes the majority of NHS hospital services for GPs to shortlist for their patients to choose from. GPs were given financial incentives to use the system

Choose and Book was replaced by the NHS e-Referral Service in June 2015.

== Maternity services ==
The 1993 report, Changing Childbirth, called choice, control, and continuity of carer for the mother as the most important tenets of maternity care, but its recommendations were not delivered.

Baroness Cumberlege conducted a review of maternity services for NHS England in 2015. Better Births, the report of the national maternity review recommended that all women should have the choice to give birth where they want, with the support of the same midwife throughout pregnancy, labour and the early weeks of motherhood, with control over a personal maternity care budget of £3,000 to be spent on the NHS care they choose. This would be driven by a personal care plan, updated during pregnancy. Every woman should have an electronic patient record which they can access and add to.

== Performance ==
The proportion of patients who reported that they were offered a choice of provider rose steadily until 2010 when 32% of those responding to the inpatient survey reported that they had been offered a choice. By 2013 the proportion had fallen to 27%.

== See also ==
Patient participation
