= NHS.net =

NHS email, diary, and directory system

NHSmail is an email, diary and directory system for National Health Service (NHS) employees in England and Scotland. The system is not for patients of the NHS. Retired NHS staff do not have access.

NHSmail previously allowed faxes to be sent, however this was phased out at the end of March 2015.

NHS Scotland have announced their intention to phase-out the use of NHSmail for users in Scotland between July 2020 and September 2020, with NHS Scotland users migrating to Microsoft 365. NHS Scotland plans to adopt the nhs.scot domain.

== Background ==
=== History ===
NHS.net e-mail initially offered 64Mb of storage. In 2006 it was improved and storage space was unlimited. Storage space has since been reduced to 400MB or 1GB depending on account service level. In 2013 the storage was doubled for all users in response to feedback from them.

As of 2021, all users of NHSmail receive a 4GB mailbox by default. Each NHS organisation can assign up to 10% of their users with an expanded mailbox of 50GB in size. In addition, all users receive a 100GB online archive facility for long-term storage of emails.

=== Underlying technology ===
Until 2021, NHSmail used a customised version of Microsoft Exchange 2013.

In March 2020, NHS Digital deployed Microsoft Teams across the NHSmail platform. Access to Microsoft Teams was provided via a nationally negotiated licence agreement known as "Microsoft 365 E3 Restricted", commonly referred to as "E3R"

In 2021, the NHSmail service transitioned from on-premise email storage to Microsoft Exchange Online

== Client-side access ==
=== Web interface ===
The web interface uses Outlook Web Access. The service can be accessed via the internet from https://portal.nhs.net.

=== Microsoft exchange ===
NHSmail may be accessed from the internet by Microsoft Outlook on Windows or Microsoft Entourage on Mac OS X. Auto-configuration is available if the user's e-mail address is provided.

Mobile devices that support the Exchange ActiveSync protocol can also be linked to the service. Currently the NHSmail service supports iOS and Android devices running the Microsoft Outlook app to connect.

=== IMAP ===
Standards-compliant IMAP was available only from within the N3 network until around August 2018 when it was reintroduced into the Internet, however a local administrator must enable this on a per-account basis.

Access to mail was possible via imap.nhs.net. The internal SMTP server was send.nhs.net.

After migration to Exchange Online, the server settings transitioned to the Microsoft default

== Security ==
NHSmail has been approved for securely exchanging patient information by non-IT groups such as the British Medical Association (BMA), the Royal College of Nursing (RCN) and the Chartered Society of Physiotherapy (CSP).

Emails that may contain personally identifiable information, sensitive information, or medical information have been assessed by the UK Government's Communications-Electronics Security Group (CESG) as requiring protection to Business Impact Level 4 (B-IL 4). This was assessed in reference to CESGs guidance on Technical Risk Assessment for the UK Cabinet Office published as HMG IA Standard No 1 (IA1 – Technical Risk Assessment), and defined by the potential distress or embarrassment a breach of the system could cause NHS patients, as given in the Impact Level table on p. 54 of the Standard.

The current NHSmail services have (with a waiver allowing access from uncontrolled end points over the internet) been assessed as providing a level of security consistent with B-IL 3. The B-IL 3 rating will be maintained with the introduction of NHSmail2, however this rating is not consistent with CESG's requirements for protecting personal information of this sensitivity.

The service can be used to email a range of other Government email services such as the Home Office, secure local government services, police, MoD etc. Access to e-mail accounts can be provided voluntarily through a delegate option in Microsoft Outlook.

Each NHSMail organisation has at least one local administrator with the ability to manage accounts, including the resetting of passwords and setting delegate access.

== Tag lines ==
Mail sent through NHS.net may have a 15-line tag essay appended to the end of the message.

== NHSmail 2 ==
In 2013 the owning organisation (then NHS Connecting for Health) announced that they wished to replace the existing NHSmail service as the contract was due to come to an end. In January 2014 the Health and Social Care Information Centre (HSCIC) confirmed that a business case for replacing the service had been approved by The Department of Health and Treasury. The previous service ran until a new contract was in place, with handover due in 2016.

In 2016, the NHSMail contract was transferred to Accenture, taking over from previous operator Vodafone.

A new user portal was launched, allowing for users to access support and guidance, as well as enabling additional functionality for local administrators to manage accounts. As part of this upgrade process, the service transitioned to Microsoft Exchange 2013.

== See also ==
- Comparison of webmail providers
