= QMAS =

QMAS may refer to:

- Quality Management and Analysis System, a computer system used by the United Kingdom's National Health Service
- Quality Migrant Admission Scheme, a points-based immigration system in Hong Kong
- Quality Measurement Advisory Service, a non-profit health organisation in the United States
- Queensland Music Awards, an annual music awards event held in Queensland, Australia
