= The Castle Spectre =

1797 play by Matthew Gregory Lewis

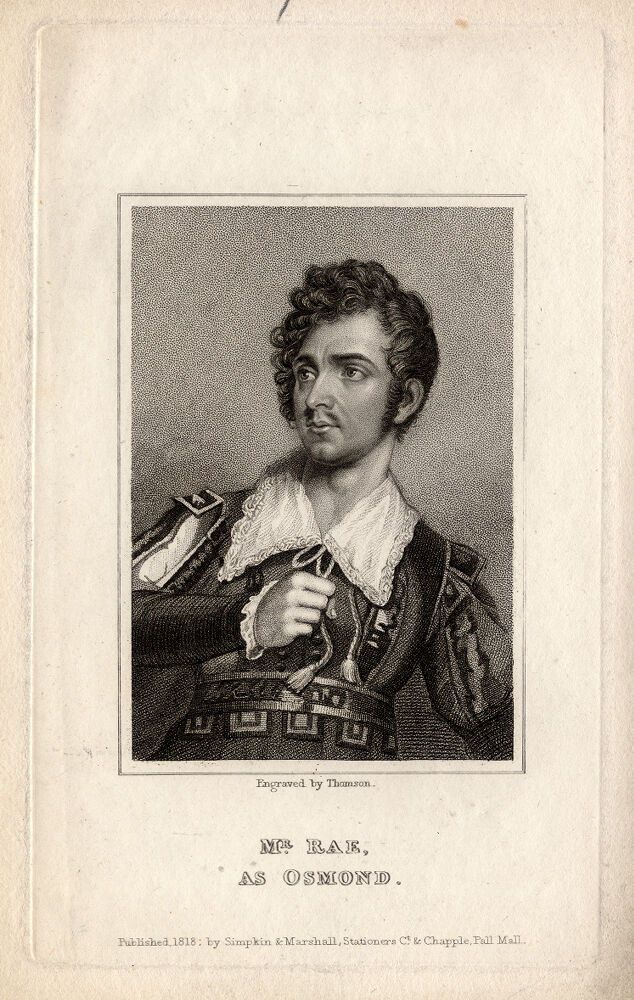
- Original language: English
- Written by: Matthew "Monk" Lewis
- Genre: Dramatic romance

Premiere
- Date: 14 December 1797
- Place: Theatre Royal, Drury Lane, London

The Castle Spectre is a 1797 dramatic romance in five acts by Matthew "Monk" Lewis. It is a Gothic drama set in medieval Conwy, Wales.

== History ==
The Castle Spectre was first performed at the Theatre Royal, Drury Lane, on 14 December 1797. The original cast included William Barrymore as Osmond, Richard Wroughton as Reginald, Charles Kemble as Percy, John Palmer as Father Philip, John Bannister as Motley, James Aickin as Kenrick, William Dowton as Hassan, John Hayman Packer as Allan, George Wathen as Edric, Jane Powell as Evelina and Dorothea Jordan as Angela. In a period when very few plays reached ten performances in a season, it was staged 47 times before June, when the theatre closed for the summer. The play had a long run also in the following year and remained in the repertoire until the late 1820s, and was revived until the end of the century. It also toured the provincial theatres and went through eleven printed editions from 1798 to 1803.

== Adaptations ==
Further evidence of its extraordinary popularity is given by the fact that it crossed the ocean and opened in New York on 1 June 1798. Moreover, it was turned into a prose romance in 1829 by Sarah Wilkinson.

A new adaptation of this play by Phil Willmott was given its first performance at the Warehouse Theatre Croydon on 5 December 1997. It was directed by Ted Craig and designed by Peter Lindley. The cast was as follows: Percy, son of the Earl of Caernavon – Damien Goodwin, Earl Osmond – Martyn Stanbridge, Angela – Mali Harries, Old Allan/Reginald, Earl of Conwy – Frank Ellis, Muley – Nick Wilton, Hassan – Clive Llewellyn.
