= Directory of services =

Electronic database

A Directory of Services is an electronic database of services held with details of the service offered.

== National Health Service ==
A clinical directory of services can be used in conjunction with a clinical decision support system.

In the English National Health Service, a directory has been compiled by every clinical commissioning group. NHS trusts, local authorities, voluntary and commercial organisations all provide information for these directories. The Directory is held centrally by the NHS Digital. It provides real-time information about services available to support patients. Pharmacy contractors are obliged to update their entries where the pharmacy’s opening hours change, either temporarily or permanently.

The directory is used by:

- NHS 111
- Choose and Book
- NHS Pathways
- NHS Choices

In 2005 Peter Davies a former NHS head of communications set up a scheme enabling primary care trusts to provide directory-type information in the Yellow Pages directory. By setting up a national agreement with Yellow Pages he hoped to keep costs down and solve the problem of PCT patches crossing different regional editions of the directory.

== Egypt ==
Managing Quality in Egypt: A Directory of Services for SMEs was launched in Cairo in March 2017 intended to assist small and medium-sized enterprises in developing countries to find national institutions to help them meet safety and technical standards necessary which they must meet in foreign markets. It has been created by the Egyptian Organization for Standardization and Quality, the Engineering Export Council of Egypt, the Physikalisch-Technische Bundesanstalt and the International Trade Centre.
