= NLH =

NLH may refer to:

- Norwegian University of Life Sciences, a public university located in Ås, Norway
- NLH, IATA code for Ninglang Luguhu Airport, in Yunnan Province, China
- New Literary History, an American academic journal
- National Library for Health, proposed reform of the National electronic Library for Health in Britain
- No-Limit Hold 'em, a variant of Texas hold 'em poker
- Norwegian Long Haul (ICAO: NLH), a low-cost long-haul airline
