= Qof =

QOF may refer to:

- Qoph, a letter
- Quality and Outcomes Framework, in UK primary health care.
