= General Practice Extraction Service =

British health research computer database

The General Practice Extraction Service (GPES or GP Extraction Service) was a British health service outcomes research computer database that collates statistical aggregated data (demographic cohorts) from individual medical records of GPs in England, for purposes independent of an individual's immediate health, such as public health research. It may conflict with sensitive medical confidentiality. It is similar to bioinformatics, epidemiology, and a health information exchange.

== History ==
With advances in computing technology and databases, many more types of public health research, including time-consuming cohort studies, are now possible; sifting through health data is quicker. Medical conditions can be cross-referenced with lifestyle.

The GPES began in 2007. The NHS has not had a good record for computer systems. The NHS National Programme for IT, a complete digital overhaul of the NHS's medical records, became NHS Connecting for Health, and then partly by the Health and Social Care Information Centre; a lot of money was effectively lost on NHS Connecting for Health, sometimes quoted at £12 billion. GPES was meant to cost £14m but has cost £40m. The system was discussed by the Public Accounts Committee (PAC) in 2015, who said the system has begun five years later than planned, being planned to start in 2009.

During its usage period, the system supported national extracts for NHS England and Public Health England, that not only enabled payment for General Practices. But added to data sets around such areas as Learning Disabilities Observatory.

By 2018, the GPET-Q engine was already seen as unfit for use and was beginning to be deprecated, favoring a much simpler system built in house at NHS Digital. Numerous fails of standard Disaster Recovery tests, showed that GPET-Q was becoming further unstable.

By 2020, GPET-Q had been entirely retired, yet NHS Digital continue to receive requests for data extracts that are fulfilled by NHS Digital. The General Practice Data for Planning and Research initiative, announced in May 2021, is intended to replace it.

== Function ==
The purpose of the GPES is not dissimilar to the Office for National Statistics in how it collates data. It consists of the query tool GPET-Q, and the extraction tool GPET-E. GPET-Q is designed by Paris-based Atos, a large IT services company.

The data extracted from the GPES database will help medical research in the United Kingdom, and possible disease prevention at an individual level and at the public level—such as health campaigns. It will find where diseases are prevalent, and in which age groups and geographic areas, and possibly which social class. Social class has a large effect on long-term health outcomes.

The way that GPET-Q did this was queries being built around keys dates and medical Read codes to define the conditions that were being sought for a particular collection of data. As the life-span of the system continued this moved to use SNOMED CT clinical codes as a way of making the extracts more specialised.

== Structure ==
It is part of the GP Collections of NHS Digital, formerly the Health and Social Care Information Centre or HSCIC. Another part is the Calculating Quality Reporting Service (CQRS).

Other similar UK databases include the Clinical Practice Research Datalink and The Health Improvement Network. It pursues similar work to UK public health observatories.

== See also ==
- Healthcare in the United Kingdom
- Institute of Public Health, in Cambridge
- Quality and Outcomes Framework
- Health Services Research (journal)
