= Healthcare in Gibraltar =

All Gibraltarians are entitled to health care in public wards and clinics at St Bernard's Hospital and primary health care centre. All other British citizens are also entitled to free-of-charge treatment on the Rock on presentation of a valid British passport during stays of up to 30 days. Dental treatment and prescribed medicines are free of charge for Gibraltarian students, pensioners and disabled individuals.

As St Bernards facilities are limited, people with more complex medical needs often have to travel abroad, usually to the UK for NHS care if they are eligible. In 2026, for the first time, a long‑distance robotic operation on a patient in Gibraltar was performed by a surgeon from the London Clinic using a robot equipped with a 3D HD camera and four arms.

== History ==
The Gibraltar Health Authority, established under the Medical (Gibraltar Health Authority) Act of 1987 is funded through the Gibraltar Group Practice Medical Scheme. It employs around 900 people, handling 37,000 A&E attendances, 40,000 outpatient appointments, and 90,000 GP visits a year. Some specialist care is provided by visiting consultants and in UK and Spanish hospitals. First-line medical and nursing services are provided at the Primary Care Centre, which has 16 GPs, with more specialised services available at St Bernard's Hospital, a 210-bed civilian hospital opened in 2005. Psychiatric care is provided by Ocean Views.

As of 2012 the authority was responsible for the health of some 27,000 individuals. The GHA and Social Welfare System are closely based upon their British counterparts, namely the National Health Service. As of 2003 the organisation was funded through roughly £19 million ($27 million) of social insurance stamp contributions through the Gibraltar Group Practice Medical Scheme.

In September 2014 Egton Medical Information Systems won a contract, worth up to £11.25m over 10 years, to deliver an electronic patient record for the health service of Gibraltar including a patient administration system, an emergency department system, e-prescribing and other software from Ascribe, which Emis bought in September 2013. The A&E unit at St Bernard's Hospital went live on 24 June 2015 using Emis' Symphony and it is planned that primary and community services and the acute hospital will start to use the Ascribe CaMIS patient administration system.

A Community Mental Health Team was established in 2017, and in 2018 the Gibraltar Health Authority School of Health Studies introduced a Mental Health Nursing degree to tackle difficulties in recruiting mental health nurses.
