= Summary Care Record =

Data stored about patients by the National Health Service in England

A Summary Care Record (SCR) was an electronic patient record, a summary of National Health Service patient data held on a central database covering England, part of the NHS National Programme for IT. The purpose of the database was to make patient data readily available anywhere that the patient seeks treatment, for example if they were staying away from their home town or if they were unable to give information for themselves. Despite opposition from some quarters, by September 2010, 424 GP practices across at least 36 primary care trusts had uploaded 2.7 million Summary Care Records. On 10 October 2010, the Health Secretary announced that the Coalition government would continue with the introduction, but that the records would "hold only the essential medical information needed in an emergency – that is medication, allergen and [drug] reactions". By March 2013, more than 24 million SCRs had been created across England.

In 2022 the Department of Health and Social Care set a new target for each integrated care system to set up a ‘shared care record’ accessible by health and adult social care providers by 2024. This replaced the summary care record programme.

== Content ==
Access to data was available to NHS personnel anywhere in England, but only if they had had the correct access rights on their smartcard approved by senior management. Pharmacists in five regions were given read-only access in an NHS England pilot in October 2014 so they could verify and compare a patient's medicines during medicine use reviews. Patients were able to view their own records via the HealthSpace website, which closed down in December 2012.

=== Initial content ===
The initial content of the database was to include the following:

- Drugs which the patient has been prescribed
- Known adverse reactions to drugs
- Known allergies

In his announcement on 10 October 2010, Health Secretary Andrew Lansley implied that its scope would in future be restricted to these three items, stating but that it would 'hold only the essential medical information needed in an emergency – that is medication, allergen and [drug] reactions'. It was also stated, however, that additional information can be added at the specific request of the patient.

=== Planned future content ===
It was originally intended that the database system would be upgraded in the future to add:

- Accident and Emergency discharge summaries
- Inpatient discharge summaries
- Outpatient discharge summaries
- Out of Hours GP service encounters
- Health and Social Care Common Assessment Framework Plans
- Contributions submitted by patients to their records via the HealthSpace website

However, following the Government announcement in October 2010 this is no longer envisaged.

== Implementation ==
Initial plans were that patients' records would be automatically be uploaded, without seeking patient consent. In December 2006, Sir Liam Donaldson, the Chief Medical Officer, wrote to GPs telling them that letters from patients requesting that their records should not be uploaded should be sent to Patricia Hewitt, the health secretary, for 'full consideration', causing consternation among privacy campaigners.

=== Opting-out introduced ===
As a result of pressure from privacy campaigners, the British Medical Association (BMA), the Ethics Committee of the Royal College of General Practitioners, and a report by the Department of Health's 'patients tsar' Harry Cayton (the Report of the Ministerial Taskforce on the Summary Care Record), the Government agreed that patients would be able to opt out of the Summary Care Record.

After further pressure, it was decided that patients would be contacted before records were uploaded to provide them with the opportunity to opt out. Unless the patient does explicitly opt-out within the specified period after being notified (12 weeks as of April 2010), their details will be uploaded. Once entered and viewed, records cannot be fully deleted.

A number of pilot schemes followed, in the primary care trust areas of Bolton, Bury, South Birmingham, Dorset, South West Essex, and Bradford & Airedale. In response to a freedom of information request, the Department of Health revealed that, 258,488 patients' clinical records had been updated to form Summary Care Records, as at 24 April 2009. The Department was unable to provide information on how many of these related to children.

Problems with the opting out scheme were reported by the independent evaluation, published 2010. In September 2010 it was reported that the opt-out rate had risen from 0.6% to nearly 1%

=== Roll-out begins ===
By the end of 2009 five strategic health authorities - NHS North West, NHS North East, NHS Yorkshire and the Humber, NHS London and NHS East of England – had announced that they would begin notifying patients and uploading records during 2010. The Department of Health agreed to make funding available to them within the 2009-2010 financial year for public information campaigns. By 18 March 2010 letters had been sent to at least some patients notifying them that their details were to be entered unless they opted out within 12 weeks.

On 16 April 2010 the Department of Health suspended the implementation of Summary Care Records in the areas leading the roll-out, following calls to do so by the British Medical Association. The BMA believed that implementation was moving forward too rapidly, that patients did not have enough information, and that it was too hard for them to opt out. A week later it was reported that several primary care trusts and the NHS East of England Strategic Health Authority were seeking a dispensation to continue with their implementation.

In August 2015 it was announced that retail pharmacies would be given access to NHS patients Summary Care Records after a pilot of 140 pharmacies in Somerset, Northampton, North Derbyshire, Sheffield and West Yorkshire, demonstrated "significant benefits". Pharmacists have to ask for a patient’s permission to view their record, and are required to complete the relevant Centre for Pharmacy Postgraduate Education e-learning package.

In 2018 information on long-term health conditions, medical history and immunisations was available, and according to NHS Digital, this reduced the burden on the health service during winter.

=== Patient awareness ===
Another concern that was raised in 2010 is that surveys have shown that most patients know nothing of the SCR scheme even if they have received leaflets, so that when people receive a package on the SCR it goes straight in the bin as junk mail.

== Criticism ==
In March 2010 the British Medical Association asked the British Government to suspend the roll-out of the database as it was an "imperfect system" being rushed into service prematurely, amid accusations that the system is insecure and that data has been uploaded without giving patients the opportunity to opt out.

The system has also been criticized for its inability to delete a patient record if a patient decides to withdraw from the system once their record has been created AND viewed. This has been stated to be due to the cost of completely deleting all information: "complete removal would require the hardware holding records to be completely sanitised. This is a process that destroys all data held, for example on a server or hard drive, and not just a particular record" and that in any case the record needs to be retained for legal reasons as "The issue of audit and the medico-legal evidential significance of the SCR will be extremely important and it would be inappropriate to provide tools that could completely remove a record, even if this were feasible."

SystmOne and other GP systems provide much more detailed information than the Summary Care Record. The implementation of SystmOne Prison across the prison estate "should be taken as a sign that a more widespread system is easily achievable".
