= Clearnet =

Clearnet may refer to:

- Clearnet Communications, a mobile telecommunications company that merged with Telus in 2000
- Clearnet (Telus Mobility), a MVNO launched by Telus in 2011
- ClearNET, the UK NHS clearing system (run by McKesson's UK arm)
- Clearnet (networking), non-darknet networks
- Banque Centrale de Compensation, a Paris-based clearing house, operating under the commercial name Clearnet from 1999 to 2003 then as LCH.Clearnet until 2016

== See also ==
- Darknet (disambiguation)
- Deep web (disambiguation)
