= National electronic Library for Health =

Former service provided by the National Health Service in the United Kingdom

The National electronic Library for Health (NeLH) was a digital library service provided by the NHS for healthcare professionals and the public between 1998 and 2006. It briefly became the National Library for Health and elements of it continue to this day as NHS Evidence, managed by the National Institute for Health and Care Excellence, and a range of services provided by Health Education England's Library and Knowledge Service Leads.

== Policy origins ==
Looking back from the mid 1990s the NHS Library Adviser Margaret Haines observed that during the 1980s NHS libraries had failed to capitalise on opportunities becoming available to them to advance their services and demonstrate their value. The main issues she saw were 'duplication and lack of co-ordination' arising from complex funding and a lack of integration with host organisations. Her concerns echoed those voiced by other senior NHS librarians. Judy Palmer, head librarian for the Oxfordshire region found that 'libraries were becoming increasingly marginalised, librarians were facing competition from other providers, that there were no recognisable national strategies, that there was massive duplication, fragmentation and information hoarding' In response to such concerns the British Library organised a seminar on NHS libraries, which came to be known as the Cumberlege Seminar. This was followed a year later by a second seminar held at the Kings Fund in London. As a result, the role of NHS Library Adviser was established (Margaret Haines being the first incumbent, followed by Veronica Fraser). A Health Service Guideline on NHS libraries was published in 1997, and a number of local initiatives took place, among them the establishment of an innovative project in Oxford to increase the use of the World Wide Web in NHS libraries. The idea of an open access digital library of high quality health related information was suggested by JA Muir Gray to Frank Burns CBE, at the time Chief Executive of Wirral NHS Trust Warrington and leading the development of Information for Health, an IT strategy for the NHS 1998-2005. The strategy stated:

A National Electronic Library for Health including accredited clinical reference material will be established.

== Creating The National Electronic Library for Health ==
Implementation of the NeLH began in October 1998. Robert Ward, a senior civil servant at the Department of Health, convened a meeting of interested parties in Leeds. Following from that meeting an implementation plan was developed by Ben Toth and Muir Gray and signed off by the Department of Health. A programme board was established; members included the NHS Library Adviser Veronica Fraser, a senior regional IMT Adviser Jeremy Thorp, and Bob Gann who was leading the development of NHS Direct online. The NeLH programme was included in the first portfolio of the NHS Information Authority; work began on implementation in January 1999, with the appointment of a project manager, Peter Bladen who had developed an electronic library service within the Special Hospitals service, and a project assistant Carol Shanley, based in the NHSIA's temporary offices in Calthorpe Road, Birmingham. The NeLH office later transferred to Aqueous II, Birmingham. Implementation began with the development of a business case and a pilot service to test the concept of the NeLH and provide evidence for the business case.

The Pilot NeLH was launched in November 2000, based around a central website (the core collection already in development via the then NHS Regional Librarians Group) with links to commissioned websites (specialist resources). Resources included a selection of evidence-based resources, some of which were restricted to (Cochrane Library and Clinical Evidence) NHSnet users only, a limitation which would be rectified in later years, and several Specialist (or Virtual Branch) Libraries covering primary care, infectious diseases, and emergency medicine, managed by Anne Brice. Over time the number of services increased, including a specialist medicines library and a federated search engine. Core staff numbered around 6 (later growing to over 30) in the early days of the library, including recruits and secondees from NHS libraries. An early goal was the establishment of a network of librarians across the NHS to promote the library, led by Alison Turner. Nick Rosen joined the team to promote the library, and Ian McKinnell joined later as technical lead. The pilot website was run from NHSIA servers, first in Bury St Edmunds and later in Exeter. The business case was developed by Peter Bladen with the support of staff seconded to the NHSIA from the Department of Health and HM Treasury, notably Joe Flanagan and went on to be commended by the Blair Government's Public Sector Productivity Panel as a notable use of the Treasury 5 Case model. The business case also became the subject of a chapter in Making Sense of Public Sector Investments. Following approval of the Full Business Case, procurement began, with the full service live in 2003.

== From NeLH to NLH to NHS Evidence ==
As part of its response to the Report of the Public Inquiry into children's heart surgery at the Bristol Royal Infirmary the Department of Health established the National Knowledge Service in 2003, tasking it with closer integration of digital and physical library services. A programme to establish a National Library for Health was established, which included a review from TFPL, a cost analysis by Robert Huggins Associates, and steps towards several NHS wide shared services, including: a business case for a unified NHS document delivery service developed by Bertha Man Low and colleagues; a question answering service; an NHS resolver and underlying enterprise architecture. With the demise of the NHSIA in 2005 the NeLH transferred its staff and operations to Connecting for Health, the body responsible for implementing the NHS National Programme for IT. The operational base remained in Birmingham but increasingly staff worked in the CFH main office in Leeds and also in London, first in Victoria and later at the CFH office in BMA House and a Department of Health office in Sea Containers House overlooking the River Thames. In 2008, with the National Programme for IT in decline, arrangements began to transfer the NeLH to NICE, where aspects of its service continues to operate, as NHS Evidence and with a range of electronic books, databases and electronic journals for use by NHS and other eligible staff procured by the HEE LKS Leads group.

== Successes and failures of the NeLH ==
The record of the NeLH shows a mixture of success, failure, and worthy experiment.

Successes include: the business case was recognized by HM Treasury as a model of its kind; the project was delivered to time and budget and became a valued service; funding was obtained to make the Cochrane Library available across the UK on a simple open basis; extra funding for Clinical Evidence was secured from the Modernisation Fund; a care pathways database was introduced; obstacles were overcome to make the Athens Access Management System available to the NHS as part of the NLH enterprise architecture; Health Language, a terminology service, was procured as a framework contract; the Children's BNF was introduced, funded by the Department of Health; Hitting the Headlines and Zetoc were procured; the fee paid by the NHS to the Copyright Licensing Agency was halved; co-operation with JISC increased; the PRODIGY programme was cancelled and replaced by Clinical Knowledge Summaries. Funding was found to support for the regional pharmacy information services; an online directory of library service points was funded; an NHS link resolver was implemented.

Among the failures: a z39.50 federated search supplied by Fretwell Downing could not be made to work; attempts to base the CLA licence on actual usage foundered; work with JISC to reduce double-dipping by academic publishers across HE-NHS made little progress; reform of the NHS libraries regional structure was only partly successful and the vision of a unified networked library for the NHS didn't survive; integration with CFH products and services was less than anticipated; a strategic partnership with Map of Medicine fell foul of the CFH commercial directorate; a planned partnership with ISABEL didn't survive the CFH procurement process. Plans to implement an NHS wide deal with BioMed Central were initiated but didn't progress. The plan do develop a database of Care Pathways floundered when the developing clinicians declined to share. Perhaps the key failures were not to embed the vision of NLH in the hearts and minds of senior stakeholders and those it was intended to serve, and to pay too little attention to sustainability.

Experiments included: a pilot of LibQual; the development of an XML standard for representing clinical guidelines; a DSpace implementation hosted by Hewlett Packard Laboratories; an RSS feed manager developed by Microsoft as part of its NHS Common User Interface project; and a browser based calendar and communication tool known as MyWorkPlace - a great idea but technically ahead of the technology available to the NHS at the time.

== Legacy ==
Seventeen years on from its conception many of the services offered by NeLH is still in place, albeit under the auspices of two different organisations: NICE for access to core digital content and Health Education England Library and Knowledge Service Leads for funding that content, undertaking overarching strategic development of healthcare library and knowledge services (LKS) as a business asset, and for developing the LKS workforce. Some elements of the NeLH infrastructure are still visible, notably OpenAthens, and the single-search engine (Healthcare Databases Advanced Search (HDAS)). The vision of a unified, seamless NHS library service for all staff and service users is now championed by Health Education England's Knowledge for Healthcare: a development framework for NHS Library and Knowledge Services in England. Acknowledging that many issues remain including: complexity of funding (with associated uncertainty of service offer, duplication, and inefficiency); and a lack of integration across the wider NHS and social care systems, local NHS library and knowledge services continue to offer a range of vital services and resources, underpinning decision making from the boardroom to bedside.

== Health Education England's proactive strategy ==
In 2016 Health Education England published a policy statement on library and knowledge services which replaces the 1997 Health Service Guideline on Library Services HSG(97)47. The policy reminds us that:

"The Secretary of State for Health has a duty, under the Health and Social Care Act 2012, to ensure “the use in the health service of evidence obtained from research”.

HEE commits to:

· Enabling all NHS workforce members to freely access library and knowledge services so that they can use the right knowledge and evidence to achieve excellent healthcare and health improvement.

· Developing NHS librarians and knowledge specialists to use their expertise to mobilise evidence obtained from research and organisational knowledge to underpin decision-making in the National Health Service in England.

· Developing NHS library and knowledge services into a coherent national service that is proactive and focused on the knowledge needs of the NHS and its workforce.

Further policy statements in the following years provided guidance on:

- Recommended ratios for NHS knowledge and library specialists
- The availability and use of learning space within NHS knowledge and library services
- Emotional support for embedded knowledge specialists working in clinical settings

Key parts of the NeLH and NLH legacy continues into the 21st century.
