= Highgate Private Hospital =

- Nuffield Health
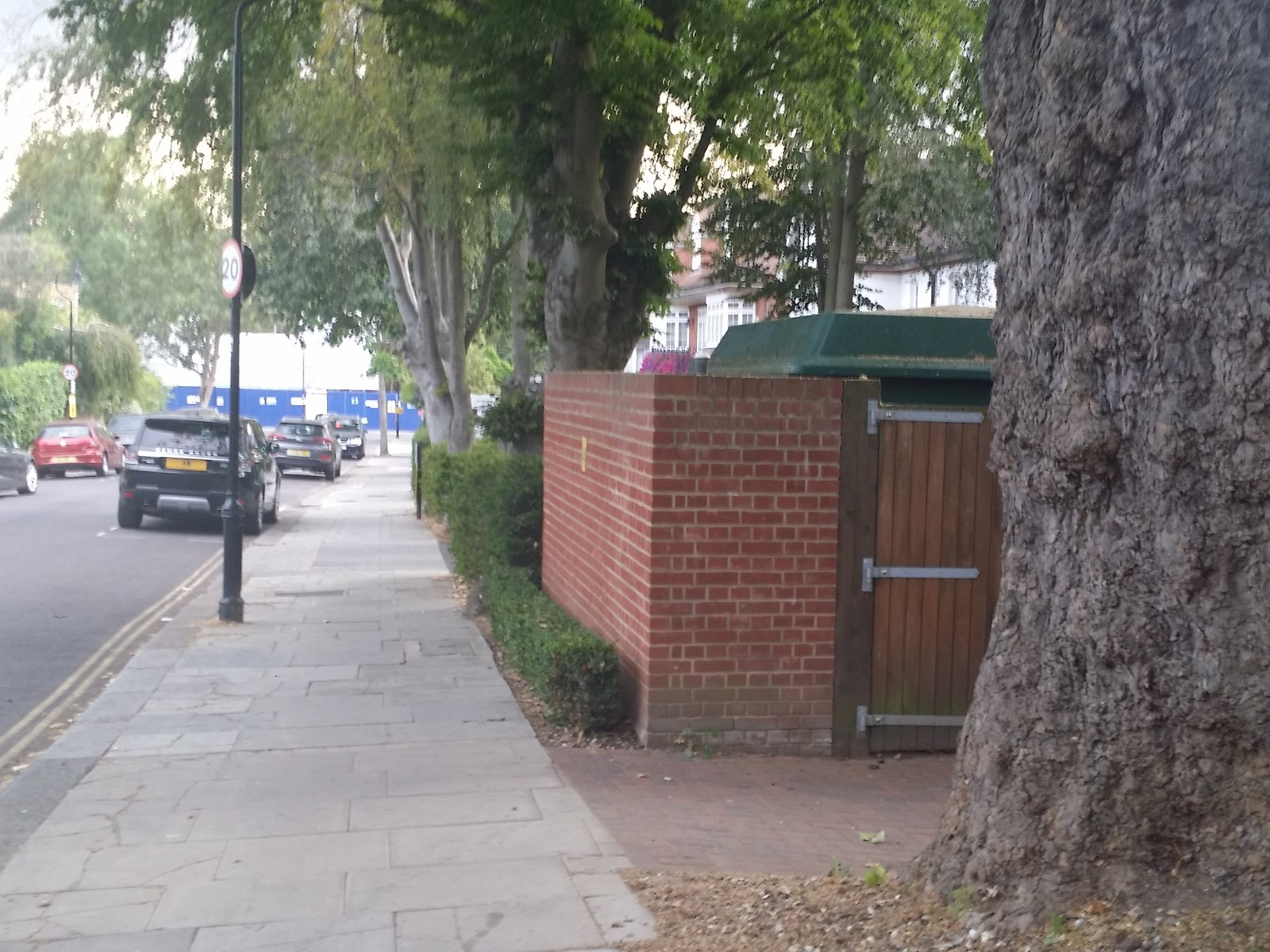
- Highgate Private Hospital (the white building on the right)

- Shown in Haringey

Geography
- Location: Highgate, England
- Coordinates: 51.5764°N 0.15672°W

Organisation
- Care system: Private & NHS

Services
- Emergency department: No

History
- Founded: 1988

Highgate Private Hospital, in View Road, Highgate Private Hospital is run by Nuffield Health.

== History ==
The hospital was established in 1988. The building was acquired by Health Care REIT, Inc. in 2015 along with Aspen Healthcare's three other London hospitals for £226 million and leased back to Aspen on a 25-year lease.

The hospital featured in a reported legal case in tort, Batt v Highgate Private Hospital [2004] which established that a widower could not recover damages in respect of the cost of the cosmetic surgery which had resulted in his wife's death at the hospital.

It was expanded during 2015 at a cost of £13 million to provide 43 en-suite patient rooms, four operating theatres, an Endoscopy Suite, Physiotherapy Suite, 15 outpatient rooms, and a private GP service. Neurosurgery services were expanded in 2013 with the recruitment of consultant neurosurgeon Mary Murphy.

On 28 September 2021, it was announced that Highgate Private Hospital had become part of Nuffield Health. This was part of a wider agreement that includes Parkside Private Hospital, The Holly Private Hospital, Cancer Centre London, The Edinburgh Clinic and Aspen Healthcare Corporate Office.

== Services ==
Highgate Hospital is part of the NHS patient choice scheme, meaning patients can opt to have procedures performed there rather than in an NHS hospital.
