= Healthera =

Digital Health Platform

- Company type: Private
- Industry: Digital health
- Founded: 2015
- Headquarters: Cambridge, England, United Kingdom
- Area served: United Kingdom
- Products: Digital health platform for prescription ordering, pharmacy services, and medicine management
- Services: Pharmacy ordering platform, prescription management, pharmacy service booking
- Website: healthera.co.uk

Healthera is a digital health platform, founded in the United Kingdom in 2015.

The platform consists of a patient-facing app, a patient-facing website, a pharmacy-facing platform, and several integrations with other healthcare providers. The platform also provides technology for pharmacy brands such as Superdrug.

Based in Cambridge, Healthera partners with pharmacies across the United Kingdom to provide a digital ordering service for patients.

Since its formation in 2015, Healthera has added prescription ordering, pharmacy service booking, OTC purchasing, and medicine alarm reminders as features on its platform.

In 2023, Healthera co-announced partnerships with Cegedim and iPlato (myGP).

In January 2024 it was announced that Healthera would partner Uber to provide a "same-hour prescription delivery" service in the United Kingdom.

== History ==
Formed by Cambridge University students, the company received its first investment from Cambridge Enterprise in November 2015, five months after the founders graduated. In 2018, Healthera raised £3m in Series A funding led by Accelerated Digital Ventures, with follow-on participation from Cambridge Enterprise, Future Care Capital, and existing angel investors.

Alliance Healthcare announced that Healthera would be the technology partner for the Alphega Pharmacy group in 2020 in order to offer a home-ordering service.

In June 2022, Healthera received funding from Serafund, a venture capital fund.

In November 2022, it was announced that Healthera would become the first pharmacy app integration for the NHS Electronic Prescription Service.

In December 2022, Healthera was given funding from Innovate UK.
