= Health and Social Care Network =

The Health and Social Care Network (HSCN) is a standards-based network that replaced the N3 network in the National Health Service (NHS) in England. It went live in April 2017. Transition to the new network was completed by November 2020.

== History ==
=== NHSnet ===
NHSnet was a private wide area network service used by the NHS England. It started operation in around 1995

NHSnet was managed jointly by BT and Cable & Wireless and was developed under the aegis of the NHS Information Authority. However the standards of service varied widely throughout the NHS due to different local practices and levels of equipment. NHSnet was succeeded by N3 in 2006. It is sometimes referred to (by a sort of retrospective nomination) as "N2".

Connections to NHSnet were strictly controlled by the NHS Information Authority, which specified the security required and data protocols allowed under its 'Code of Connect' agreements. Similarly, it controlled access to or from the Internet, including email, through managed gateways.

Organisations wishing to provide information or applications to their NHS partners over NHSnet had a choice of applying for their own Code of Connection, which required a considerable investment in time (typically 6 months), effort and infrastructure; or partnering with one of the restricted number of organisations (BT, Cable and Wireless and Ioko) able to use their own Code of Connect for these purposes.

NHSnet admin passwords were exposed, during the attack of Lulzsec in June 2011.

=== N3 ===
N3
- Type: Data and voice
- Location: UK
- Protocols: IP
- Operator: BT
- Established: 2003
- Current status: Operational
- Commercial?: No
- Funding: NHS
- Website: digital.nhs.uk/services/health-and-social-care-network

N3 was a national broadband network for the English National Health Service (NHS), connecting all NHS locations and 1.3 million employees across England. As of 2018 it was being phased out. In 2004, BT was awarded the contract to deliver and manage the IT project on behalf of the NHS. According to an ICO Decision Notice in relation to a freedom of information enquiry, the seven-year contract document ran to around 1000 pages and had a value in excess of £530m.

N3 was preceded by NHSnet, becoming N3 in 2006.

N3 provided the foundations to deliver other components of the NHS National Programme for IT (NPfIT) such as Choose and Book, the NHS Care Records Service, Electronic Prescriptions and the NHS Picture Archiving and Communications System.

==== Technical details ====
N3 runs over a high-speed IP-based virtual private network. It links acute hospitals and GP surgeries in England through 58 points of presence (POPs), and also has a further five POPs in Scotland. N3 is fully resilient at backbone and POP level, enabling 100% core network service availability. The standardised national infrastructure will enable the rollout of 21st Century healthcare IT applications and the next generation of IP-based converged communications solutions.

Compliance with ISO 20000.

A range of N3 hosting providers can provide Information Governance Statement of Compliance (IG SoC) accredited, secure, third-party application hosting services. Providers can also act in an advisory capacity to organisations wishing to offer bespoke applications to the NHS.

==== Progress ====
In March 2007, N3's Voice Services were launched. These services offer free on-net calls, and potential to reduce fixed-to-mobile costs.

As the N3 Service Provider (N3SP), BT works with NHS Connecting for Health (NHS CFH) to support the delivery of the NPfIT, and develop products and services to capitalise on N3's state-of-the-art capabilities.

The N3 network enables the user to access NHS Wide Web (nww) prefixed sites, as well as www.

== Transition ==
HSCN, delivered by multiple suppliers adhering to an agreed set of standards, is intended to progressively replace the N3 national healthcare network. The N3 data and voice networking contracts expired in March 2017. NHS Digital looked to replace a long-term single supplier contract with a marketplace of network options. The project for a new network was initially known as the Public Services Network for Health. In January 2017, the managed services provider Redcentric was appointed for a three-year period as the peering exchange provider. NHS Digital have also contracted with BT for the provision of transition network arrangements for the two to three years from April 2017. In November 2020 NHS Digital announced the completion of the HSCN migration and legacy network termination, with liabilities for the legacy N3 network terminated at the end of October 2020.
