= GPE =

GPE may refer to:

== Computing ==
- Geopolitical entity, in named-entity recognition
- GPE Palmtop Environment, a user interface
- Google Play edition, a mobile device series
- Google Plugin for Eclipse, in software development

== Education ==
- Global Partnership for Education, a World Bank programme
- Global Peace Exchange, at Florida State University, United States
- General physical education; see adapted physical education

== Science ==
- Gravitational potential energy
- External globus pallidus (GPe)
- Gross–Pitaevskii equation, in quantum physics
- GYPE, a protein

== Transport ==
- GP Express Airlines, an American airline
- Grand Paris Express, an extension of the Paris metro network

== Other uses ==
- European Grand Prix for Choral Singing
- General Precision Equipment, a former American manufacturing company
- Ghanaian Pidgin English
- Global political economy
- Guadeloupe national football team
