= NHS-wide Clearing Service =

The NWCS was the NHS-wide Clearing Service for NHS England and NHS Wales. It was a method of data exchange between NHS organisations, for non-clinical purposes such as statistical analysis set up in 1996. Previously Hospital Episode Statistics were collected by regional health authorities.

It was operated by McKesson, who supplied the ClearNET IT system and was superseded in 2007 by the Secondary Uses Service (SUS).
