= NHS Electronic Prescription Service =

The NHS Electronic Prescription Service is part of the NHS National Programme for IT of the National Health Service in England. It enables the electronic transfer of medical prescriptions from doctors (or other prescribers) to pharmacies and other dispensers and electronic notification to the reimbursement agency, NHS Prescription Services.

Patients may choose to receive a paper prescription if they do not want to specify a pharmacy.

In England, electronic repeat dispensing (eRD, also known as "batch prescribing") allows clinicians to authorise and issue a series of repeat prescriptions covering up to 12 months, using a single digital signature.

NHS Scotland operates a similar scheme, under the name Acute Medication Service (AMS).

As of 2022, prescribing in Wales was still largely paper-based.

== History ==
The roll-out of the service was delivered in two releases:

- Release 1 retains the paper prescription and adds a barcode to it which allows the dispensing pharmacy to access a centrally held copy of the prescription (the barcode does not encode the items prescribed). This phase has been extensively deployed among general practitioner systems and slightly less so in pharmacy systems.
- In Release 2, an electronic prescription can be used where the patient nominates a pharmacy. The prescription can be sent electronically, although a paper token (FP10DT) may be printed off also. Unlike a standard FP10, this is not a legal document, and no drugs can be legally dispensed without the electronic message downloaded from the NHS Spine identified by the unique barcode on the printed form.

In August 2018 NHS Digital announced that all the 1,311 eligible GP practices in London could use the service.

From November 2019 digital-only prescriptions were introduced across England.

In July 2021 it was announced that hospital trusts in England could begin testing electronic prescribing in Autumn 2021. This would enable hospital outpatient prescriptions to be sent electronically to patients’ nominated community pharmacy, and prescriptions to be sent to home care providers.

The Welsh Government confirmed plans in September 2021 to develop ePrescribing in Wales. Swansea Bay University Health Board had almost eradicated paper drug charts in 15 medical wards, using Hospital ePrescribing and Medicines Administration. This reduced the time nurses spent on medication rounds and reduced potential errors in prescriptions.

In November 2022, it was announced that the NHS Electronic Prescription Service would allow its first Pharmacy app integration (with Healthera).
