= Informing Healthcare =

Data-sharing programme in Wales

Informing Healthcare was set up by the Welsh Assembly Government in December 2003, to improve healthcare services for people in Wales by introducing modern ways of sharing and using information. It is one of the key enablers for 'Designed For Life'; the national ten year strategy to deliver better health and social care for Wales.

The central aim of the Informing Healthcare programme is to create a 'world class' technical infrastructure for NHS Wales that will allow information to be shared securely irrespective of organisational boundaries. It will also provide a consistent set of information and technology services for all organisations in NHS Wales.

Key principles of the programme are based on:

- A national co-ordinated approach
- Incremental change
- Best use of existing infrastructure and systems
- A balance between immediate improvement and investment in future improvements.

Consideration is also given to local priorities, whilst migrating to national designs and solutions.

Delivery of a single electronic health record for Welsh citizens, improvements to health information systems and development of health informatics staff are primary goals.

Informing Healthcare is based in Pencoed, Wales with North Wales offices in St Asaph. Dr Gwyn Thomas is Informing Healthcare’s Chief Executive Officer.

As part of the reorganisation of NHS Wales, Informing Healthcare has merged with Health Solutions Wales, Business Services Wales and the Primary Care Informatics Programme to create the NHS Wales Informatics Service (NWIS). The new organisation was formed in April 2010.

== Single Record ==
The vision is for information about individual patients to be available securely where and when it is needed through the Single Electronic Health Record.

A significant cause of current information problems is the lack of an immediately available, accurate patient record, accessible to those who require the information whether care takes place during the day, the evening or at the weekend. Patient records are held by many professionals in many settings, for example within hospital departments or pathology labs, either on paper or electronically. While general practitioners (GPs) hold the most complete record, this information is currently held within the GP practice and is not shared. This approach to record keeping means the whole picture of a patient’s care is fragmented.

The Single Electronic Record is designed to overcome these problems. It does not mean that all information will be held in one place, but provides a view of the patient’s health record derived from many sources. It means that health professionals will be able to access all the information they need, whenever and wherever required. This access will take place in a secure environment, and the information provided is limited to what any given professional needs to know.

The Single Electronic Health Record is built from a number of key components. The Individual Health Record (an electronic “bridge” between GP and urgent care settings), and the Welsh Clinical Portal (a clinical “healthspace” that will allow health professionals to access records, request results and order tests from a variety of sources and labs). These projects will be brought into use incrementally, so developers and clinicians can evaluate and restructure systems when needed.

The eventual goal is the development of an integrated approach to health and social care records, although full integration of these records is still in the developmental stage.

Informing Healthcare has introduced a code of practice to ensure patients are asked before their information can be viewed by a doctor or nurse outside their GP practice. This ensures patients know only the right healthcare professional is accessing the right information.

Informing Healthcare’s security policy been the focus of several positive media reports this year, including a feature by The Guardian, praising its commitment to patient consent and suggesting America can learn from the Welsh approach to computerised health records.

== Service Improvement ==
Informing Healthcare’s commitment to improving IT systems and to support delivery of the single electronic health record means upgrading, changing, or redesigning several existing systems.

For instance, Informing Healthcare is working to deliver new Laboratory Information Management Systems (LIMS) to all NHS trusts that will improve pathology services across Wales for the benefit of patients and staff. The new system will replace the 13 computer systems currently operating in the 18 main pathology laboratories in Wales. It will reduce the number of duplicated tests and mean that, no matter where a patient receives care, the results of tests will be readily available.

To help ease the pressure on radiology departments a new and improved radiology system, called Radis2, is now in the process of being implemented across Wales, and will eventually lead to an All Wales Radiology Management System. Radis2 replaces the existing RADIS, which is over 18 years old. The new system allows for better integration of systems such as PACS (picture archiving and communications system) and digital dictation. It also brings an improved database, making it easier to extract management information. All hospitals in Wales will have access to Radis2 by 2010.

In April 2009, the Cancer Information Network System Cymru (Canisc) was established as a national service making it easier for information about treatment to be shared. Designed originally by Cardiff’s Velindre NHS Trust in 1991, Informing Healthcare, along with Velindre and Health Solutions Wales delivered Canisc throughout Wales, and management of the new service will be under the Business Services Centre. The new national service allows any number of NHS Wales organisations to record assessments, treatments and follow up care into a common patient casenote, which any healthcare professional caring for that patient can access, thus giving a full picture of each individual's care wherever that person happens to be treated.

Some of Informing Healthcare's other projects include working with hospital pharmacies to improve medicines management; ensuring that patients are correctly identified via a Master Patient Index; and procuring the Map of Medicine, a clinical information and service design resource.

== Informing Healthcare and Health Informatics ==
Health informatics professionals are the people work with health IT or information. They cover a wide range of occupations including IT technicians, information analysts, project managers, medical records officers and clinical coders. Together they form a new and rapidly growing class of professional in NHS Wales.

Informing Healthcare is working to ensure Wales attracts new staff to work in this expanding field and to develop them by promoting education, training and professional development through the Welsh Health Informatics Professional Development Programme.
