= Darknet (disambiguation) =

A darknet is a network that can only be accessed with specific software, configurations, or authorization.

Darknet or dark net may also refer to:

- Dark web, the part of the World Wide Web which exists only in darknets
- Network telescope, or darknet, used to monitor network traffic on unallocated IP space
- Darknet (TV series), a 2013 Canadian horror television series
- Dark Net (TV series), a 2016 American documentary television series
- Darknet, an American nu metalcore band
- The Dark Net: Inside the Digital Underworld, 2014 book by Jamie Bartlett
- Operation Darknet, a campaign by the hacktivist group Anonymous

== See also ==
- Clearnet (disambiguation)
- Deep web (disambiguation)
