= Norwegian Electronic Health Library =

Norwegian web-based knowledge service

Helsebiblioteket.no
- Available in: no
- Creator: Norwegian Institute of Public Health
- Website: www.helsebiblioteket.no
- Commercial: No
- Registration: Optional
- Launched: June 2006
- Current status: Active

The Norwegian Electronic Health Library (Helsebiblioteket.no), established 2006, is a publicly funded web based knowledge service that provides Norwegian health workers with access to updated professional information and clinical decision tools.

This is done by

- providing free access to clinical point-of-care tools, electronic journals and databases through national subscriptions
- translating systematically reviewed research and making it accessible to Norwegian readers
- collecting web resources
- publishing news articles

The library is unique globally in giving general access to the entire population of a country to international point-of-care tools and the largest international medical journals. The Norwegian Electronic Health Library provides access to new research, patient leaflets and guidelines from national authorities, as well as guidelines, and procedures developed by renowned professional institutions. The library includes topic libraries for drugs, mental health, poisoning, quality assurance and public health.

The Norwegian Electronic Health Library is funded by Norway's National Budget. It is run by the Norwegian Institute of Public Health.

Helsebiblioteket.no was awarded «Library of the year 2011» by the Norwegian Library Association.

The Norwegian Electronic Health Library is widely used by health personnel, students, as well as lay people.

NHS Evidence is a similar public website for health professionals and students in the UK.
