= Deep web (disambiguation) =

The deep web is the part of the World Wide Web that is not indexed by traditional search engines.

Deep Web may also refer to:

- Deep Web (film), a 2015 documentary by Alex Winter
- Darknet, an overlay network
- Dark web, the part of the World Wide Web built on top of darknets
- "Deep Web", a 2012 song by Death Grips from No Love Deep Web
- "Deep Web", a 2023 song by Fede Vigevani

== See also ==
- Darknet (disambiguation)
- Clearnet (disambiguation)
