= General Practice Data for Planning and Research =

The General Practice Data for Planning and Research system was set up by the British National Health Service as a replacement for the General Practice Extraction Service as a means of transmitting data intended for use beyond that of providing individual health care. This might include healthcare planning, or research.

It was announced on 21 May 2021.

It received a cautious welcome for the potential benefits to Health Research, particularly as large scale medical data is providing valuable data on the most effective treatments for COVID-19.

== Privacy and implementation concerns ==
Concerns have been raised amongst patients and the general public about sale of NHS data to private companies.

The Pulse magazine — distributed to general practitioners in the UK — carried articles reflecting concern about the scope of the data being collected and the additional workload and legal risks it would impose on GPs.

Responsibility for informing patients was devolved to GP Practices, for example by updating the Privacy Notice on their website. Doctors urged a delay in introduction due to these concerns.

== Opt out ==
Patients can out of NHS data sharing at two levels: they can ask their GP not to share data with NHS digital for purposes of research and planning, called a Type 1 Opt Out; or they can opt out of NHS Digital sharing - the National Data Opt Out.

The Type 1 Opt Out was implemented by the patient filling out a downloadable paper form and returning it to their GP.

== Implementation delay ==
The process of making GP data available to NHS Digital for wider use was due to begin on 1 July 2021, but was delayed until 1 September.

It has now been delayed until four criteria have been met:

1. The ability to delete data if patients choose to opt-out of sharing their GP data with NHS Digital, even if this is after their data has been uploaded.
2. The backlog of opt-outs has been fully cleared.
3. A Trusted Research Environment has been developed and implemented in NHS Digital.
4. Patients have been made more aware of the scheme through a campaign of engagement and communication.

=== Data security and governance ===
From the GP Data for Planning and Research: Letter from Parliamentary Under Secretary of State for Health and Social Care to general practices in England - 19 July 2021:

The Government has committed that access to GP data will only be via a Trusted Research Environment (TRE) and never copied or shipped outside the NHS secure environment, except where individuals have consented to their data being accessed e.g. written consent for a research study. This is intended to give both GPs and patients a very high degree of confidence that their data will be safe and their privacy protected.

The TRE will be built in line with best practice developed in projects, such as OpenSAFELY and the Office for National Statistics’ Secure Research Service.

We are also committed to adopting a transparent approach, including publishing who has run what query and used which bit of data. We are developing a TRE which will meet our specific needs and act as 'best in class'.

We commit to only begin the data collection once the TRE is in place. Further, we will ensure that the BMA, RCGP and the National Data Guardian have oversight of the proposed arrangements and are satisfied with them before data upload begins.

I can also confirm that the previously published Data Provision Notice for this collection has been withdrawn.

Once the data is collected, it will only be used for the purposes of improving health and care. Patient data is not for sale and will never be for sale.
