= Patient administration system =

Patient Administration Systems (often abbreviated to PAS) developed out of the automation of administrative paperwork in healthcare organisations, particularly hospitals, and are one of the core components of a hospital's IT infrastructure. The PAS records the patient's demographics (e.g. name, home address, date of birth) and details all patient contact with the hospital, both outpatient and inpatient.

PAS systems are often criticised for providing only administrative functionality to hospitals, however attempts to provide more clinical and operational functionality have often been expensive failures.

== History ==
In the UK, IRC PAS was developed at North Staffordshire Health Authority in the late 1960s. It became widely used within the NHS and was supported commercially by ICL. Siemens Nixdorf acquired the PAS in 1996 but dropped support in 1998. The NPfIT project was claimed to have deployed a total 141 new generation PAS by 2008 but this figure had risen to only 170 by 2010.

== Standard PAS Functionality ==
PAS Systems provide a number of core essential functions to hospitals:

1. Master Patient Index
2. Appointment Booking
3. Waiting List Management
4. Record of Patient Activity
5. Activity Returns/Billing
6. Reporting
7. Admission
