= HealthSpace =

The HealthSpace website was operated by the English National Health Service for patients to record blood pressure, blood sugar levels and other medical data. It was also the portal for the patient to view their Summary Care Record and for making hospital appointments. In December 2012 the service was shut down due to lack of interest. In April 2013 all HealthSpace Data was destroyed in order to comply with the Data Protection Act.

HealthSpace name and trademark was subsequently taken by a multi-discipline clinic in Bishops Waltham, Hampshire, SO32 1AJ, UK.
