= Centre for Pharmacy Postgraduate Education =

Coordinates: 53.4643778°N 2.2304468°W

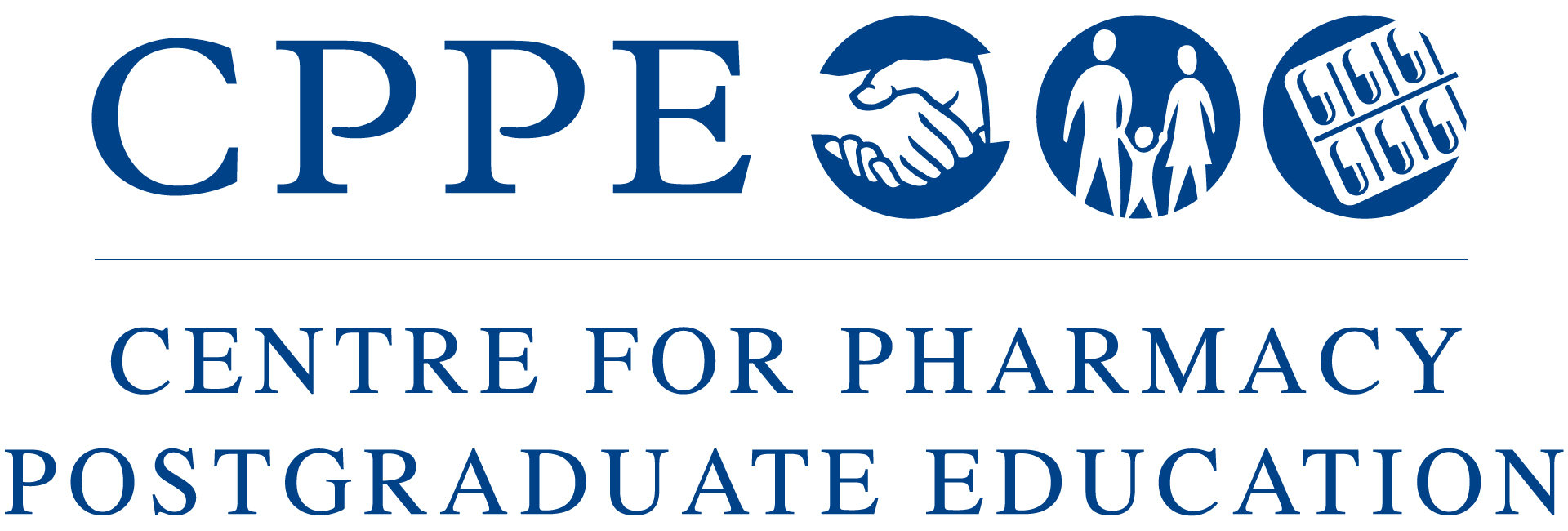
CPPE logo

The Centre for Pharmacy Postgraduate Education (CPPE) is part of the Manchester Pharmacy School, in the University of Manchester, UK. CPPE was created in May 1991 as a direct response to the perceived lack of continuing professional development support given to community pharmacists, as outlined in Section 63 of the Health Services and Public Health Act 1968.

== History ==
The CPPE was originally a partnership between the North West Regional Health Authority and the University of Manchester. The RHA provided the administration support and the University provided academic input. Its funding came directly from the National Health Service. The original head office was based at Gateway House in Manchester, it is now located on the first floor of the University of Manchester's Stopford Building. It began with a mandate to provide free access to continuing professional development resources for community pharmacists. It later included all pharmacists and pharmacy technicians providing services to patients in the NHS in England.

With the dissolution of the regional health authority structures, CPPE became fully part of the University of Manchester in August 1995, operating under an agreement with the NHS Executive: Office of the Chief Pharmacist. All of the administration team moved across to become employees of the University. The original management had members from the Regional Health Authority, the University of Manchester and the Department of Health. The first director was Alison Blenkinsopp, who went on to be Professor of the Practice Pharmacy at Bradford University. Subsequent directors include Ann Lewis (later registrar of RPSGB), Dr Peter Wilson, Professor Peter Noyce (CBE) and Professor Chris Cutts. The director as of 2017 is Dr Matthew Shaw.

The CPPE provides continuing professional development for all registered pharmacy professionals across all sectors of NHS Practice. Its original work programme took the form of workshops and distance learning materials. Workshops, first launched in 1992, were run on a national basis using a network of tutors. By March 1992 65 tutors were employed, later growing to 99. CPPE has continued to expand its learning platform and library of resources. The learning offered covers a number of platforms including online learning, workshops, e-courses and independent study. Since 2014 CPPE has been the NHS England provider of the required learning to work in primary care pharmacy roles. Any pharmacist or pharmacy technician who is employed under the Advanced Role Reimbursement Scheme (ARRS) funding is required to undertake the formal 18 month learning pathway with CPPE. As of November 2025 over 10,000 pharmacists and pharmacy technicians had successfully completed this programme.

In 2006, 15 years after the CPPE was established, the Department of Health embarked on a review which found that it was an effective provider of high-quality learning resources to pharmacists and pharmacy technicians across England, and it considered the CPPE a centre of excellence.. A full procurement exercise was launched in 2025 to secure future provision of learning to support NHS pharmacy professionals across England. The successful bidder is expected to be announced in February 2026.
