= NHS Information Authority =

The NHS Information Authority (NHSIA) was part of the UK National Health Service (NHS). It was established as a NHS special health authority by an Act of Parliament in April 1999. Its aim was to deliver IT infrastructure and information solutions to the NHS in England. To do this it was to bring together four NHS IT and Information bodies: NHS Telecoms, Family Health Service (FHS), NHS Centre for Coding and Classification (CCC) and NHS Information Management Group (IMG)). It had headquarters in Birmingham, UK.

== Programs ==
Among its programmes, products and services were ERDIP, Read Codes, the NHS's contribution to SNOMED development, Pathology Messaging, NHSnet, the NHS-wide private computer network designed to enable NHS bodies to communicate securely, the Exeter system, a suite of computer programs used by Health Authorities for many purposes, NHS Numbers for Babies ("NN4B"), the National electronic Library for Health (NeLH), and NHSmail, an NHS-wide e-mail service known for a short time as 'Contact'. NHSIA was also responsible for overseeing the delivery of the ECDL ("European Computer Driving Licence") qualification to NHS staff via a network of local, internal ECDL test centres.

In 2002, the NHS National Programme for IT (NPfIT) was announced by the Department of Health, initially to work with the NHSIA to deliver the Healthcare IT for the 21st Century white paper. The programme was hosted by the NHSIA.

== Closure ==
In 2004, it was announced that as part of an initiative to cut costs and numbers of Arm's Length Bodies (ALB's), the NHSIA would be abolished and its work would be divided between the National Programme for IT, which would become a unit with the Department of Health known as NHS Connecting for Health, and a newly created Information Centre for Health and Social Care (known as the NHS Information Centre (NHSIC) and since renamed the Health and Social Care Information Centre and trading as NHS Digital (NHSD)).

The NHSIA ceased to exist on 1 April 2005, replaced with the NHS Connecting for Health program and the NHS Information Centre - See NHS Digital.
