= Ground Parachute Extraction System =

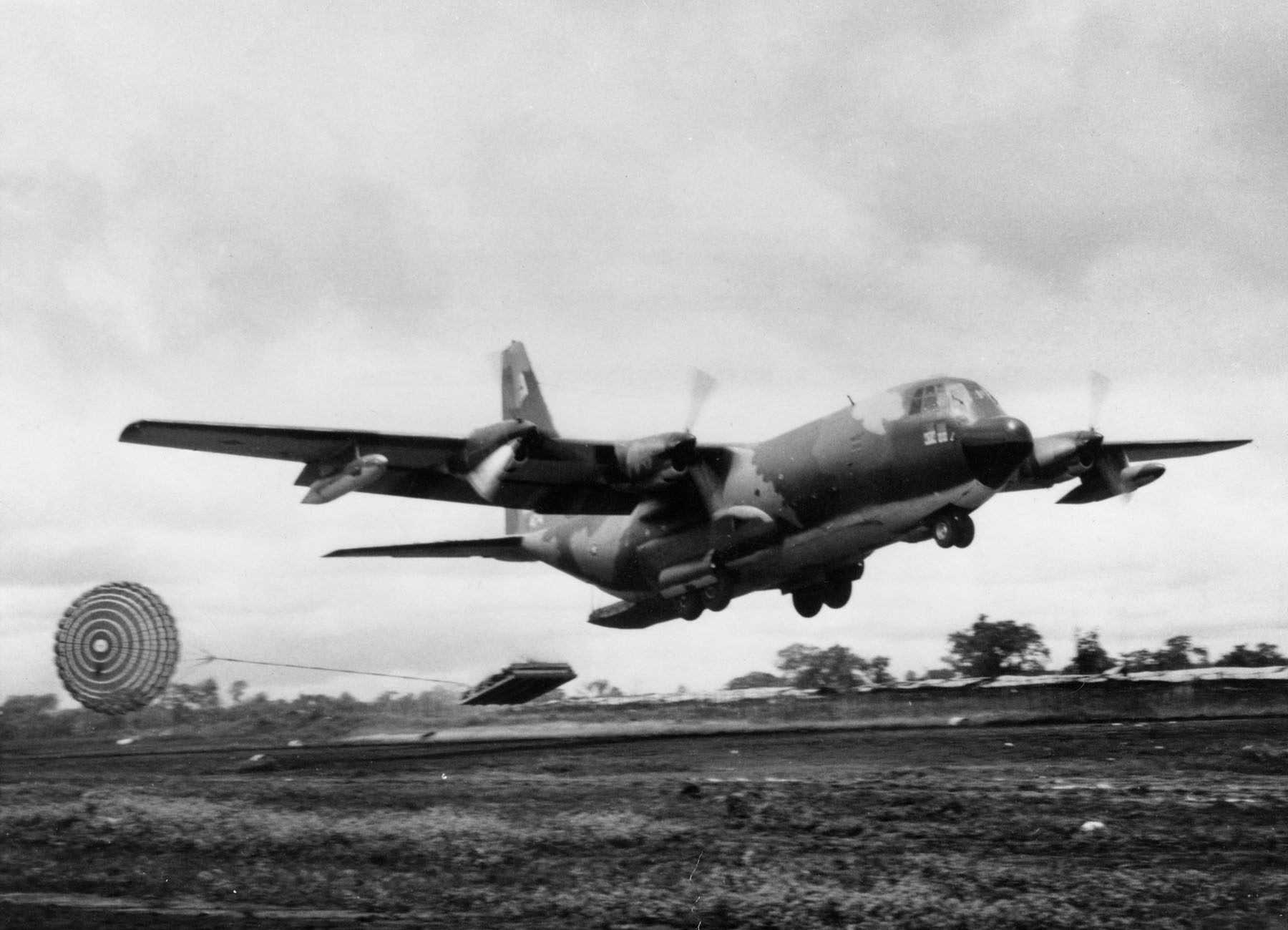
C-130 Hercules demonstrating a LAPES drop at Khe Sanh.

Ground Parachute Extraction System (GPES) refers to a method by which ground forces are resupplied by low altitude air drops. It has also been referred to as Ground Proximity Extraction System. The system, developed jointly by the United States Air Force and Army, is similar to the arrester technique used on aircraft carriers. The cargo aircraft flies low over the delivery area. A hook is attached to the pallet load. Another hook at the other end of the cable line is attached to the rear cargo door. When the plane nears the delivery site, the hook at the cargo door snags an arrester wire that is placed perpendicular to the plane's flight path thereby yanking the pallet load out of the aircraft to the intended delivery site.

== Combat History ==
During the siege of Khe Sanh, the United States went to great lengths to resupply the U.S. Marine garrison stationed there. However, due to PAVN artillery and mortar strikes, landing at the Khe Sanh airstrip became a hazardous endeavor. The GPES delivery system dispensed with the need for aircraft landings thereby greatly reducing exposure to artillery attacks. GPES along with the LAPES delivery system were both employed at Khe Sanh, though the former method was considered more suitable for conditions at Khe Sanh. Both delivery methods entailed risk and required a high degree of crew proficiency and training. Improper delivery could result in damage to the cargo, ground structures and even injury or death to both air crew and ground personnel. After the Vietnam War, GPES was phased out in favor of LAPES, which became the Army's standard delivery system.
