= NHS e-Referral Service =

Electronic referral system developed for the Health and Social Care Information Centre

The NHS e-Referral Service (ERS) is an electronic referral system developed for the Health and Social Care Information Centre by IT consultancy BJSS. It is used by NHS England and it replaced the Choose and Book service on 15 June 2015. The launch of the e-Referral service is intended to be a step towards achieving paperless referrals in the English NHS.

== History ==
The release date was delayed by seven months from that originally announced after it failed an assessment by the Government Digital Service. When released there were 33 ‘known issues". The system went live on Monday 15 Jun 2015, but on 17 June it was shut down and GPs across England resorted to fax machines in order to refer patients. After launch, the system experienced numerous outages in its first weeks. In July 2015 users were advised to switch to Google Chrome in order to reduce the four-minute loading time to 50 seconds. Of the 28 known issues at that date, 23 have a simple workaround that can be used which are published on the website, according to the Health and Social Care Information Centre.

19 Trusts were fully using the system. From October 2018 it is to be used for all out-patient referrals, and it is hoped that this will halve the number of missed appointments and generate savings of at least £50 million.

== Operation ==
The NHS e-Referral Service supports referrals to secondary care by GPs. It allows users to choose the date and time of an appointment.
