= Richard Granger =

British businessman (born 1965)

Richard Granger (born c.1965) is a British management consultant and former UK civil servant who was Director General for the NHS's information technology project, Connecting for Health.

== Early career ==
Granger worked for Andersen Consulting (now Accenture) and in the oil industry. After Andersen he became a partner at Deloitte Consulting. At Deloitte he was responsible for procurement and delivery of a number of large scale IT programmes, including the Congestion Charging Scheme for London.

== NHS ==
In 2002 Granger was appointed Director General of Information at the National Health Service, with responsibility for the NHS IT centralisation scheme, NPfIT (National Programme for IT), later rebadged as NHS Connecting for Health or CfH.

Granger was recognised with a number of awards for his work in the NHS. These included an honorary doctorate in Public Health from Cass Business School, London, Chartered IT Professional status and advancement to Fellowship of the British Computer Society. Granger was a member of the Advisory Panel for the production of the ITGI's COBIT 4.1 IT Governance Guide. On 26 April 2006 Granger was featured extensively in the BBC Programme 'Modern Brunels' regarding the Public Health benefits of more accessible information in the Health sector.

In October 2006, he was suggested by The Sunday Times to be the highest paid civil servant, on a basic of £280,000 per year, £100,000 per year more than then-Prime Minister Tony Blair. Granger announced on 16 June 2007 that he would leave the agency "during the latter part" of 2007. He transitioned out of the role and left CfH in February 2008.

== KPMG ==
After departing the NHS he joined KPMG as a partner in 2008.
