= Global Peace Exchange =

American student exchange organization

- Formation: 2006
- Type: Non-Profit
- Headquarters: Tallahassee, Florida
- Location: Birmingham, Alabama United States
- Key people: Nick Fiore; Maria Kuecken (FSU); Saurav Bhandary; Wesley Chambers (BSC)
- Website: Official website

Global Peace Exchange (GPE) is a program based at Florida State University that coordinates student based exchanges for volunteering and developmental endeavors in countries around the world. The non-profit organization was founded in July 2007 by the co-founders/directors Nick Fiore, Maria Kuecken and Alex Merkovic. It is housed in the Claude Pepper Center for Intercultural Dialogue in Tallahassee, Florida.
