= Choose and Book =

Software application for the NHS in England

Choose and Book was an E-Booking software application for the National Health Service (NHS) in England which enabled patients needing an outpatient appointment to choose which hospital they were referred to by their general practitioner (GP), and to book a convenient date and time for their appointment.

Originally designed simply as an electronic booking system, Choose and Book was developed to enable patient hospital choice. It was introduced into the NHS from 2005 onwards. It was procured as part of the National Programme for IT (NPfIT) in 2003. The contract was awarded to Schlumberger Limited's Sema division just before its acquisition by Atos Origin. The software is based on Cerner Corporation's Millennium e-Booking software.

Surgery where immediate treatment is required is not in the remit of Choose and Book since such patients' needs bypass any longer-term queuing systems.

Choose and Book has been replaced by the NHS e-Referral Service which was to have started in 2014 but was postponed until 2015 after it failed an assessment by the Government Digital Service.

== How Choose and Book works ==
In its fully functional mode, Choose and Book communicated electronically between "compliant" GP Clinical Computer systems and Directly Bookable Hospital Patient Administration Systems (PAS) to enable GPs to shortlist appropriate services for their patients. This enabled patients to either book their appointment at their GP practice, call the national appointments line (originally on 0845 60 88888, and changed to 0345 60 88888 in mid-2010) or book their appointment online through the HealthSpace website. Directly Bookable Services refers to hospitals using Choose and Book compliant PAS systems. In this mode Choose and Book 'harvests' and displays appointment slots directly from the Hospital PAS for users to book directly into.

== Interim Solutions ==
For a number of reasons some GP and hospital PAS systems had not been made compliant in time to deliver the initial Choose and Book targets set by the Department of Health. Interim solutions were devised in 2005/6 to allow patients to benefit from Choose and Book where systems were not compliant.

- Web Based Referral allowed a GP to access Choose and Book via a standard web browser until their Clinical Computing system can be successfully upgraded.
- Indirectly Bookable Services involves telephone call handlers in hospitals to offer appointments to patients. The operator validates the patient's identity, offer a choice of available dates and times from the hospital's patient administration system and updates CaB with details of the patient's chosen appointment.

== Development ==
The roll-out of Choose and Book in 2005 and 2006 suffered a number of delays; some technical because of its dependency on other NPfIT work streams, partly through functional problems in early releases, and partly through clinicians' concerns about additional workload.

There were conflicting views about its effectiveness, both from a technical viewpoint (it is hard to distinguish between bugs in CaB and the systems with which it interfaces) and a service perspective (some users argue that it undermines existing good practice, while others praise the convenience and reduced delays it offers to patients). A 2006 survey (published 2008) found that the majority of patients were not experiencing the degree of choice that the system was designed to deliver.

To increase the uptake of Choose and Book by doctors in England, surgeries were offered a financial incentive for the first part of 2006, but it continued to suffer from adverse publicity in the medical press and resistance from a number of GPs.

As the application became more stable during 2005 and 2006, booking volumes increased, albeit more slowly than planned. At December 2006, over 1.5M patients had used Choose and Book. By the end of October 2008, this had risen to over 10M bookings, with daily figures of over 20,000. All primary care trusts in England were live with Choose and Book (although that might only be one GP within a PCT or practice), while all NHS acute trusts and a large number of independent sector hospitals used Choose and Book. At 28 October 2008, 93% of practices were providing the service, and while some PCTs are only seeing low volumes (30% and less in some cases), many were booking 70 to 80% of patients using Choose and Book.

Use reached a high point nationally of 57% of referrals in the first two months of 2010. As incentive schemes were scaled back there was a drop in use to 50% at the start of 2012. When the system was turned off in June 2015 it was used by 40,000 patients every day.

== Extended Choice Network ==
In January 2007 private Hospitals started making their services directly bookable to GPs whose PCT had commissioned their services. From April 2007, the 'Extended Choice Network' included all NHS foundation trusts and independent sector hospitals accredited by the Department of Health as meeting NHS quality and cost criteria. This meant that a GP could, via CaB, offer their patients the choice of four or more local providers, and the option of any Foundation Trust or accredited independent sector hospital in England. The Government's intention was that when patients were able to choose between their local NHS Hospital and any accredited private hospital in England, standards would rise (known as 'contestability'). In March 2007 the first independent sector hospitals became available as directly bookable options from within Choose and Book.

From April 2008, 'Free Choice' policy meant that patients could choose from any clinically appropriate and accredited provider in England. Since the deployment of Release 4.0 of the application in May 2008, referrers could select from two menus: "Search Primary Care", which only showed services provided by the PCT or by smaller local providers, or "Search All", which showed services provided by all accredited providers in England. One criticism of this policy is that patients and their referring clinicians needed more meaningful information to make a genuinely informed choice, some of which is provided by the NHS website "Find and Choose a Hospital" comparison feature.
