= NHS East of England =

NHS East of England was a strategic health authority of the National Health Service in England. It operated in the East of England region, which is coterminous with the local government office region. The authority closed on 31 March 2013 as part of the Health and Social Care Act 2012.
