= NHS Evidence =

Defunct UK online health information resource

NHS Evidence was a UK health care evidence search service that enabled users to access clinical and non-clinical evidence and best practice information through its web-based portal. Its purpose was to help users within the National Health Service (NHS), public health and social care sectors in decision-making by fostering evidence-based practices. NHS Evidence was managed by the National Institute for Health and Clinical Excellence (NICE). It was created in 2008 and as of 2024 is no longer in operation; NICE directs would-be users to alternate services on its website.

== Origins ==
The service was created as part of a broader initiative by the government of Prime Minister Gordon Brown "to improve quality of care" provided by the National Health Services (NHS) to the public. It was established in April 2009 as part of Parliamentary Under Secretary of State Lord Darzi's strategy report on the future of the NHS commissioned by the Brown government, entitled "High-Quality Care for All". In his report, Darzi identified the need for better information access to improve services.

== Capabilities ==
NHS Evidence allowed users to search over 100 health and social care databases simultaneously, including The Cochrane Library, the British National Formulary and the National Institute for Health and Clinical Excellence. Users could search in clinical areas and in demographic and policy subjects, including topics related to inequalities in services available to different population groups.

Its budget in 2009/2010 was £19,433,000. In 2010/2011, it was £24,438,000.

== Resources ==
Information available via NHS Evidence included clinical and public health guidance, government policy, patient data, pharmacological data, systematic reviews, primary research, and grey literature.

There were six 'lots', or categories, of data available as defined by NICE, organized by type of source. These categories were: 1) print journals; 2) electronic journals; 3) print books; 4) electronic books; 5) databases; and 6) aggregated evidence summaries. Source providers were as follows: 123Doc; BMJ; Wiley-Blackwell; Coutts; Dawson; EBSCO; Oxford University Press; Ovid; Pharmaceutical Press; ProQuest; Tomlinsons; and Waterstone.

== NICE ==
The acronym "NICE" refers to the National Institute for Health and Clinical Excellence, a special health authority that was initially responsible for maintaining the evidence search service. Following the Health and Social Care Act 2012, NICE was renamed the National Institute for Health and Care Excellence and changed from a special health authority to an executive non-departmental public body. NICE International was established in 2008 to help cultivate links with foreign governments and universities in the UK and abroad. NICE International has received financial support from the Bill & Melinda Gates Foundation and Rockefeller Foundation. Part of its process involves the publication of case studies.

== See also ==
The Norwegian Electronic Health Library (Helsebiblioteket.no) is a similar public website for health professionals and students.
