= Sarah Wilkinson =

English healthcare executive

Chief Executive of NHS Digital
- In office August 2017 – 2021
- Preceded by: Andy Williams

Personal details
- Education: Imperial College London; London Business School

Sarah Wilkinson is the former chief executive of NHS Digital, which is an executive non-departmental public body of the Department of Health and Social Care, and part of the NHS in England.

Wilkinson has been named as the second most influential woman working in technology in the UK by Computer Weekly, as well as being named as Chief Digital Officer of the year for 2017 by the CDO club. On her appointment to NHS Digital, she also made her first entry in the Health Service Journal HSJ100 list, entering at number 80. Wilkinson resigned from her role as NHS Digital chief executive in March 2021.

== Work history ==
Before joining NHS Digital, Wilkinson worked as Chief Information Officer at the Home Office.

Prior to this, she held various roles with financial organisations including Credit Suisse, UBS, Deutsche Bank, and Lehman Brothers.

In March 2021, Wilkinson announced her resignation from NHS Digital as Chief Executive Officer after four years of service. She was replaced by Simon Bolton.
