= Enterprise master patient index =

Patient database used by healthcare organizations

An enterprise master patient index or enterprise-wide master patient index (EMPI) is a patient database used by healthcare organizations to maintain accurate medical data across its various departments. Patients are assigned a unique identifier, so they are represented only once across all the organization's systems. Patient data can include name; gender; date of birth; race and ethnicity; social security number; current address and contact information; insurance information; current diagnoses; and most recent date of hospital admission and discharge (if applicable).

EMPIs are intended to ensure patient data is correct and consistent throughout the organization regardless of which system is being updated. Non-healthcare organizations also face similar issues maintaining customer records across different departments.

Many software vendors use the terms EMPI and MPI (master patient index) synonymously, because an MPI is only workable if it is used by all software applications across an entire enterprise; that is, "master" implies enterprise-wide scope.

EMPIs use match engines along with the technique of referential matching to more easily identify duplicate patient records.

== Overview ==
In computing, an enterprise[-wide] master patient index is a form of customer data integration (CDI) specific to the healthcare industry. Healthcare organizations and groups use EMPI to identify, match, merge, de-duplicate, and cleanse patient records to create a master index that may be used to obtain a complete and single view of a patient. The EMPI will create a unique identifier for each patient and maintain a mapping to the identifiers used in each records' respective system.

An EMPI will typically provide an application programming interface (API) for searching and querying the index to find patients and the pointers to their identifiers and records in the respective systems. It may also store some subset of the attributes for the patient so that it may be queried as an authoritative source of the "single most accurate record" or "source of truth" for the patient. Registration or other practice management applications may interact with the index when admitting new patients to have the single best record from the start, or may have the records indexed at a later time.

An EMPI may additionally work with or include enterprise application integration (EAI) capabilities to update the originating source systems of the patient records with the cleansed and authoritative data.

Even the best tuned EMPI will not be 100% accurate. Thus an EMPI will provide a data stewardship interface for reviewing the match engine results, handling records for which the engine does not definitively determine a match or not. This interface will provide for performing search, merge, unmerge, edit and numerous other operations. This interface may also be used to monitor the performance of the match engine and perform periodic audits on the quality of the data.

EMPI can be used by organizations such as hospitals, medical centers, outpatient clinics, physician offices and rehabilitation facilities.

=== Match engine ===
A component of an EMPI is the match engine, the method by which different records can be identified as being for the same patient. A match engine may be deterministic, probabilistic, or naturalistic. The match engine must be configured and tuned for each implementation to minimize false matches and unmatches. The accuracy and performance of the match engine are a big factor in determining the value and ROI for an EMPI solution.

The attributes a match engine is configured to use can typically include name, date of birth, sex, social security number, and address. The match engine must be able to give consideration to data challenges such as typos, misspellings, transpositions and aliases.

==== Referential matching ====
Referential matching involves taking third party patient demographic data containing unique identifiers and using it to better match patient records. Rather than compare incomplete records with each other to try to match them, the organization would compare each incomplete record with a more comprehensive referential database. This works across multiple organizations as long as they all use the same referential list of demographic data formatted the same way. Putting the EMPI on the cloud is one technique to ensure uniformity of the match engine. In 2018, Pennsylvania-based NGO The Pew Charitable Trusts identified referential matching using third party patient data as a good way to improve patient matching.

== Key benefits ==
Correctly matching patient records from disparate systems and different organizations provides a more complete view of a patient. Additional benefits include:

- Better patient care can be provided.
- Improved customer service can be offered.
- In emergency or other critical care situations, medical staff can be more confident that they know medical conditions or other information that would be critical to providing proper care.
- Historical care related information can be obtained from across organizations.
