= Quality and Outcomes Framework =

Aspect of the British healthcare system

The Quality and Outcomes Framework (QOF) is a system for the performance management and payment of general practitioners (GPs) in the National Health Service (NHS) in England, Wales, Scotland and Northern Ireland. It was introduced as part of a new general medical services (GMS) contract in April 2004, replacing various other fee arrangements.

== Aims and mechanisms ==
The QOF was part of a revised contract for GPs. It was intended to improve the quality of general practice and was part of an effort to solve a shortage of GPs. The QOF rewards GPs for implementing "good practice" in their surgeries. Participation in the QOF is voluntary for each partnership, but for most GPs, under the present contract, the QOF is almost the only area where they can make a difference to their income. Almost all participated. Most practices got, and still get, a significant proportion of their income through the QOF.

In the 2004 contract the practice could accumulate up to 1050 'QOF points', depending on level of achievement for each of the 146 indicators. The criteria are grouped into 4 domains: clinical, organisational, patient experience and additional services. The criteria are designed around best practice and have a number of points allocated for achievement. At the end of the financial year the total number of points achieved by a surgery is collated by the QMAS or other system which then converts the points total into a payment amount for the surgery. The formula includes the number of patients and in particular the numbers diagnosed with certain common chronic illnesses; the clinical element awards points for achieving specified clinical "indicators".

A typical clinical indicator would be the proportion of patients with coronary heart disease who had cholesterol measured in the financial year, or the number of patients with depression who have answered a standard questionnaire on severity. Organisational indicators include such things as the availability of practice leaflets and practice staff education.

In the organisational domain the value of points was proportional to the number of patients registered with the practice. In the clinical domain the value of points was further modified by the prevalence of that condition in the practice – this was measured as the square root of the ratio of the national prevalence. For a typical practice the payment was £77.50 per point in 2004/5 and £124.60 in subsequent years.

The QOF system is supervised and audited by NHS primary care trusts in England and the analogous bodies elsewhere in the UK (Health Boards in Scotland, Regional Boards in Northern Ireland and Local Health Boards in Wales), which make the related payments.

== Changes to the framework ==
The GMS contract was revised in April 2006 and, in particular, the QOF was adjusted. The clinical domain was extended from 11 to 18 areas and 138 points were reassigned. The total number of points was reduced to 1000 and the 50 points that were previously attainable through "access points" are now folded into an "access" Directed Enhanced Service (DES). The clinical areas now include coronary heart disease, heart failure, stroke and transient ischaemic attacks, hypertension, diabetes mellitus, chronic obstructive pulmonary disease, epilepsy, hypothyroidism, cancer, palliative care, mental health and asthma. Added in 2006 were dementia, depression, chronic kidney disease, atrial fibrillation, obesity, learning disabilities and smoking.

QOF version 10 was introduced in July/August 2007, with mainly minor changes to the system, removing, adding or changing codes in the clinical areas to bring them in line with current guidance or to fix typing errors.

Further changes to the QOF for 2008 included the addition of new indicators for COPD and smoking cessation. Points have been removed from the access and patient experience domains.

Further changes have occurred on an annual basis although no changes took place for the 2010-11 year for all practices to deal with Swine Flu.

New indicators are developed and approved by a committee of the National Institute for Health and Clinical Excellence. Approved indicators are presented as a "menu" which is passed to the contract negotiators. In the past year only a minority of the indicators in the menu have actually been put into the framework.

QMAS was replaced by the Calculating Quality Reporting Service (CQRS) in 2013.

== Exception reporting ==
The level of achievement recorded depends on the GP treating the patients with the relevant problem(s). But not all patients are treatable or willing to be treated. In order for the GPs not to lose points on account of circumstances that are outside their control they can exclude those patients from counting towards their achievement by "exception reporting" them. Exception reporting is allowed for:

- patients who refuse to attend;
- patients for whom chronic disease reporting is inappropriate (e.g. terminal illness, extreme frailty);
- newly diagnosed or recently registered patients;
- patients who do not show improvement;
- patients for whom prescribing a medication is not clinically appropriate;
- patients not tolerating medication;
- patients refusing investigation or treatment (informed dissent);
- patients with supervening conditions;
- cases where diagnostic/secondary care service is unavailable.

Practices in Scotland have been found to use exception reporting appropriately in that patients who were older or who had dementia were more likely to have been "exception reported". However, younger or more socio-economically deprived patients were more likely to be recorded as having refused to attend for review or not replying to letters asking for attendance at primary care clinics. It has therefore been highlighted that primary care practices should identify and monitor these individuals (i.e. the youngest and most deprived with cardiovascular disease) so that all patients fully benefit from the implementation of the new GMS contract and receive appropriate clinical care to prevent further disability and mortality.

== Advantages and disadvantages ==
Assessments of its success are mixed. The new GP contract as a whole cost £1.76 billion more than the Government had expected, mainly because GPs had been expected to achieve 75% of the available points in the first year and actually achieved 90%.

Tim Burr, head of the National Audit Office, said in 2008: "There is no doubt that a new contract was needed and there are now 4,000 more GPs than five years ago. But in return for higher pay, we have yet to see real increases in productivity."

However, substantial improvements have been noted, particularly in the maintenance of disease registries and screening of risk factors for older patients with cardiovascular disease in the community.

Ben Bradshaw, the Health Minister said: "The GP contract… has stemmed the haemorrhaging of GPs from the NHS and improved the quality of care for the public. Longer consultations, quicker appointments and being able to book ahead are improvements valued by patients."

Laurence Buckman, chairman of the BMA's GP committee, said "The early evidence is that the contract is leading to improvements in clinical care".

A 2016 study published in the Lancet assessed the effect of QOF on mortality. It found that the QOF had no effect on mortality.

== Data collection ==
NHS Digital collects and publishes an annual report using QOF data. As this information is linked to funding GP Practices take a good deal of trouble over it and it enables direct comparisons between practices across England. Data about disease registers and achievement indicators have been collected at the end of March annually since 2004. There are no patient based links, as information about each indicator is collected separately, but it is possible to combine information from different practices to generate area data.

== Local alternatives ==
In June 2014, NHS England approved a local alternative to the framework for practices in Somerset. Under the Somerset Practice Quality Scheme agreement practices that choose to take part only have to formally report against five of the indicators in the 2014–15 QOF. Clinical commissioning groups in Thanet and in York also asked permission to develop a local alternative but were refused.

In January 2017, the clinical commissioning groups in Leeds agreed to suspend 80% of the QOF targets for the rest of 2016/17. A similar strategy has already been adopted by NHS Wales.
