= NHS Digital =

Former UK government agency

Non-departmental public body overview
- Formed: 1 April 2013 (13 years ago)
- Preceding agencies: NHS Connecting for Health; NHS Information Centre
- Dissolved: 31 January 2023
- Superseding Non-departmental public body: NHS England
- Jurisdiction: England
- Headquarters: Leeds, England
- Motto: Information and technology for better health and care
- Parent department: Department of Health and Social Care
- Website: digital.nhs.uk

NHS Digital, previously the Health and Social Care Information Centre, was the national provider of information, data and IT systems for commissioners, analysts and clinicians in health and social care in England, particularly those involved with the National Health Service of England. The organisation was an executive non-departmental public body of the Department of Health and Social Care, until it was merged into NHS England in 2023.

== Role ==
NHS Digital provided digital services for the NHS and social care, including the management of large health informatics programmes. They delivered national systems through in-house teams, and by contracting private suppliers. These services included managing patient data including the Spine, which allows the secure sharing of information between different parts of the NHS, and forms the basis of the Electronic Prescription Service, Summary Care Record and Electronic Referral Service.

NHS Digital took on the roles of a number of predecessor bodies including the NHS Information Centre, NHS Connecting for Health, and parts of NHS Direct. It also ran "The NHS Website" (www.nhs.uk, formerly NHS Choices), the national website for the NHS in England.

NHS Digital was the national collator of information about health and social care, and produced more than 260 official statistics and national statistical publications. This included national comparative data for secondary uses, developed from the long-running Hospital Episode Statistics to help local decision-makers improve the quality and efficiency of frontline care.

== History ==
The organisation was created as a special health authority on 1 April 2005 by a merger of the National Programme for IT, part of the Department of Health, the NHS Information Authority, and the Prescribing Support Unit.

Following the Health and Social Care Act 2012, the HSCIC changed from a special health authority to an executive non-departmental public body on 1 April 2013. Effective at this time, HSCIC took over parts of the troubled NHS National Programme for IT from the agency NHS Connecting for Health (CfH) which ceased to exist. It also ran the Health Survey for England.

On 20 April 2016, it was announced that HSCIC would be rebranding, changing its name to NHS Digital in July 2016.

NHSX, created in February 2019, had oversight of digital strategy and policy in NHS England. As a budget-holder, NHSX commissioned projects from NHS Digital. On 22 November 2021, it was announced that NHS Digital would be merged with NHSX and incorporated into NHS England. The merger was completed on 1 February 2023.

== Business areas ==
=== Handling patient data ===
NHS Digital ran the Spine service for the NHS, which is a central, secure system for patient data in England. This enables a number of services for patients, including:

- the Electronic Prescription Service, which sends prescriptions digitally from GP surgeries and other NHS providers to pharmacies, without needing a printed prescription.
- the Summary Care Record which allows authorised NHS staff (such as hospital or ambulance staff) to see a summary of important information about a patient, to help give the best care.
- the e-referral service which manages the booking of first time appointments with hospitals and specialists.
- the Child Protection - Information Sharing system, which helps ensure that any child protection concerns are known by the NHS when they are treated.

As the HSCIC, the organisation ran the care.data programme, which was cancelled in 2016.

NHS Digital collected the national 'Hospital Episode Statistics' (HES), which is a record of every 'episode' of admitted patient care (counted by completing care with a consultant, meaning that more than one episode can be associated with a single stay in hospital) delivered by the NHS in England, including those done under contract by private providers. This involves the tracking of around 16 million 'episodes' of care every year. This information is used for a range of statistical analysis, as well as for determining payments to providers. In addition to admitted patient care, HES also provides data for outpatient and emergency care encounters. The Emergency Care Data Set has been created to replace HES A&E data and provide better data on emergency care encounters.

In November 2019 it launched the National Record Locator, which spans different health economies and is intended to enable paramedics, community mental health nurses, children's health teams and maternity services to access the records of mental health patients across England.

In August 2020 it launched a pilot electronic prescription service in three hospital trusts, where hospital prescriptions were sent electronically to the patient's community pharmacy, as during the COVID-19 pandemic in England most outpatient consultations were held remotely.

=== Central technology team ===
A troubleshooting operation was established in 2018 to help NHS trusts when major IT deployments go wrong. Eight trusts needed emergency assistance in 2018 after a deployment led to severe service disruptions. Funding of £2 million a year for the service has been allocated and expansion is expected.

=== Statistics and data ===
NHS Digital compiled national data about the NHS and social care, with over 260 publications every year. In addition, they provided data analysis, and access to data and clinical indicators.

=== Public-facing services ===
The NHS website www.nhs.uk, formerly NHS Choices, is the public website for the NHS Services in England, and was run by a team at NHS Digital, mandated by DOH with input from Public Health England. In November 2022 it had been visited more than one billion times in the previous 12 months.

== Leadership ==
Simon Bolton, formerly chief information officer at Jaguar Land Rover and NHS Test and Trace, was appointed as interim chief executive officer in June 2021. He replaced Sarah Wilkinson, CEO from August 2017 until she decided to step down in March 2021.

== See also ==
- Healthcare Resource Group
