= Direct care =

Care by a clinical professional in the UK NHS

Direct care is the care of an identified patient by an identified clinical professional, used throughout the National Health Service in the United Kingdom.

In late 2023, it became the focus of the first public uses of the NHS purchase of Palantir software.,,,,

== Definition ==
The Second Caldicott Report, chaired by Dame Fiona Caldicott, defined direct care as:

A clinical, social or public health activity concerned with the prevention, investigation and treatment of illness and the alleviation of suffering of an identified individual. It includes supporting individuals’ ability to function and improve their participation in life and society. It includes the assurance of safe and high quality care and treatment through local audit (identified patient safety), the management of untoward or adverse incidents.

— Dame Fiona Caldicott, Report on the review of patient-identifiable information

There is no consensus on whether the definition should include measures of person satisfaction including measurement of outcomes undertaken by one or more registered and regulated health or social care professionals and their team with whom the individual has a legitimate relationship for their care. Such considerations may come under individual audit mechanisms, however healthcare systems may seek wider access for the purposes of their bureaucracy.

Direct Care is contrasted with Secondary Uses, which are all other uses of medical records, usually as bulk personal datasets, some of which have been the source of international controversy. Examples of secondary uses include health care analytics, risk stratification, medical research, and pharmaceutical marketing. Uses of health care records without patient consent are controversial.

== Direct care in nursing ==
In nursing, direct care of a patient is provided personally by a staff member. Direct patient care may involve any aspects of the health care of a patient, including treatments, counselling, self-care, patient education and administration of medication.

== Limitations of audit ==
In the second report for the Department of Health, Fiona Caldicott wrote that:

The use of personal confidential data for local clinical audit is permissible within an organisation with the participation of a health and social care professional with a legitimate relationship to the patient through implied consent. For audit across organisations, the use of personal confidential data is permissible... where approved."

— Dame Fiona Caldicott, The Information Governance Review

== See also ==
- Shared care
- Caldicott Report
- Fiona Caldicott
