= Health Data Insight =

English-based social enterprise

Health Data Insight (HDI) CiC is a social enterprise (community interest company), that researches and data mines NHS England figures to find population health and epidemiological or demographic insights for effective NHS treatments by public health informatics, headquartered in the east of Cambridge.

== History ==
It was founded on 11 July 2011 at Anglia House in Cambridge. Collecting anonymous data from the NHS was allowed under the National Health Service Act 2006. Patient data has a Caldicott guardian, from the Caldicott Report.

It works in conjunction with QuintilesIMS (QI) and AstraZeneca (AZ). It is also involved in a project with IQVIA using Public Health England’s Cancer Analysis System. It works with AstraZeneca and IQVIA, to produce a data pool of synthetic cancer data modeled on actual patient data collected by the National Cancer Registration and Analysis Service.

== Function ==
Within HDI, there are several individual data mining projects.

The Simulacrum, launched in 2018, is a database containing artificial data for use in oncology research.

It studies longitudinal or panel data, over time. Data mining is carried out with software from companies such as SAS.

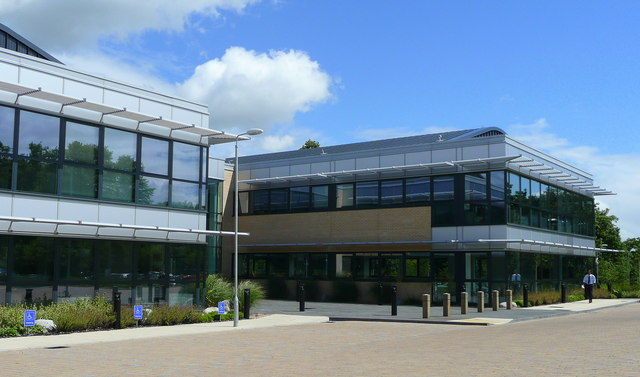
Offices in Capital Park in Fulbourn

== Structure ==
It is sited on Capital Park in the same building (CPC4) as Syngenta UK (former Zeneca then ICI) near the eastern edge of Cambridge in Fulbourn, South Cambridgeshire. The site is also known as Fulbourn Technology Park. It is just south of the boundary with Teversham and the main east–west railway line. Health Education England have an office to the south, as does the National Cancer Registration and Analysis Service (NCRAS) with whom it works, which is funded by Public Health England (PHE).

== See also ==
- National Cancer Intelligence Network (UK)
- NHS Digital, the former Information Centre for Health and Social Care (UK)
- PatientsLikeMe (USA)
- Category:Public health and biosurveillance software
