= Harry Cayton =

William Henry Rymer "Harry" Cayton (born March 1950) is a British regulatory consultant based in Canada. Described as "a committed internationalist", Cayton works as an advisor on professional regulation and governance. He is a senior advisor for The Regulator's Practice and a member of the oversight board for the Journal of Medical Regulation, a publication of the Federation of State Medical Boards (FSMB).

== History ==
Cayton holds a Bachelor of Arts in English and linguistics from the University of Ulster, a diploma in anthropology from the University of Durham, and a Bachelor of Philosophy in education from Newcastle University.

=== Career ===
From 1981 to 1991, Cayton served as director of the National Deaf Children's Society. He was chief executive of the Alzheimer's Society from 1991 to 2003, and director of Deafness Research UK from sometime prior to 1992 until May 31, 2005. He was awarded the Order of the British Empire (OBE) on December 30, 2000, for his work for people with dementia.

From 2002 to 2007, Cayton served as National Director for Patients and the Public at the National Health Service in the United Kingdom. He received the Alzheimer Europe Award in 2004.

In September 2004, Cayton was announced as the chair of the Care Record Development Board (CRDB). He also served as chair of the Expert Group on the Regulation of Cosmetic Surgery within the UK Department of Health.

Cayton was a Distinguished Graduate of Ulster University in 2005. He was made a director of Comic Relief on July 20, 2005. He served as chair of the Arts Council England Working Group on Arts in Health in 2006.

In 2007, he received a Lifetime Achievement Award from the Royal College of Psychiatrists and a Fellowship through Distinction from the Royal College of Physicians' Faculty of Public Health. He was then appointed as chief executive of the Council for Healthcare Regulatory Excellence (CHRE), later renamed to Professional Standards Authority for Health and Social Care, in August 2007, serving until 2018.

On June 12, 2008, Cayton was appointed as the chief executive for the Dr Foster Ethics Committee. He resigned December 31, 2008. In November 2008, Cayton was announced as the founding chair of the National Information Governance Board for Health and Social Care (NIGB). He was succeeded by Fiona Caldicott in June 2011.

In 2010–2011, Cayton chaired the Royal College of Physicians Working Party on Access to Medicines. From 2011 to 2013, Cayton served as a member of the World Economic Forum's Global Agenda Council on Digital Health. He was listed in the acknowledgements of a 2013 report titled "Sustainable Health Systems Visions, Strategies, Critical Uncertainties and Scenarios" co-published by the WEF and McKinsey & Company.

He received the 2016 International Leadership Award from the World Health Executive Forum.

=== Cayton Report ===
In May 2018, was hired by the Government of British Columbia through the Ministry of Health to conduct an inquiry into the administration and operation of the College of Dental Surgeons of British Columbia, on the request of provincial health minister Adrian Dix. Cayton submitted the report on December 21, 2018. The Ministry published the "Cayton Report" in April 2019.

Cayton resigned from his position as director of Comic Relief on November 6, 2019.

=== COVID-19 ===
On August 12, 2020, Thentia announced it had appointed Cayton to its board of directors.

Cayton delivered a presentation to the Law Society of British Columbia (LSBC)'s Governance Committee in August 2020, to whom he gave "a thought provoking and candid assessment" of several of BC's regulatory bodies. He then presented to the LSBC benchers at their October 30, 2020 meeting, where he "spoke about the effect of COVID-19 on regulatory bodies, as well as other areas of change that will affect regulatory bodies, including the #metoo movement, the Black Lives Matter movement, the effects of climate change, economic and political tensions, digital developments and artificial intelligence, and the potential recurrence of future pandemics."

On July 19, 2021, the Law Society of British Columbia announced it had appointed Cayton to "conduct an independent review" examining "the Society’s governance structure, how it assists or inhibits the delivery of the legal regulator’s core purpose and statutory functions, how it enables and supports equity, diversity, and inclusion, and whether it achieves best practice in regulatory governance." Cayton submitted a report on his review on November 25, 2021.

On June 16, 2025, Jordan Peterson revealed in an op-ed published by the National Post that Cayton had been selected by the College of Psychologists and Behaviour Analysts of Ontario to administer a 2-hour coaching session after Peterson was disciplined for social media posts challenging a number of contentious social issues.
