= 1862 in sports =

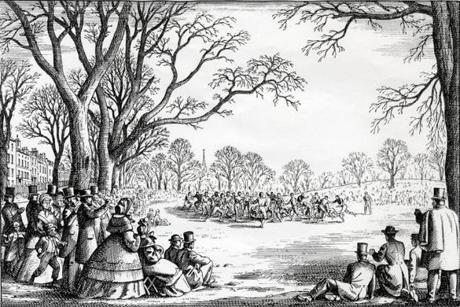
Women in crinolines and men in stove pipe hats watch a group of men in athletic dress playing football on a playing field

1862 in sports describes the year's events in world sport.

== Baseball ==
National championship

- National Association of Base Ball Players champion – Brooklyn Eckfords

Events

- National Association membership drops from 55 to 33 clubs, shedding every one outside greater New York except the Victory club of Troy, which plays only local matches.
- Death of Jim Creighton, aged just 21 and the sport's first great player, perhaps from organ damage sustained on the field. A memorial is established at Green-Wood Cemetery.

== Boxing ==
Events

- Joe Coburn challenges John C. Heenan for the American Championship. Heenan refuses to fight and Coburn claims the title.
- 28 January — Jem Mace successfully defends his British Championship against Tom King, winning in the 43rd round.
- 26 November — Tom King becomes British Champion after defeating Jem Mace at Medway in the 21st round.

== Cricket ==
Events

- 26 August — Surrey v. All-England Eleven at The Oval. Edgar Willsher of All-England is no-balled six times in succession by John Lillywhite for bowling with his hand above the shoulder. For some years previously, Willsher and others have bowled in this way and the incident at The Oval puts the issue into context. The drama is exaggerated when Willsher and the other eight professionals in the England team walk off the field. Play continues next day but with a replacement umpire.

England

- Most runs – Thomas Hayward 661 @ 31.47 (HS 117)
- Most wickets – George Tarrant 96 @ 10.07 (BB 8–16)

== Football ==
Events

- An impromptu team formed in Nottingham around this time is understood to have been the original Notts County. Although County will be formally constituted in December 1864, the club will celebrate its centenary in 1962.
- Invention of the India rubber bladder enables the modern ball to be created with the bladder inside a hard outer casing, at first made of leather. During the days of "mob football", the ball in an organised game had often been an inflated pig's bladder but in fact it could have been made of any material (for example, tin can football is still played now) with no rules about its size either. In certain games that were somewhat less civilised, such as among soldiers after a battle, human skulls are known to have been used.
- 15 October - Two units of the British Army stationed in Montreal play the first written account of Canadian football.
- 29 December — Bramall Lane, which opened as a cricket ground in 1855, hosts its first football match between Sheffield F.C. and Hallam F.C. under Sheffield Rules. Bramall Lane will become the home of first Sheffield Wednesday (1867–1887) and then of Sheffield United from 1889. It is the oldest stadium in the world that stages professional football matches.

== Golf ==
Major tournaments

- British Open – Tom Morris senior

== Horse racing ==
England

- Grand National – The Huntsman
- 1,000 Guineas Stakes – Hurricane
- 2,000 Guineas Stakes – The Marquis
- The Derby – Caractacus
- The Oaks – Feu de Joie
- St. Leger Stakes – The Marquis

Australia

- Melbourne Cup – Archer (second successive title)

Canada

- Queen's Plate – Palermo

== Rowing ==
The Boat Race

- 12 April — Oxford wins the 19th Oxford and Cambridge Boat Race

== Ski jumping ==
Events

- First recorded competition held in Trysil Municipality, Norway
