= Fulbourn Fen =

Nature reserve in Cambridgeshire, England

Coordinates: 52.181°N 0.236°E

- Site of Special Scientific Interest
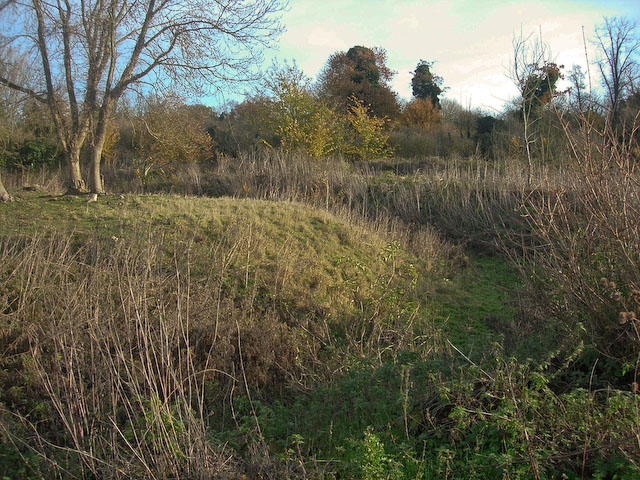
- Moat of the former Zouches Castle
- Location of Fulbourn Fen.
- Area of search: Cambridgeshire
- Grid reference: TL 530 561
- Interest: Biological
- Area: 27.3 hectares
- Notification date: 1986
- Location map: Magic Map

Fulbourn Fen is a 27.3-hectare (67-acre) biological Site of Special Scientific Interest east of Fulbourn, Cambridgeshire. It is privately owned and managed by the Wildlife Trust for Bedfordshire, Cambridgeshire and Northamptonshire.

There are ancient meadows on calcareous loam and peat which have never been intensively farmed, so they have a rich diversity of flora and fauna. Herbs in drier areas include cowslip and salad burnet, while wetter areas have tall fen vegetation.

There is access by a track from Stonebridge Lane.

There are eight separately named woods in Fulbourn Fen:

1. The Cringles - north & north-east
2. Moat Wood - north-west
3. Thackets Wood - west
4. Ansett's Wood - south-west
5. Old Orchard - south
6. Hancock's Wood - central
7. Widow's Wood - south-east
8. Old Orchard - south

and five separate meadows:

1. Ox Meadow - west
2. Moat Meadow - north-west - the site of the remains of Zouches Manor
3. Long Fen Pasture - central
4. East Fen Pasture - east
5. Four Acre - south-east

== Zouches Manor ==
Fulbourn Fen contains the moated remains of a Saxon manor known as Zouches Manor and then Dunmowes Manor. It was one of the Five Manors of Fulbourn and was built by Alan la Zouche, Earl of Brittany (the same family that held Ashby-de-la-Zouch in Leicestershire).
