= Fulbourn Manor =

Manor house in Cambridgeshire, England

Coordinates: 52.182631°N 0.223436°E

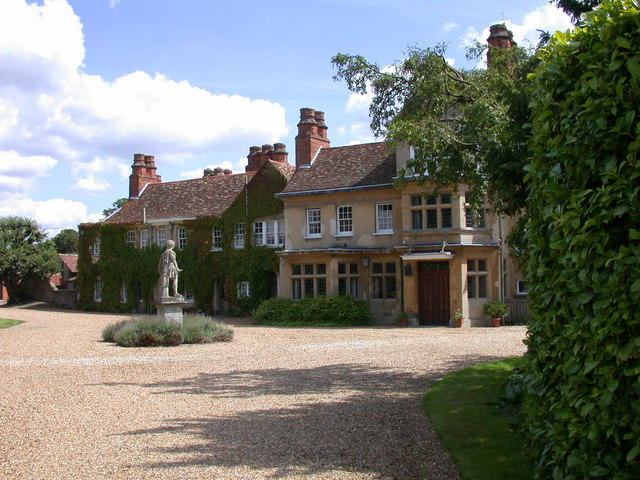

Fulbourn Manor is a Grade II listed building in the English county of Cambridgeshire and the sole surviving manor of the Five Manors of Fulbourn.

== History ==
The manor was built in 1788 or maybe earlier. An account from 1495 states that Richard Berkeley and his wife Anne Berkeley settled a debt of 1,000 marks with four manors of Fulbourn, which were stated as Zouches, Manners, Shardelowes and Fulbourn.

It was largely rebuilt around 1910 by Dudley Newman. Reconstruction preserved part of the 18th-century building.
