= Fulbourn =

Village in Cambridgeshire, England

Coordinates: 52.183951°N 0.227244°E

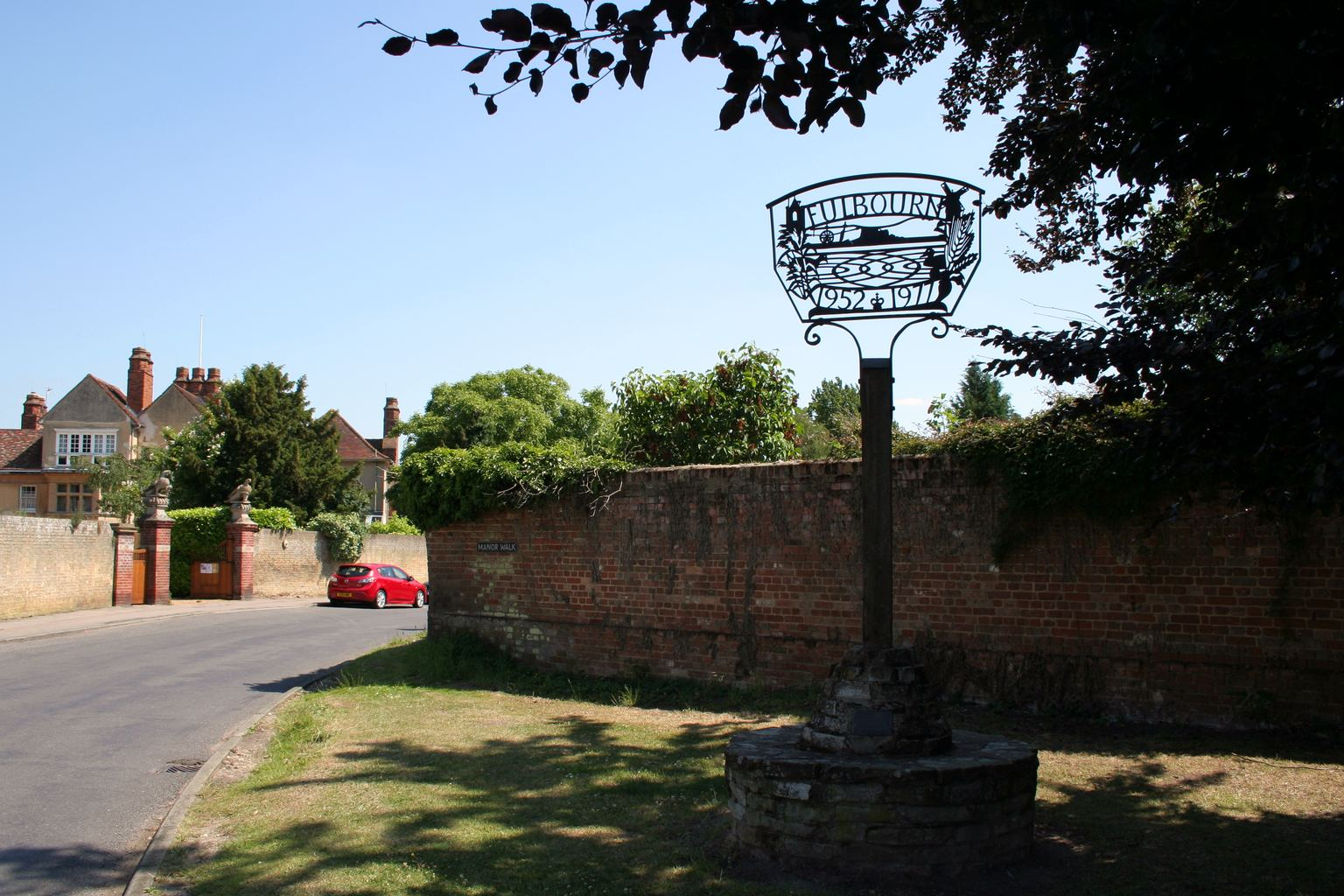
- Fulbourn village sign

- Location within Cambridgeshire
- Population: 4,673 (2011)
- OS grid reference: TL522563
- Civil parish: Fulbourn
- District: South Cambridgeshire
- Shire county: Cambridgeshire
- Region: East
- Country: England
- Sovereign state: United Kingdom
- Post town: CAMBRIDGE
- Postcode district: CB21
- Dialling code: 01223
- Police: Cambridgeshire
- Fire: Cambridgeshire
- Ambulance: East of England
- UK Parliament: South East Cambridgeshire

Fulbourn is a village in Cambridgeshire, England, with evidence of settlement dating back to Neolithic times. The village was probably established under its current name by 1200. The waterfowl-frequented stream after which it was named lies in the east, close to the division between arable and fenland.

== Geography ==
Fulbourn lies about five miles (8 km) southeast of the centre of Cambridge, separated from the outer city boundary by farmland and the grounds of Fulbourn Hospital. The village itself is fairly compact and roughly in the centre of the administrative parish. North and east of the village the land is flat, drained fen; to the south and southwest the Gog Magog Hills rise to over 200 feet (61 m). Outside the residential area the land is open farmland, with relatively few trees. There is a wooded area, including a nature reserve (Fulbourn Fen) to the east in the Manor grounds. The village is set within the Cambridge Green Belt. The traditional parish boundaries follow the line of a Roman road and the Icknield Way to the southwest and southeast, Fleam Dyke – an ancient defensive earthwork – to the east, and the tributaries of Quy Water that drain to the River Cam.

Fleam Dyke bears the name of the Hundred of Cambridgeshire called Flendish that was known in the time of the Domesday Book by its Saxon name Flamingdike, pointing to the influence of Flemish immigration into the region. Flemish immigration has marked Fulbourn in various ways, with Fulbourn Windmill the most visible link to this influence. East Anglian English also shows such influence.

The parish extends some five miles (8 km) north to south and four miles (6.2 km) east to west.

== History ==
Archaeological evidence of habitation in the area has been found dating as far back as the Neolithic period, and there have been numerous finds from the Roman and Anglo-Saxon periods. The name has so far been traced back to 991 AD and is thought to derive from the Anglo-Saxon "Fugleburn" or "Fugolburna", meaning "stream frequented by waterfowl". At one time, the village had two ecclesiastical parishes with both churches in the same churchyard, separated by seven feet; All Saints, believed to be the earlier, and St. Vigor's. Some early maps depict "Fulbourn Magna" and "Fulbourn Parva" as separate villages, but a research project conducted by the Fulbourn Village History Society concluded that there was only ever one Fulbourn.

The site at Hall Orchard, a medieval moated site known as Dunmowes, survives as an earthwork and has a water-filled moat when suitable conditions exist. Excavations showed that the moated area had been occupied from at least the early 13th century until the late 17th century. The moat platform and ditch were probably constructed in the late 12th or early 13th century, with the soil and chalk dug out from the ditch being piled into the central area to create a raised platform. A large drainage ditch at the southwest corner and another at the northeast corner meet the moat ditch. These were probably inlet and outlet channels supplying the moat with continuous running water.

Some clues of the relative wealth and importance of Dunmowes Manor are available from the archaeological evidence. Decorative features associated with the building that were above and beyond practical and utilitarian purposes indicate that the owners intended to impress their neighbours and emphasise their own importance.

By the late medieval/early post-medieval period, most, if not all, of the buildings at Hall Orchard, rather than being thatched, may have been covered in relatively expensive stone roofing tiles. These were later replaced by clay peg tiles, with glazed and decorated finials and ridge tiles. Many fragments were very small, suggesting demolition of the house, with any complete tiles possibly being removed for re-use elsewhere.

=== The Five Manors of Fulbourn ===
In Norman times, Fulbourn was recognised as having five manors: Zouches Manor, Manners Manor, Colvilles Manor, Shardelowes Manor and Fulbourn Manor. Of these five, only the last remains today.

In 1496, Richard Berkeley and his wife Anne Berkeley settled a debt of 1,000 marks with property that included the manors of Fulbourn, which were then listed as Zouches, Manners, Shardelowes and Fulbourn.

=== Fulbourn Life Wall ===
A granite monument was erected in the village in October 2012, inscribed with dates and images from village life and history. The monument was created by two artists: Andrew Tanser, a master carver and sculptor, and Andrea Bassil, a well-known children's author and illustrator.

=== Historical detail ===
A section of the ancient Street way, possibly that known locally by c. 1300AD as Grauntestreet and later Grandstreet way, ran from the parish's western edge to pass the northern end of the Fleam Dyke. Few prehistoric remains have been found, except for some Bronze Age weaponry. A probable Roman settlement has left traces in inclosures and droveways visible near the western boundary. A Roman cemetery containing up to 30 skeletons was discovered to the north of the village in 1874, along with an excavation variously identified as a limekiln and a tiled grave. Another Roman limekiln was found further east in 1875 near the station, close to which a Roman pavement was discovered in around 1940.

The parish was well populated from the Middle Ages. In 1086 there were probably c. 90 peasant households and by 1279, when 56 messuages and 20 cottages were recorded, c. 275 probably resident landholders. Some 80 inhabitants paid tax in 1327 and 426 adults paid the poll tax in 1377. There were still 119 people assessed to the subsidy in 1524, and 105 households in 1563. Following subsequent growth from the 1570s, numbers may have ranged between 400 and 450 in the late 16th and early 17th centuries, increasing again from the 1620s. In the 1660s and 1670s 105 to 110 dwellings were occupied, and 107 adults were reported in 1676. There were 106 families in 1728. The population was probably again stable in the early 18th century, perhaps dropping slightly by around 1740, but began to rise from the 1750s, perhaps by a half by the 1780s. There were 166 households in the 1790s and 702 people in 1801. Until the 1840s, numbers grew by c. 150 to 200 in each decade, reaching 1,023 in 1831 and 1,452 in 1851. Pressure was reduced in the 1850s by emigration, especially to Australia. The population reached as much as 1,385 in the 1870s before again declining steadily, with a sharp fall in the 1890s when many young people left, to c. 1,200 between 1911 and 1931. Of over 180 men who fought in the First World War 37 perished. New building, which added 250 households to the village in the 1950s and 520 in the 1960s, increased its population to 1,396 by 1961, 4,139 in 1981, and 4,732, including 4,282 in private households, in 1991.

By the 18th century, dwellings in the village mostly stood toward the eastern end of c. 200 acres of surrounding crofts and closes. A main street, probably called by 1370 Church Street, linked two groups of tenements along Holm Street to the south, so named by no later than 1200 and later called Home End (Street), and along Eye Street, corrupted some time after 1400 to Hay Street, to the north-east, along whose western side crofts, some walled, abutted upon Eye field in the 1310s. In the late Middle Ages Holm and Eye streets were possibly reckoned as separate settlements, being still separately enumerated in manorial rentals c. 1435. From the main street another, the modern Cow Lane, probably called in the 13th century Fen street and in the 14th Low or Nether street, led west towards the village's main watering place, Poor's Well. Possibly in use by 1335 and certainly so named by 1437, it was designated for that purpose at inclosure. Cow Lane then joined a back lane to the south named Pierce lane by no later than 1500.

Of c. 40 houses surviving in Fulbourn in the 1980s from before 1800, mostly timber-framed, some under later brick casing, and half still thatched, most stood towards that eastern end of the village, where housing had largely been concentrated in 1800. A few others then stood along the south side of Pierce lane or at Frog End to the west. Those older houses include around ten dating from before 1600, among them some manorial farmhouses. The former Highfield Farm had a 14th-century hall with arched heads to its screen openings, and a two-bayed cross wing; it had another cross wing added after 1600. At Home End the originally 15th-century Old House had its hall reconstructed in the mid 17th century, soon after a parlour cross wing had been added, while at Ludlows, behind a Victorian front, was another early 15th-century hall with an original doorway and six-light window; its soller cross wing comprised a parlour below and two chambers above. Those houses mostly had crownpost roofs, into which red brick chimneys were inserted in the 16th century or later. At Flendyshe House, facing Ludlows where Home End widens into a small green, a rendered façade of c. 1807 covered an early 17th-century range with a rebuilt service wing to the rear. Over 20 smaller houses of two to three bays and single-storeyed cottages with dormers dated from 1700 or earlier, some from the 1660s. During the 18th century a line of eight two- or three-bayed cottages, one dated 1735, were built on small crofts south-west of the village along the south side of Broad Green, so named by no later than 1460, where dwellings had been recorded by 1506.

In the 1660s and 1670s, barely 20 of the recorded dwellings had had more than one or two hearths. About 1808 the village contained at least 78 houses, including 15 farmhouses and 42 cottages. There was rapid growth after the 1820s, the number of inhabited dwellings rising from 164 in 1831 to 270–310 between the 1840s and 1900; in the late 19th century another 15–25 were sometimes empty. Meanwhile, new farmhouses had been built on the former open fields to the south and west, including Bishop's Charity (c. 1833–5), Rectory (1827), Valley (by 1829), and New Shardelowes (1820 × 1835) Farms. In the village other farmhouses went up on the standard Cambridgeshire pattern of a symmetrical three-bayed grey brick front, sometimes with fieldstone sidewalls, besides rows of labourers' cottages off the main streets, some in brick.

By the mid-19th century there were c. 40 houses along the main street, usually still called Church Street, and its northern extension named Apthorpe Street by no later than 1506. Another 35–45 lay in a ribbon along the west side of Hay Street, where two more elaborate terraces of brick cottages were put up in 1885 and 1903. There were almost as many around Home End, with around ten by Broad Green. Another 45–50 reached along Pierce Lane to Frog End, but the parallel Cow Lane to its north was hardly built up. By 1800, a few dwellings were scattered along the roads to Teversham and Cherry Hinton. In 1910 c. 80 houses were reported and 190 cottages.

The early 20th century saw little growth, with only 340–350 dwellings being recorded in the 1920s, but around 50 had been added by 1951, mostly before 1939, including a number of council houses. The first 12 had been built in 1925, some near School Lane, and 40 more went up in 1931 and 1939 within the angle of the Cambridge and Shelford roads. By 1950 ribbon building had filled the recently empty east side of Hay Street. From the 1950s, following the arrival of mains drainage, the village was subjected to intensive development, some 280 new houses being built by 1961 and another 500 by 1981. Planning restrictions confined them within the village's previous boundary: some new building was effected by infilling along the older streets, which had c. 280 dwellings by 1980 and were almost continuously built up by 1990. Other new housing, totalling 600 dwellings by 1980, lay on c. 25 new roads, often densely packed closes, laid out within them. Private building, beginning at the east end, where c. 160 houses went up in the 1950s, spread westwards along the south side of Pierce Lane, where c. 120 were built in the early 1950s and, after a pause 1965–75, 30 more in 1977–79. Meanwhile, new council housing was concentrated on the south edge of the village, c. 50 dwellings rising in the 1950s east of the previously almost unoccupied Haggis Gap, while another 170 were put up to its west c. 1965–66. That last estate consisted of factory-built dwellings, sponsored by an enthusiastic council chairman, which were square, grey, and 'barrack-like'. By 1974 the council had also built sheltered housing for 40 old people in Home Close at Frog End; from 1981 similar wardened housing, comprising 33 bungalows, was established further south in 1983. The 1980s saw less extensive new building, although infilling with smaller groups in the remaining gaps continued, as along Cow Lane. In 1981, the 1,188 homes in the parish included 353 council houses (this number had fallen by 74 by 1991) and 709 owner-occupied ones, with 126 being privately rented. Of c. 450 dwellings added in the 1980s, almost all were privately owned.

Fulbourn at one time had as many as 10 or 11 public houses, one for every 120 inhabitants at the time. These included:

- The Plough and Crown, renamed, from 1776, The Six Bells (extant)
- The Harrow Inn, closed 1911
- The Coach and Horses, closed 1902
- The Railway Tavern
- The Royal Oak
- The Loyal Townley
- The Ancient Shepherds (1880s to 1920)
- The Rising Sun, closed 1956
- The Crown and Thistle closed in 1990s

== Community ==
The village had numerous alewives by the late 14th century, sometimes presented for not putting up their 'alethorp' and for late-night opening. Three public houses were recorded from c. 1770: the Plough and Crown, renamed from 1776 the Six Bells, occupies a four-bayed timber-framed house of 16th-century origin with a jettied first floor rising over a coach entrance, later blocked. The adjoining Coach and Horses, first kept by the squire's coachman, and the Harrow, in a 17th-century house, which closed respectively in 1902 and 1911, stood nearby along the main street. After inclosure the White Hart, occupying a new grey brick house, was opened at Home End. In the early 19th century they were taken over, following bankruptcies, by Cambridge breweries. Several others were opened from the 1830s, nine in all by 1858, some in new built premises, including one near the station from 1859, when there were four public and six beer houses. Their clubrooms accommodated friendly societies such as a Lodge of Oddfellows set up in 1846, called the 'Loyal Townley' after the squire, and from the 1880s to the 1920s a branch of the Ancient Shepherds. There were 10–11 licensed premises, one for every 120 inhabitants, c. 1910, and still eight in 1937, but their numbers were gradually reduced. One of the last remaining pubs closed in 1990–91, leaving just the Baker's Arms (now the 'Hat and Rabbit') on the corner of Teversham road, the Six Bells (remodelled after fire damage its thatched roof in 1963 and again in 1985) and the White Hart.

By the mid-18th century, Fulbourn's village feast was held on three days after the first Sunday after Trinity. Described in 1881 as a 'noisy ... annual nuisance', it was formally reduced to two days in 1883. Despite objections to its obstructing the streets and to the gypsy showmen's insanitary habits, it remained well attended into the mid-1910s. Held from 1920 after midsummer behind the Six Bells, it survived until 1936. It was supplemented by an annual flower and fruit show held from 1880 in the squire's grounds by the village's Horticultural Society. That also lapsed in 1937 for lack of organisers, but was revived in conjunction with Teversham from 1956. Other fêtes included the regular celebration of Empire Day by the schoolchildren between 1907 and c. 1940, and others sponsored by the village Labour party from the 1920s.

From the 19th century, the village was well supplied with institutions providing social activities, and venues for them. A cricket club, active from the 1820s to the 1860s, was reorganised in 1880. There was also a football club from c. 1900, and intermittently from c. 1920 one for tennis. The parish council, after hiring a recreation ground from the rector from 1897 to 1908, accepted in 1921 a larger one from the Townleys, south-east of the village; this was subsequently purchased in 1966 and the original pavilion replaced the following year. A Conservative Club started in 1885 to attract the newly enfranchised labourers, which soon claimed 100 members, was active into the 20th century. For a Working Men's Institute formed in 1873 a reading room was erected on School Lane in 1878. It still had 200 members in 1927, but, though reopened after 1945, declined in the 1950s through competition from ex-servicemen's clubs, among them a British Legion branch started in 1920 which had 300 members in 1981. The Institute was closed c. 1958 and its building sold in 1972. A Women's Institute was started in 1921. The National schoolroom was used as an 'Assembly Room' for entertainments from the 1880s until the squire, C. F. Townley, who liked amateur dramatics, built a well-equipped village hall in 1925. Seating 300, and with a stage, the hall was given to the parish by his son in Townley's memory in 1931. It was still in regular use today.

Fulbourn had a resident physician from the 1850s; one, F. L. Nicholls, who served c. 1888–1938, was a promoter of many local activities. In c. 1957, the surgery was located at the end of Apthorpe Street opposite the present rectory. The district council provided a health centre at Haggis Gap from c. 1973. Epidemics of typhoid in 1886 and 1887 had been ascribed to poor drainage and infected water from wells. In 1885 the Cambridge Waterworks Co. nevertheless chose an area just west of the Poor's Well as the site for a pumping station to supply Cambridge, which was opened in 1891. The village had since 1887 received piped water through standpipes, which partly made up for the gradual drying up of its own wells and the draining of the Poor's Well itself. To avoid the villagers' sewage contaminating the pumped water, a new pumping station was built from 1912 to the east by the Fleam Dyke. In operation from 1921, it supplied in 1954 two-thirds of the county's water. The older station, regularly operated again thenceforth, was finally closed by 1989 when the site was sold for development; its listed grey brick main building was shortly converted for housing. The Fleam Dyke station was then still in use; its steam machinery had been partly preserved as museum pieces when it was electrified and its tall chimney demolished c. 1976.

== Population ==
Most of the population live within a square half-mile in the main village. The main settlement around the parish church of St Vigor has extended in post-war years west towards Cambridge and north in a narrow ribbon of development towards the former station on the Ipswich to Ely Line (Cambridge branch). There has been substantial housing estate development, both local authority and private, particularly southwest and south of the centre. The civil parish contains additional housing located on the edge of Cherry Hinton, which itself falls within the Cambridge City boundary.

The population of the parish in the 2011 census was 4,673, compared with 4,704 in 2001. This has grown from a base of 1,440 in 1951 to 2,060 in 1961, 4,220 in 1971 and 1998 at 5,100. The 1979 boundary changes moved some (then) un-built-on land from Fulbourn and some partly developed land from Teversham both into the ecclesiastical parish of Cherry Hinton, as it was considered the people living there would look towards the churches in those parishes. Most of the subsequent growth in the administrative parish of Fulbourn has been in this area, which is not part of the ecclesiastical parish. In 1998 the population of the civil parish was made up of 1,000 people under 16, 3,100 aged 16–59, and 1,000 over 60. The economically active population was estimated at 2,600.

== Street names ==
=== Haggis Gap ===
The name of this street is a source of much local humour. According to Stephen Macaulay, Senior Project Officer, Archaeological Field Unit at Cambridgeshire County Council, "It was a small trackway and there was a gap in the field boundary (hedge) through which the local owners, surname Haggis, could access their land, hence the name".

=== Dunmowe Way ===
This street is a reference to Dunmowes Manor, one of the five historic manors of the village.

== Local government ==
Fulbourn falls within the jurisdiction of Cambridgeshire County Council and South Cambridgeshire District Council plus Fulbourn Parish Council

== Employment and commerce ==
Since World War II most residents in employment have worked outside the village, in Cambridge or elsewhere. Many find work at the nearby Addenbrookes Hospital. Within the village itself there is employment in small industrial areas close to the former railway station and elsewhere to the north of the village. There are also professional offices in the former rectory and pumping station and a developing business park in redundant hospital buildings and in new buildings close by. Others are employed in service industries such as retail, and in education. Agriculture, though still important in terms of land use, only employs a small number of people.

The village's business park is joined by the Capital Park on the site of the old hospital, which has many tens of thousands of square feet of office space. These parks enhance the area's business environment beyond what was started by the creation of the Science parks which date from the 1980s and 1990s.

Fulbourn has been home to Prior Scientific, a manufacturer of optical microscopes, since 1988.

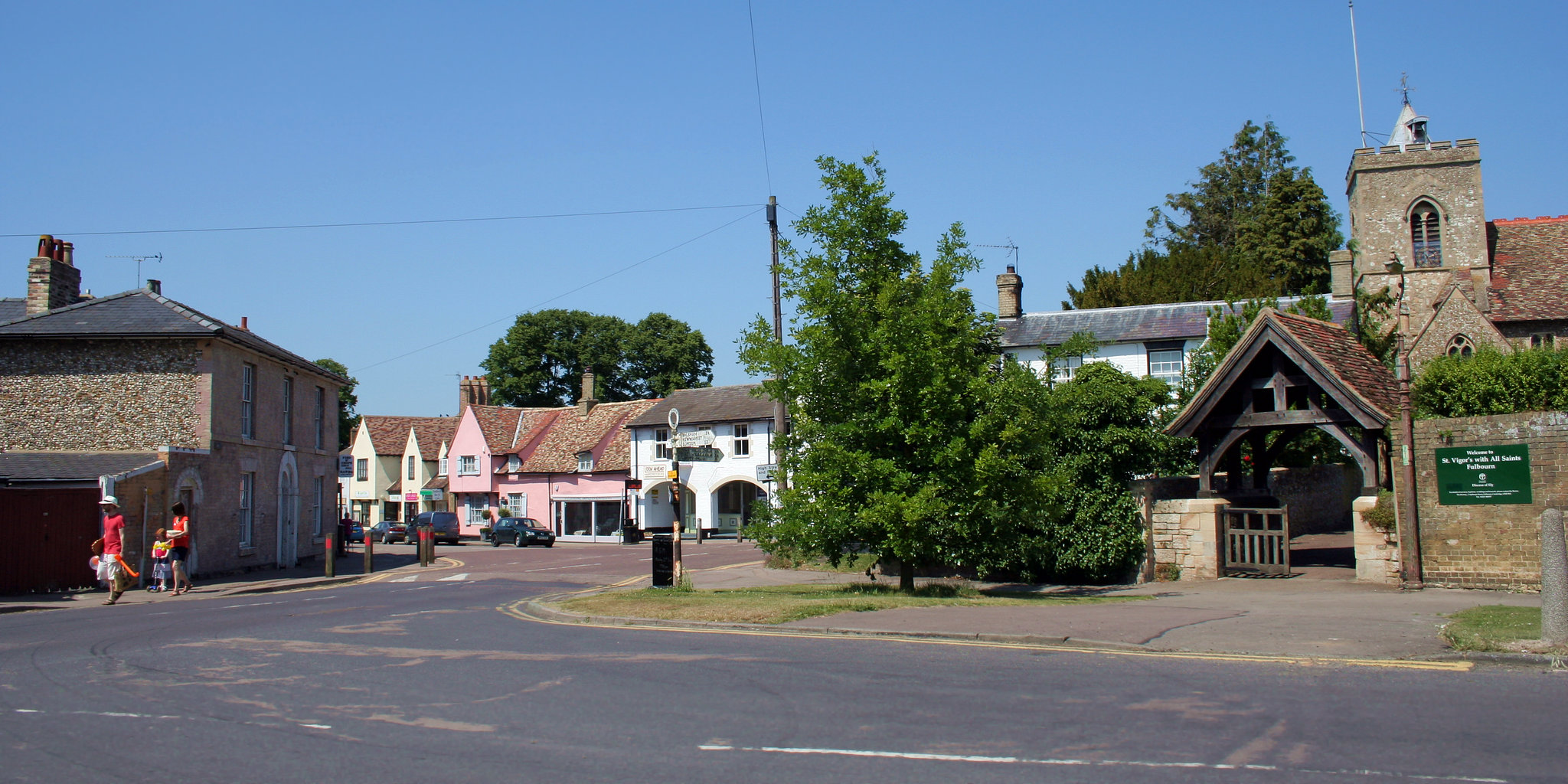
Fulbourn High Street and church of St Vigor and All Saints in July 2013

== Healthcare ==
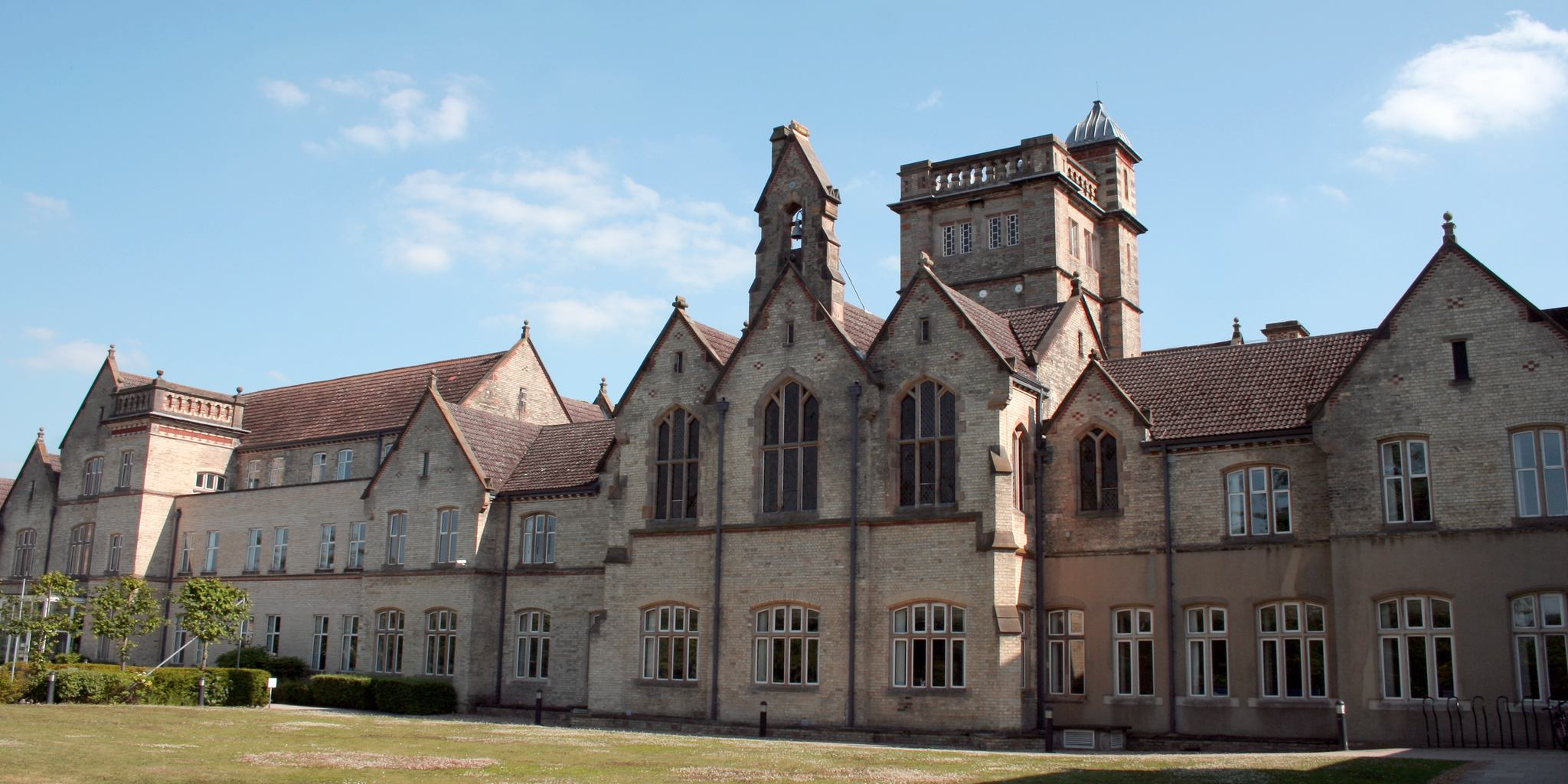
Victoria House at the Capital Park, housing the Faculty of Health and Social Care of Anglia Ruskin University in July 2013

Fulbourn Hospital was built as an asylum in the mid-19th century between the village and Cherry Hinton. Until recently the main Victorian building was used as a psychiatric hospital, while the 1960s Kent House to the west was built for acute mental health patients and the Ida Darwin Hospital to the east was developed for the mentally handicapped. The main buildings have now been transformed into a Business Park although some acute facilities remain. From 540 patients at the hospitals in 1981 the number has been considerably reduced, with many ex-patients being moved into the community. The former East of England Strategic Health Authority's offices (NHS East of England) were on the Business Park, as are that of Health Data Insight.

For everyday healthcare there is a health centre in the village with a single practice, though this is based at premises on the edge of Cambridge; there is also a chiropodist in the village.

== Sport and recreation ==
The village has a well-appointed recreation ground. Adjacent to this is the Townley Memorial village hall, which includes meeting rooms and a small indoor sports hall, and provides a venue for sports and social clubs.

There are a community centre and a village hall on separate sites, the hall being adjacent to the extensive recreation ground. The village also has a retirement home, Home Close: the Rector currently sits on the Residents' Committee, visits the home regularly and conducts services there.

Fulbourn has two Non-League football clubs: Fulbourn Institute F.C. who play at the Recreation Ground, and Fulbourn Sports, who play at Capital Park, Cambridge Road. There are also two colts clubs, Fulbourn Institute and Fulbourn Falcons.

There is a thriving amateur dramatics society in the village, St John's Players. The Players celebrated their 70th anniversary in 2017, and perform three plays a year, in February, May and October to coincide with half-term weeks. They also put on occasional one-off performances during the year, such as their Christmas panto. Performances and rehearsals are staged in the Townley Memorial Hall.

== Education ==
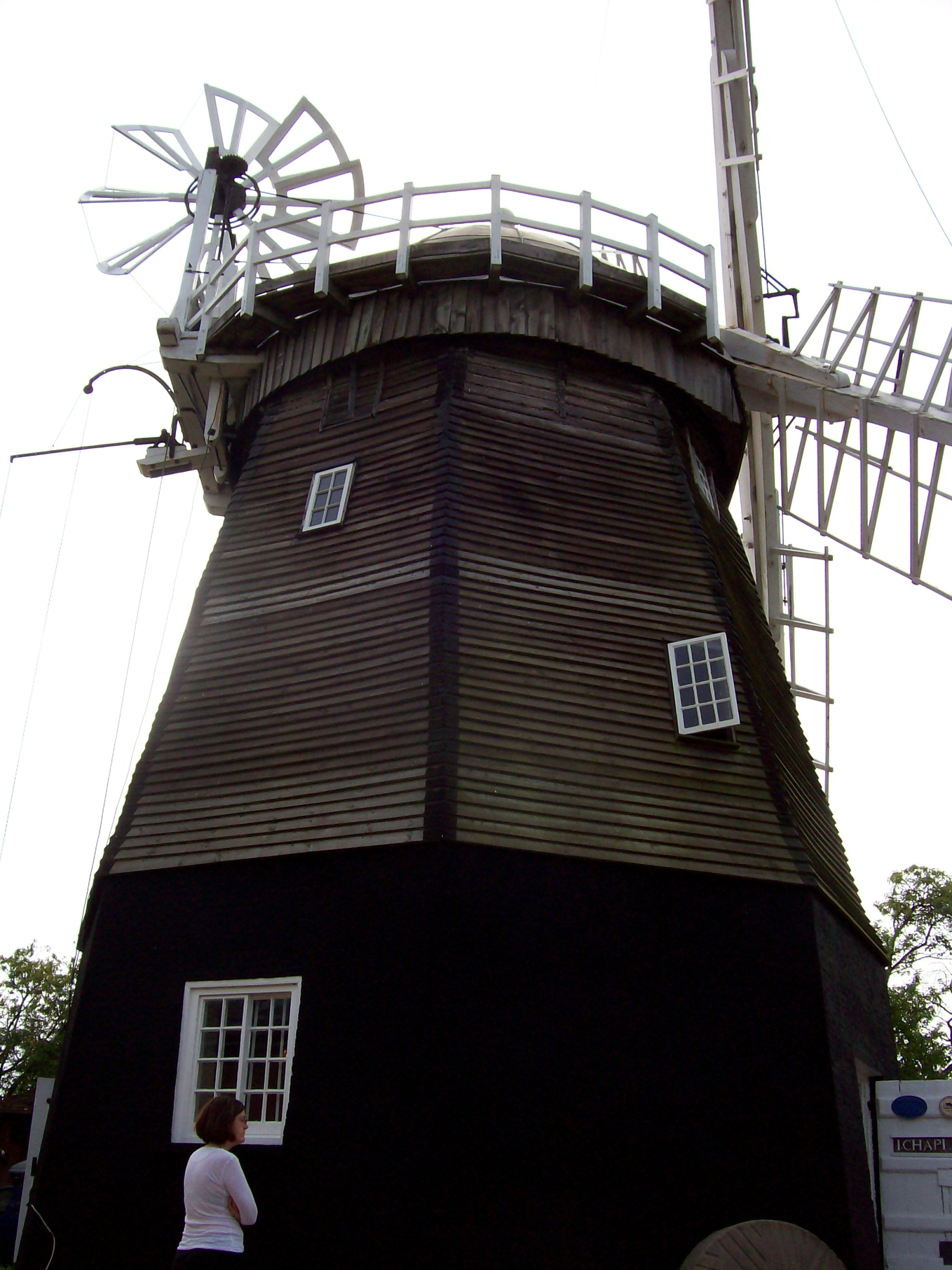
Fulbourn windmill

There are three schools in Fulbourn. Fulbourn Primary School, close to the village centre, is a state primary school that has about 270 pupils. Landmark International School and Cambridge Steiner Waldorf School are private institutions. For secondary education the village is in the catchment area of Village College in Bottisham 5 miles (8 km) to the north.

Pre-school education is provided at Fulbourn Pre-school (co-located with the Primary School), Cambridge Steiner Waldorf School, and Domino Nursery School (in the United Reformed Church hall).

Anglia Ruskin University has a campus situated within the Capital Park, which includes clinical skill facilities, a library, a computer room, a student common room and a canteen.

Fulbourn library is a volunteer-run facility supported by Cambridgeshire County Council Library Service and was re-opened by volunteers in November 2003, having been closed by the County Council the previous month. It moved from the Old School to its current location in the new development, The Swifts, in 2009.

== Future developments ==
Proposals for significant additional housing to the north of the village after 2016 included in the current Structure Plan review have been vigorously fought by the Parish and District Councils. The panel that conducted an examination into the review has recommended that these proposals be dropped. It is expected, however, that whatever the outcome, some additional housing will be built within or on the edge of the village in the next ten years or so. Apart from the village's business park, there are no current proposals for major additional employment opportunities in Fulbourn.

== Arts and artists ==
Fulbourn is home to several artists: painters, sculptors, jewellers, potters, textile artists participate in Open Studios in July.

Alice Goodman, the Anglican Rector of Fulbourn, is a published poet, and was the librettist of the operas Nixon in China and The Death of Klinghoffer.

== Transport ==
=== Roads ===
By the late 13th century Fulbourn was linked to the Icknield Way by fieldways leading south-east, including Weston, Balsham, and (Old) Wood ways, while Mill Way and Granditch Way, continued respectively by Limekiln Way and Hintonwal Way (also Hintonwald Way), led west towards Cherry Hinton and Cambridge. At the time of inclosure, those running south-east were mostly stopped up and replaced by a single straight road, while the western ones had their courses straightened.

=== Railway ===
Under the Newmarket and Chesterford Railway Act 1846 (9 & 10 Vict. c. clxxii), the Newmarket Railway Company built a section of its line from Great Chesterford to Newmarket across the south-east of the parish. The line opened in 1848 but closed in 1851 and was formally abandoned in 1858, after the company completed the direct line from Cambridge which crosses Fulbourn north of the village to join the earlier line at Six Mile Bottom.

A station was erected on the Balsham Road, but the building was demolished after 1930; various cuttings and a bridge were still visible in the 1980s. A new station for Fulbourn was opened by 1852 on Hay Street, renamed Station Road in the 20th century. That station was closed in 1967 and its buildings demolished after 1973, although the line remains open today.

The village grew rapidly after the Second World War until the station was closed as a result of the Beeching Report. The station platform is still in place, albeit decayed, and a local campaign to reopen the station started in 2015. An experimental social media campaign to support the reopening was picked up by the local press.

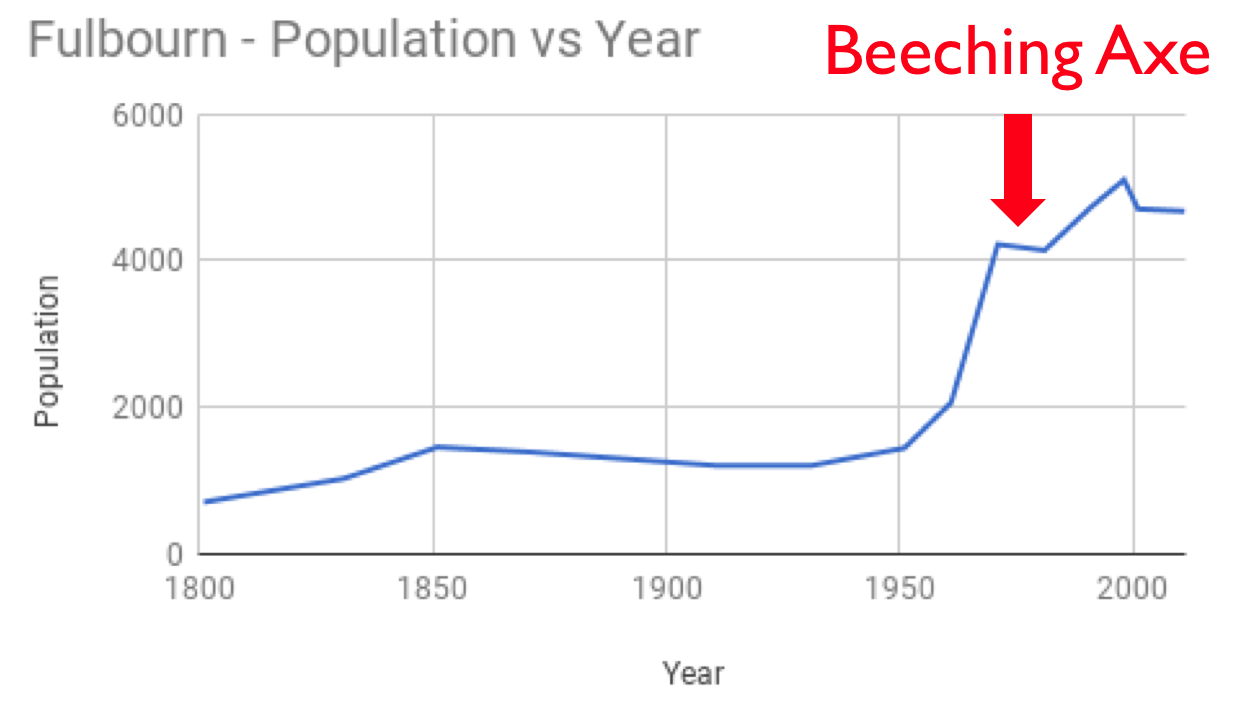
The Beeching Axe halted growth in the village

== Notable figures ==
- Alan la Zouche (1205–1270), Earl of Brittany – builder of Zouches Manor.
- Stephen de Fulbourn – Archbishop of Tuam and Justiciar of Ireland (died 3 July 1288)
- Walter de Fulburn, brother of Stephen– statesman, bishop and Lord Chancellor in medieval Ireland (died 1307)
- Andrew Newport (Warden of the Mint) – courtier, alderman of London, High Sheriff of Cambridgeshire and Warden of the Mint in the reign of Richard II (died before 1408)
- William Fulbourn – English politician (died c.1441)
- Thomas Townley (cricketer) – soldier, jockey and cricketer (30 April 1825 – 9 April 1895). Born at Fulbourn Manor and rode in the 1860 Grand National.
- C. V. Durell – schoolmaster, mathematician and textbook author (6 June 1882, Fulbourn – 10 December 1968 South Africa)
- Andrew Percy Bennett – British diplomat (30 July 1866 – 3 November 1943)
- Max Townley – land agent, agriculturist and politician (22 June 1864 – 12 December 1942)
- Seiriol Evans – Anglican dean and author (22 November 1894 – 29 June 1984)
- Russell Claydon – professional golfer
- Dudley Williams (biochemist) – University of Cambridge Professor of Biological Chemistry (25 May 1937 – 3 November 2010)
- Herb Elliott - Australian middle distance runner and 1,500-metre World and Olympic record holder and gold medalist (mid 1950s)

== See also ==
- List of places in Cambridgeshire
