= William Fulbourn =

English politician

William Fulbourn (died c. 1441), of Fulbourn St. Vigors, Cambridgeshire, was an English politician.

== Family ==
Fulbourn may have been the illegitimate son of William Fulbourn and Alice Whiting of Fulbourn. William married before 1396.

== Career ==
He was a member (MP) of the parliament of England for Cambridgeshire in December 1421.
