= National Information Governance Board for Health and Social Care =

The National Information Governance Board for Health and Social Care (NIGB) advised the United Kingdom government on information governance between 2008 and 2013.

== History ==
The board was established under section 157 of the Health and Social Care Act 2008, with effect from October 2008, with a range of advisory functions relating to information governance. From January 2009, the NIGB also gained functions under section 251 of the NHS Act 2006 which had previously been held by the Patient Information Advisory Group (PIAG) until its abolition. These functions were to advise the Secretary of State for Health on the use of powers to set aside the common law duty of confidentiality in England, where identifiable patient information is needed and where consent is not practicable.

From 1 April 2013, the NIGB's functions for monitoring and improving information governance practice transferred to the Care Quality Commission, which established a National Information Governance Committee to oversee this work. Functions relating to section 251 of the NHS Act 2006 (access to people's personal and confidential information for research purposes) were transferred to the Health Research Authority's Confidentiality Advisory Group.

== Terms of reference ==
The key functions of the NIGB (excerpted from the legislation) were:

1. to monitor the practice followed by relevant bodies in relation to the processing of relevant information;
2. to keep the Secretary of State for Health, and such bodies as the Secretary of State for Health may designate by direction, informed about the practice being followed by relevant bodies in relation to the processing of relevant information;
3. to publish guidance on the practice to be followed in relation to the processing of relevant information;
4. to advise the Secretary of State for Health on particular matters relating to the processing of relevant information by any person; and
5. to advise persons who process relevant information on such matters relating to the processing of relevant information by them as the Secretary of State for Health may from time to time designate by direction.

The definition of “relevant information” in the legislation covers patient information, any other information obtained or generated in the course of the provision of the health service, and any information obtained or generated in the course of the exercise by a local social services authority in England of its adult social services functions.

== Ethics and Confidentiality Committee ==
Some areas of NIGB functions (d) and (e) above had been delegated to the NIGB's Ethics and Confidentiality Committee (ECC). These functions primarily related to applications to use identifiable patient information without consent, in specific circumstances within the bounds of section 251 of the NHS Act 2006. These applications, which had been considered by PIAG before the NIGB, passed on to the Health Research Authority's Confidentiality Advisory Group (CAG) on 1 April 2013.

== Care Record Development Board ==
The NIGB had also replaced the Care Record Development Board (CRDB), which had closed in September 2007. The NIGB had subsequently maintained the NHS Care Record Guarantee which was originally developed by the CRDB and developed a companion Social Care Record Guarantee.

== Members ==
The NIGB had consisted of a Chair, a number of Public Members appointed by the NHS Appointments Commission, and a number of Representative Members appointed by the Secretary of State for Health from a range of stakeholder organisations. Representatives of several other stakeholder organisations had served as Corresponding Advisers to the NIGB but had not typically attended meetings. Regular observers at meetings had included representatives from the Information Commissioner's Office and the devolved UK administrations.

The ECC had consisted of a Chair and a number of Members, all of whom had been appointed by the NIGB with advice from an NHS Appointments Commission approved independent assessor. The ECC Chair and two ECC Members had also been NIGB Members.

Between 1 June 2011 and 31 March 2013 Dame Fiona Caldicott was Chair of the NIGB, succeeding Harry Cayton who had chaired the NIGB since its inception.

== Geography ==
Members of the NIGB and ECC were widely distributed nationally but had attended meetings at the NIGB office. Since September 2011, this had been based at Skipton House, London SE1. The NIGB's staff team had been predominantly based at this office.

== Abolition ==
As a result of the Health and Social Care Act 2012 the NIGB was abolished with effect from 1 April 2013. The functions delegated to the ECC with respect to research transferred to the Health Research Authority. The NHS Commissioning Board, later known as NHS England, is now responsible for providing advice and guidance to NHS bodies. Other functions were transferred to the National Information Governance Committee hosted by the Care Quality Commission.
