= 1860 Grand National =

English steeplechase horse race

- Grand National
- Location: Aintree
- Date: 7 March 1860
- Winning horse: (Ireland) Anatis
- Starting price: 7/2 Fav
- Jockey: Mr Tommy Pickernell
- Trainer: H. E. May
- Owner: Christopher Capel
- Conditions: Good

The 1860 Grand National was the 22nd renewal of the Grand National horse race that took place at Aintree near Liverpool, England, on 7 March 1860.

== The Course ==
The course was unchanged from the previous year. First circuit: Starting from the field used every year since 1851, Fence 1 {15} Bank, Fence 2 {16} Hedge and ditch, Fence 3 {17} Post and Rails, Fence 4 {18} Rails and ditch, Fence 5 {19} Becher's Brook, Fence 6 {20} Rails and a ditch, Fence 7 {21} Post and rails Fence 8 {22} Canal side turn bank, Fence 9 {23} Valentine's Brook, Fence 10 {24} Ditch and quickset, Fence 11 {25} Post and rails, Fence 12 {26} Stump hedge and ditch.

The runners then turned at the first opportunity on re-entering the racecourse and made towards the fences in front of the stands. Fence 13 Thorn topped hurdles, Fence 14 Made brook 15' wide.

Second circuit: The runners then turned away from the Grandstands again and crossed Proceed's lane, following the same circuit until reaching the racecourse again. This time the runners continued to the wider extreme of the course before turning to run up the straight in front of the stands where Fence 27 the Distance hurdles had to be jumped.

The runners then bypassed the Gorsed Hurdle and Made brook inside before reaching the winning post in front of the Main Stand.

== Build up and leading contenders ==
Twenty five horses appeared on the race card but only nineteen lined up with six non runners, including the heavily backed Jealousy, which caused much anger among many of the crowd.

Anatis had been the favourite for weeks before the race. Since finishing fifth last year, the horse had run seven times, winning at Shrewsbury, Abergavenny and the Grand Annual at Worcester. Tommy Pickernell, an amateur who rode under a pseudonym, Mr Thomas retained the last year. Described as a powerful tearing mare who was trained specifically for the National, The public had huge faith in the mare on that basis.

Tease had already been sent of as a Grand National favourite two years earlier under the name Little Tom but with Ben Land Junior in the saddle, had fallen twice. Now renamed, he was again a hugely popular choice with the public. George Ede, another amateur who rode under a pseudonym, Mr Edwards was booked to ride but when the horse trod on his own bandages, revealing suspiciously fragile legs and also throwing Ede, who was too shaken to ride in the race. Walter White, whose own mount had already been withdrawn, was quickly booked to ride. By then many in the crowd had seen enough for his price to drift out from 5/1 to 7/1 at the off.

Xanthus had been going well when coming to grief in the previous years race, having finished third the year before, both with Gus Balchin in the saddle, who took the ride for a third time. His previous experience stood him in good stead and he galloped in great style in the preliminaries, being sent off at 10/1.

Maria Agnes was a picture of perfection in the paddock and with George Stevens in the saddle was a naturally popular choice at 10/1

Linkboy was another that looked particularly good in the paddock and in the canters with Willy Bevill taking his second ride in the race at 12/1.

== The race ==
The runners were sent away to a good first time start, taking the first fence in a cluster before Congreve and Miss Harkaway both refused the second fence.

Xanthus white jacket and blue garters was showing in front by the third fence before Goldsmith rushed to the front at the fourth, setting a harsh pace by Becher's Brook with The Curate, Xanthus and Telegram all well up with Kilcock, Maria Agnes and Brunette heading the remainder with last placed Sir Robert less than a dozen lengths behind the leader.

The Curate took a heavy fall at the post and rails beyond Becher's, with, several of those behind him having to take avoiding action. Goldsmith unshipped Land when swerving and Clay's battles to stay on board Shylock cost him a good sixty yards, while Captain Townley lost both irons on The Huntsman.

Xanthus now led going to the Canal Turn where Pickernell used expert skill to steer Anatis across the corner of the turn, gaining many lengths in the process. The field became stretched going down the Canal side with Telegram and Huntsman well up with Tease in mid division.

Balchin now kicked Xanthus into a commanding lead coming back onto the racecourse for the first time before easing the pace going towards the thorn topped hurdles at the distance chair and the artificial brook in front of the stands. Telegram and Anatis were next, three lengths clear of Huntsman, Redwing, Brunette, Sepoy, Bridegroom, Linkboy, Tease and Maria Agnes with a gap back the remounted Goldsmith with Shylock and Horniblow tailed off. Sir Robert had been in the rear from an early stage and was pulled up here while Kilcock swerved away, jumping the rail into the finishing straight.

Maria Agnes took the turn out onto the second circuit better than the rest of the field, making up a lot of ground on the leader. At second Becher's Xanthus still led from Anatis, Telegram, The Huntsman, followed by Maria Agnes, Linkboy, Sepoy, Brunette, Bridegroom and Horniblow with Redwing, Tease, Shylock and Goldsmith at the tail.

With his earlier fall having effectively ended his chance, Land pulled up Goldsmith while the suspicions over Tease's legs were proved correct, Walter White having to dismount and lead the horse in. Telegram took a heavy fall at the next while Shylock, Sepoy and Horniblow were tailed off by the Canal turn.

Going to the turn, Tommy Pickernell on Anatis was a length down on Gus Balchin on Xanthus but while the latter jumped straight and on the right of the fence, the former repeated his action of the first circuit and cut the corner tight, coming away two lengths in front while The Huntsman took it third and clear of Maria Agnes, Linkboy Bridegroom and Brunette.

The race lay between the leading trio down the canal side before Xanthus began to weaken to leave only The Huntsman to challenge Anatis going to the final flight of hurdles. Both horses struck the obstacle, knocking the hurdles away but without either being knocked from their stride as their two amateur riders, Pickernell and Townley began to fight out the finish.

Townley, an MCC Cricketer and Crimea veteran was the one working the harder, Pickernell able to keep his mount going longer before reaching for his whip in the closing strides to claim a half length victory on the mare. Xanthus was six lengths back in third, repeating his performance of two years previously, with the strong finishing Redwing another six lengths back in fourth with Linkboy cantering in another twenty lengths back in fifth. Bridegroom and Brunette were next, both passing Maria Agnes in the closing stages. The Curate confused many by coming in along with the eighth placed mare but was merely trotting in after departing the contest on the first circuit. A long time after Horniblow, Shylock and Goldsmith walked in having all pulled up.

== Finishing Order ==
Position	Name	Jockey	Handicap (st-lb)	SP	Distance	Colours
Winner	Anatis	Tommy Pickernell {Rode under the name Mr Thomas}	9-8	7-2 Fav	9 Minutes, 53 seconds	Purple, orange sleeves, black cap
Seconds	The Huntsman	Captain Thomas Townley	11-8	33-1	Half a length	Blue, red sleeves and cap
03	Xanthus	Gus Balchin	10-0	10-1	6 Lengths	White, blue garters, red cap
Fourth	Redwing	Rourke	10-8	40-1	6 Lengths	Purple, white sleeves, black cap
Fifth	Linkboy	Willy Bevill	8-12	12-1	20 Lengths	Blue, white piping, black cap
Sixth	Bridegroom	Rev Edward Tyrrwhitt-Drake {Rode as Mr Ekard}	10-6	40-1		Brown, white spots and cap
Seventh	Brunette	Joe Kendall	12-0	100-6		Green, black cap
Eighth	Maria Agnes	George Stevens	9-8	10-1		Blue, red cap
Fence 22 {Canal Turn}	Horniblow	E. Enoch	10-10	40-1	Tailed off, walked in	Pink, black cap
Fence 22 {Canal Turn}	Sepoy	Chris Green	9-0	40-1	Tailed off, Pulled up after	
Fence 20 {Rails and Ditch}	Telegram	George Palmer	9-9	100-7	Fell	Buff, red cap
Fence 19 Becher's Brook	Tease {Formerly Little Tom}	Walter White	10-2	7-1	Pulled up {Lame}	
Fence 13 {Thorn Hurdles}	Sir Robert	Charles Boyce	10-2	33-1	Tailed off, Pulled Up	Purple, buff sleeves, black cap
Fence 13 {Thorn Hurdles}	Kilcock	Dan Meaney	10-0	40-1	Ran out	Purple, white sleeves, black cap
Fence 7 {Post and Rails}	Goldsmith	Ben Land	10-10	100-6	Unseated rider, remounted, tailed off and pulled up 2nd Bechers, walked in	Blue, red sleeves and cap
Fence 6 {Rails and Ditch}	The Curate {Formerly Flatcatcher}	George Eatwell	9-4	40-1	Fell	Red, white cap
Fence 6 {Rails and Ditch}	Shylock	Clay	9-2	25-1	Hampered, tailed off, pulled up after 2nd Canal turn, walked in	
Fence 2 {Hedge and Ditch}	Congreve	W Gammage	9-0	40-1	Refused	
Fence 2 {Hedge and Ditch}	Miss Harkaway	Lotan	9-8	40-1	Refused	Black, red cap

== Captain Townley's bribe ==
In some race histories published in the 20th Century, a story is told of Captain Townley, having realised he isn't going to win, issuing bribes to Tommy Pickernell, which grow larger as the post gets closer. However, this story doesn't sit with the contemporary reports, which had Townley giving his all from the final hurdle and being almost alongside Anatis until the final strides. The story doesn't appear in any press articles and is not recorded as having been recalled in anecdote by either Pickernell nor Townley. There also appears to be no reliable source cited when the story is alleged in any publication.

The only major first hand anecdote of the race comes from Willy Bevill, who rode Linkboy to finish fifth, and would often tell that he felt sure The Huntsman and Townley would have won, had he not lost both irons at Bechers. In his lifetime, Townley was aware of Bevill's anecdote, which it's said greatly pleased him. Upon his death in 1895 no obituary mentions any story of the bribe, all merely recalling that he narrowly failed to win the race, having lost both irons, making it likely the tale is a tall story that has appeared in a publication, being repeated by later publications without citation. The story is also almost identical to that recalled in the 1850 race where another Captain, D'Arcy is alleged to have offered bribes to the winner. As in 1860, the story appears to have no reliable source.
