= Thomas Townley (cricketer) =

English cricketer, soldier, and jockey

Personal information
- Full name: Thomas Manners Townley
- Born: 30 April 1825; Fulbourn, Cambridgeshire, England
- Died: 9 April 1895 (aged 69); Marylebone, London, England
- Batting: Unknown
- Bowling: Unknown

Domestic team information
- Years: Team
- 1847–1848: Marylebone Cricket Club
- 1847–1848: Cambridge University

Career statistics
Competition	First-class
Matches	10
Runs scored	96
Batting average	5.33
100s/50s	–/–
Top score	22
Balls bowled	?
Wickets	0
Bowling average	–
5 wickets in innings	–
10 wickets in match	–
Best bowling	–
Catches/stumpings	2/–
- Source: Cricinfo, 26 January 2023

Thomas Manners Townley (30 April 1825 – 9 April 1895) was an English soldier, an amateur jockey, and a cricketer who played first-class cricket in 10 matches for Cambridge University, the Marylebone Cricket Club (MCC) and other amateur sides in 1847 and 1848. He was born at Fulbourn, Cambridgeshire and died at Marylebone, London.

Townley was educated at Eton College and at Trinity College, Cambridge. He played cricket at Eton and appeared as a lower-order batsman and bowler in the Eton v Harrow cricket match in the three seasons from 1841 to 1843. It is not known whether he batted right- or left-handed, nor what style of bowling he adopted. His cricket career at Cambridge was not impressive: he again batted mainly in the lower order, and though bowling figures for most matches of his era are incomplete, there is no record that he took any wickets in games that were later deemed to be first-class. Despite this lack of achievement, he won a Blue in both 1847 and 1848 by appearing in the University Match against Oxford University. In addition to playing for the university side, he also appeared in games for MCC against the university in both 1847 and 1848, and also for the Gentlemen of England team and for a "Cambridge Townsmen" side which was a fleeting variant on the Cambridge Town Club.

The directory of Cambridge University alumni has no record that Townley graduated from the university; it notes that in 1849, a year after his final first-class cricket appearance, he was a cornet in the 10th Hussars. By 1857, he was promoted to captain and had seen service in the Crimean War; he bought himself out of the army in 1859. He was prominent in steeplechase racing as an amateur jockey, and finished second in the 1860 Grand National on The Huntsman, which went on to win the race in 1862 with a different rider.
