= Catherine Hughes (diplomat) =

British civil servant, diplomat, and academic administrator

Principal of Somerville College, Oxford
- In office 1989–1996
- Preceded by: Daphne Park
- Succeeded by: Fiona Caldicott

Personal details
- Born: Catherine Eva Pestell; 24 September 1933 County Durham, England
- Died: 10 December 2014 (aged 81)
- Spouse: Trevor Hughes (m. 1991–2014)
- Education: Leeds Girls' High School
- Alma mater: University of Oxford

Catherine Eva Hughes CMG (née Pestell; 24 September 1933 – 10 December 2014) was a British diplomat and academic administrator. She was Principal of Somerville College, Oxford, from 1989 to 1996.

== Early life and education ==
Hughes was born on 24 September 1933 in County Durham, England, to Edmund Pestell and his wife Isabelle Pestell (née Sangster). Having won a scholarship, she was educated at Leeds Girls' High School, a selective private school in Leeds. She then studied history at St Hilda's College, Oxford, and graduated with a Bachelor of Arts (BA) degree.

== Diplomatic career ==
Two of her history tutors recognised her academic excellence, encouraged her to apply for St Hilda's, Oxford, a women-only college, in 1952. She passed the civil service with flying colours, and was asked to enter the diplomatic corps. The Foreign Office mandarins were entirely male during her first posting in London. Hughes was sent to The Hague. From there she spent three and a half years in Bangkok, as Second Secretary, during decolonisation and a rising tide of communism in south-east Asia. After another stint in London, this time for five years, she was made First Secretary for the prestigious Organisation for Economic Co-operation and Development (OECD) in Paris.

She was asked in 1975 to take the tough role of negotiator in East Berlin missions in a divided city during the Cold War détente, having as a visiting fellow to St Anthony's already established an international reputation. Colleagues apparently recalled her good sense of humour, as absurdist. In an existential world of hardship and political paranoia she remained "cantankerous". During the 1980s she had a three-year posting to Bonn (West Germany) speaking several foreign languages. Recalled to London, she served as assistant undersecretary of state at the Foreign Office for two years.

== Oxford University ==
Having graduated with a first class degree in history from Oxford, Hughes returned on being elected as a visiting fellow of St Anthony's. She was appointed as principal of Somerville College in 1989, at the height of Thatcherism. Next to Somerville was Green College, a new foundation. In 1991, she married the acting Warden of Green College, Dr Trevor Hughes. The fellows of Somerville, who included the Prime Minister, were strongly opposed to any dilution of the last bastion of femininity at the most ancient university in the British Isles. Hughes believed her management style was more primus inter pares than the Cabinet's. Men were finally admitted to Somerville in 1994 and Hughes retired two years later.

== Later life and death ==
On retirement with her husband, Hughes remained in close contact with Oxford. She was a member of St Frideswide's Book Club, named after the Oxford martyr. Suffering from cancer, she still travelled, enjoying cruises. In 2014 she established the Rhabanus Maurus Travel Grant.

Hughes died on 10 December 2014.

Dr Alice Prochaska, who was then Somerville College Principal, and one of her successors, paid a tribute

This is a very sad time for the whole College. Catherine Hughes was an insightful, effective and much respected Principal. She was kind and considerate to all her colleagues, and much concerned with the intellectual development and well-being of the students. She and her husband, Trevor Hughes's wonderfully generosity to Somerville on behalf of students and Fellows has made a significant difference. At this time, we remember above all a much-loved and very distinguished Principal, who held Somerville close to her heart.

Academic offices
Preceded by Daphne Park, Baroness Park of Monmouth	Principal; Somerville College, Oxford; 1989–1996	Succeeded by Fiona Caldicott
