= Prior Scientific =

British manufacturer of optical microscopes

Prior Scientific Instruments
- Type: Corporation
- Industry: Scientific instrumentation
- Founded: 1919; 107 years ago in London, UK
- Founder: Walter Robert Prior
- Headquarters: Cambridge, UK
- Key people: Tom Freda, CEO Stuart Jarvis, CTO Simon Smith, CFO
- Products: Microscope automation, optical microscopy, telecommunications products, OEM design & manufacture
- Number of employees: 100
- Website: Prior Website

Prior Scientific Instruments Ltd. was established in London in 1919 as a manufacturer of optical microscopes. It is the last traditional microscope manufacturer of makers such as Vickers, W. Watson and Son, Baker, Charles Perry, Cooke, Troughton & Simms and many others who have ceased to produce microscopes.

== History ==
=== Early history ===
W. R. Prior & Co. Ltd. (W. R. Prior) was founded by Walter Robert Prior and Andrew Physicks in 1919. The Blitz in 1941 destroyed the factory building, so the company moved to their new facility in Bishop's Stortford in 1942. Many records and a collection of microscopes from the early days of the company were lost in a fire in 1988, but some illustrated catalogues have survived which give an indication of the range of instruments produced by W. R. Prior over the years.

W. R. Prior's offices were originally located at 9,10,11 Eagle Street, Holborn, London and later at 28a Devonshire Street, London W1. Little is known about the company during this time, and no records or catalogues exist as to when, and why they began to produce microscopes under the Prior name.

A W. R. Prior catalogue of microscopes and accessories dated February 1950 gives the location of the office as Devonshire Street and the factory as Bishop's Stortford, Herts. England (13 Northgate End) where manufacturing was carried out from 1942-1957.

=== Wartime ===
The Eagle Street factory was destroyed during the London Blitz and the company relocated to 13 Northgate End, Bishop's Stortford, Herts. The building was a garage and work began producing optical gun sights, tank periscopes, and range finders for the Ministry of Defence. No microscopes were produced during the war.

The first post-war abridged catalogue includes a wood block illustration of a student "C" limb microscope, with the limb engraved with the Eagle Street address.

=== Post-war ===
On 10 January 1947, Walter Robert Prior died at the age of 55.

1953 brought the start of manufacturing micromanipulators for Prior, and later the micropositioner was developed.

The company relocated to a new factory at London Road, Bishop's Stortford in 1956 and continued to produce and develop microscopes. Because of the need for new universities and colleges during the post-war period, there was a demand for microscopes and accessories, so Prior developed instruments for this market. The Science Master Microscope, introduced in 1957, was used in schools. The established Prior Monocular Dissecting Microscope was supplied for educational use.

For the Imperial Cancer Research Fund in London, 1962, Prior supplied a Modular Inverted Microscope housed in a temperature controlled cabinet for cell culture examination. The provision of a cine camera enabled continuous or time-lapse cine-photography to be carried out. The Cinemicroscope was adaptable for still photography or closed circuit television. This microscope was one of the fore-runners of the modern inverted microscope, which is commonly used in cell biology and tissue culture work today. A Prior Tissue Culture Chamber was also supplied and enabled work to be carried out when using an inverted or standard erect microscope.

=== 1970-2000 ===
In 1978, W. R. Prior & Co.Ltd. was acquired by The Gwyndann Group of Companies. The company name was changed in 1979 to Prior Scientific Instruments Ltd. (Prior).

Throughout the 1970s, Prior continued to launch new microscope models, including the Priorlux laboratory microscope in 1970 and the Student 400 series, designed for young scientists, in 1975.

In 1981, Prior Scientific Instruments Ltd. merged with James Swift and Son Ltd. James Swift & Son was founded in 1854, producing student and research polarising microscopes. The Swift Point Counter complemented the polarising microscope range and was sold worldwide. The James Swift factory was initially at Basingstoke, Hants. It was closed after a year and the company joined Prior Scientific Instruments at London Road, Bishop's Stortford.

Also in 1981, Prior launched a modular series of stereomicroscopes: the S2000 series. The intention was that this instrument would replace and upgrade the Stereomaster microscope. The design had been based on that of an operating microscope featuring a long working distance. It also had a tumbler rotating magnification system and a common objective. The design was a complete deviation from that of the previous Prior Greenough type microscope.

In 1984, Prior collaborated with British Telecom to produce the first hand-held fibre optic inspection microscope. Prior then embarked on further development of fibre optic inspection systems for other customers, including automated production systems with integrated image analysis.

In 1987, Prior started the development of an automated high speed XY microscope stage for the Milk Marketing Board. This stage was used in the screening of bacteria in milk samples. Prior soon identified the wider market potential of the automated microscope stage and embarked on the development of motorised systems for light microscope applications.

Fire at the Bishop's Stortford factory in 1988 meant the company had to relocate to its present site in Fulbourn, Cambridge, England, offering precision mechanical engineering, optics, electronics and precision assembly.

Expanding its operations further, the company opened a new office in 1991, Prior Scientific Inc, based in Rockland near Boston, USA.

=== 2000-present day ===
In, 2008 Prior GMBH in Jena, Germany, in 2010 Prior KK in Tokyo, Japan and in 2018 Prior China in Suzhou China.

In 2008, Prior opened Prior Scientific GmbH in Jena, Germany, and in 2010 Prior KK opened in Tokyo, Japan. In 2018, Prior China opened in Suzhou, China.

Prior acquired Queensgate Instruments in May 2018. Founded by Paul Atherton, Queensgate manufactures high-speed, high-precision piezo stages and capacitive sensors with low picometre resolutions.

This acquisition led Prior to expand its offering to nanopositioning, which is used in highly demanding microscopy environments. These include validating and testing semiconductor materials, as well as identifying new diseases and pathogens, and bringing new imaging technologies to market.

The company celebrated its 100-year anniversary in 2019. Following the launch of the PureFocus850 laser autofocus system in 2019, the OpenStand modular imaging system in 2020 and the SL160 Slide Loader in 2022.

Prior acquired Kinetic Systems, Inc., (Kinetic Systems) in September 2025. Based in Boston, Massachusetts, Kinetic Systems manufactures vibration isolation systems and optical tables, specialising in the research, semiconductor, aerospace and precision manufacturing markets. Vibration isolation systems add stability in applications where micro-vibrations can compromise results, including lasers, photonics and life sciences. The acquisition's focus is on market expansion and product development across the US and EMEA regions.

== Products ==
Prior Scientific Instruments Ltd. offers customisation, product design and manufacturing services alongside its extensive product range, which includes:

- Precision motorised stages for microscopes and industrial systems
- Laser autofocus systems
- Microscope automation products (motorised microscope stages, automated focus mechanisms, filter wheels, shutters, illumination systems and automated slide loading systems)
