= National Support Teams =

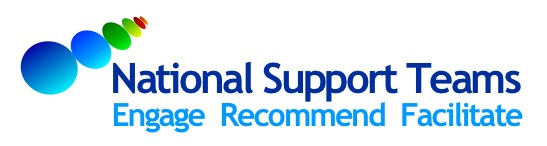

The public health National Support Teams or NSTs constituted a consultancy-style organisational development and change management service provided by the UK Government Department of Health.

== History and role ==
Established in 2006, they provided consultancy-style support and assistance to local health economies across England (the UK's devolved administrations – Scotland, Wales and Northern Ireland generally having their own arrangements). Each team had access to national-level expertise on specific public health specialisms, including:

- Sexual health
- Tobacco control
- Health inequalities
- Teenage pregnancy
- Childhood obesity
- Alcohol harm reduction
- Infant mortality
- Response to sexual violence
- Vaccination and immunisation
- Children and young peoples' emotional well-being and mental health

Consultancy and support services were provided free of charge to public-sector clients including local authorities and NHS Trusts. The feedback reports generated as a result of these activities were not published by the Department of Health, although some clients choose to post reports on their own websites.

Each national support team also shared observations with central Government policy advisers on the real-world public health challenges it identified through this work.

== Activity ==
The primary activity of each Team was to carry out visiting inputs to local areas across England, more than 450 of which were undertaken during the existence of the NSTs. These visits lasted between two days and one week, using a mix of in-house NST experts and externally sourced advisers where appropriate. Subsequent change management support was offered as appropriate to the changes recommended, often around strengthening strategic coherence, enhancing commissioning capabilities to respond to public health challenges, or improving operational effectiveness of treatment and/or behaviour change services.

== Approach ==
The overall style of the national support teams was planned to be in line with Peter Block's 'Flawless Consulting' approach. The diagnostic model employed was broadly influenced by appreciative inquiry, due to its tested relevance to healthcare environments and the emphasis upon positive potential to enhance organisational function (rather than a performance management approach, which initial client feedback suggested would be perceived as judgemental). Recommendations for change were presented at closing plenary sessions to both senior leadership and operational managers with sufficient detail to trigger follow-up action and a delivery style reported by audiences as more memorable than was initially expected of an organisational development input.

== Publications ==
NSTs created and published a range of practical guides to achieve public health improvements (several titled as 'high impact changes' guides) as well as summaries of applied learning from their reviews and support work in localities across England. Several of these remain available on the Department of Health website, and a wider range is available from the digital legacy site hosted by the National Archives. The feedback from NSTs to central Government policy teams also informed (and in some cases instigated) the publication of other policy documents including 'white papers' outlining proposed strategic improvements to overall action on public health.

== Reception ==
As outlined in the NSTs' own end-of-project report (available at the Department for Health website) the NSTs achieved significant results in strengthening the performance of a diverse range of NHS and local government public health interventions, resulting in high approval levels on the part of chief executives and directors of public health who considered this to have been one of the most useful services which the Department of Health had made available.

== Closure ==
All teams closed in March 2011 as a result of the funding cuts affecting several areas of the public sector in the UK, following a perceived need to reduce public expenditure during the 2008 financial crisis and related recession. Internal communications to NST staff explained the closure as the result of a decision to abolish all posts not covered by a traditional civil service employment contract; as this included almost all NST employees, the service was to close as a consequence – it was stressed that closure was not intended to imply a comment on the success or usefulness of the NST approach.

== Subsequent reputation ==
Specialist medical magazine GP reported the regret voiced by public health leaders following the closure of the NSTs in August 2011. Their stories subsequently picked up by The Daily Telegraph newspaper and BBC News explained how the services of NSTs had been received and questioned the rationale for disbanding them. In response, an unidentified Department of Health spokesperson suggested that the teams were no longer required as they had worked to targets discarded by the incoming new national administration in May 2010, although the teams had continued to provide services used by localities and intelligence brought back into central Government for the rest of that financial year; the spokesperson did not suggest a new means by which continuing aspirations to address public health challenges could now be supported.
