= Landmark International School =

Location
- 9, Church Lane; Fulbourn; Cambridge, Cambridgeshire, CB21 5EP; United Kingdom; 52.1839°N 0.2224°E

Information
- Type: Independent school (UK)
- Established: September 2016
- Local authority: Cambridgeshire
- Department for Education URN: 142776 Tables
- Ofsted: Reports
- Chairman of Governors: Jonathan Barker
- Head teacher: Gareth Turnbull-Jones
- Gender: Mixed
- Age: 6 to 16
- Enrolment: 70 as of September 2017
- Website: https://landmarkinternationalschool.co.uk/

Landmark International School is a mixed non-selective international school for children aged 6 to 16 located in Fulbourn village, on the outskirts of Cambridge, Cambridgeshire, England. It opened in September 2016 with a mission to give a creative education with unrivalled pastoral care, inclusivity and breadth of experience for its pupils. The school roll has since expanded from the initial 40 pupils to 70 at the beginning of its second year.

It was inspected by Ofsted in March 2017 and was graded Good in all areas.
