= Patient Information Advisory Group =

The Patient Information Advisory Group (PIAG) was established in the United Kingdom under section 61 of the Health and Social Care Act 2001 and the Patient Information Advisory Group (Establishment) Regulations 2001 to provide advice on issues of national significance involving the use of patient information and to oversee arrangements created under section 60 of the Act. Its membership was drawn from patient groups, health care professionals and regulatory bodies. Following the implementation of the Health and Social Care Act 2008, PIAG was abolished and its responsibilities transferred to a new body, the National Information Governance Board for Health and Social Care, with effect from January 2009.

== Terms of reference ==
The terms of reference for the PIAG were to:

1. Advise the Secretary of State on use of powers provided by section 60 of the Health and Social Care Act 2001, and in particular on:
  - applications and proposals for use of these powers;
  - draft regulations made under s60(1) of the Act;
  - proposals to vary or revoke such regulations following the Secretary of State's required annual review of existing provisions.
2. Advise the Secretary of State on key issues, particularly those of national significance, relating to the processing of patient information.

== Legal framework ==
Section 60 of the Health and Social Care Act 2001 (subsequently Section 251 of the NHS Act 2006) provided a power to ensure that patient identifiable information needed to support essential NHS activity could be used without the consent of patients. The power could only be used to support medical purposes that were in the interests of patients or the wider public, where consent was not a practicable alternative and where anonymised information would not suffice. It was intended largely as a transitional measure whilst consent or anonymisation procedures were developed, and this was reinforced by the need to review each use of the power annually.

This was developed to cover situations where informed consent could not be obtained, for example research projects of such a size as to make contacting each patient impracticable, where the public good derived from the research was agreed to outweigh the individual right to privacy.
