= Isabelle Trowler =

Chief social worker for children and families in England

- Occupation: Social worker
- Known for: Chief social worker for children and families in England

Isabelle Trowler is a British social worker. In 2013, she was appointed as chief social worker for children and families in England.

== Career ==
Trowler qualified as a social worker at the London School of Economics, gaining a master's in social policy and social work. She was taught by Eileen Munro. Trowler has worked for the Royal Borough of Kensington and Chelsea and the London Borough of Hackney. She was assistant director of children's services in Hackney, and was one of the staff who established the Reclaiming Social Work model used there. After leaving Hackney, she worked independently as a freelance social worker, setting up the social enterprise Morning Lane Associates with Steve Goodman, also an ex-director of Hackney.

The post of chief social worker was created in 2011 following the Munro review of child protection in 2011.

In 2015, following the closure of the College of Social Work, the Department for Education (DfE) awarded a contract for accreditation of social workers to a group including Trowler's previous consultancy, Morning Lane Associates. The decision was criticised as a potential conflict of interest, given Trowler's post as chief social worker. Although "Trowler herself took several actions to mitigate any potential conflict of interest in her new post", the DfE was found to have made errors in its handling of the situation, particularly related to recording. David Brindle, writing in The Guardian, said that "there is no suggestion that Trowler played any part in the decision and she retains no personal financial interest in Morning Lane".

Trowler was involved in the passing of the Children and Social Work Act 2017. She tabled an amendment to clarify that the Bill was not intended to "incentivise the privatisation of services".

In 2023, Trowler deactivated her account on Twitter after "weeks of abusive messages from people calling for her resignation".

Trowler has said that it is "important [for social workers] to remain calm and keep being kind and warm, even when things are really difficult in a family’s life". She has also said of recording in social work that she wishes "I'd known sooner how important it is that you think about what you write and how you write it, and the impact it can have. ... You become part of the story of people's lives and the narrative you create about families is extremely powerful". Trowler has written that "we expect our social workers" to be "skilled and wise", and that "with such a chequered recent history, [social workers] have to earn that public trust before we can expect to be given the professional freedoms we crave".

== Books ==
Trowler and her colleage Steve Goodman wrote Social Work Reclaimed: Innovative Frameworks for Child and Family Social Work Practice, published in 2011 by Jessica Kingsley Publishers. A review in The British Journal of Social Work concluded "this book provides a good discussion of the positives in the reclaiming model, and certainly deserves to be read. However, more could have been made about possible dangers", particularly relating to use of the model by profit-making companies.

== Recognition ==
In the 2024 New Year Honours, Trowler was made Commander of the Order of the British Empire (CBE) for services to children's social care.
