= Zouches Manor =

Former Anglo-Saxon manor in Cambridgeshire, England

Coordinates: 52.1836°N 0.2338°E

Zouches Manor (also Zouches Castle) was an Anglo-Saxon moated manor in Fulbourn Fen, a Site of Special Scientific Interest in the village of Fulbourn, Cambridgeshire, England. It is one of the historic Five Manors of Fulbourn and recorded to have existed 1066 AD to 1539 AD.

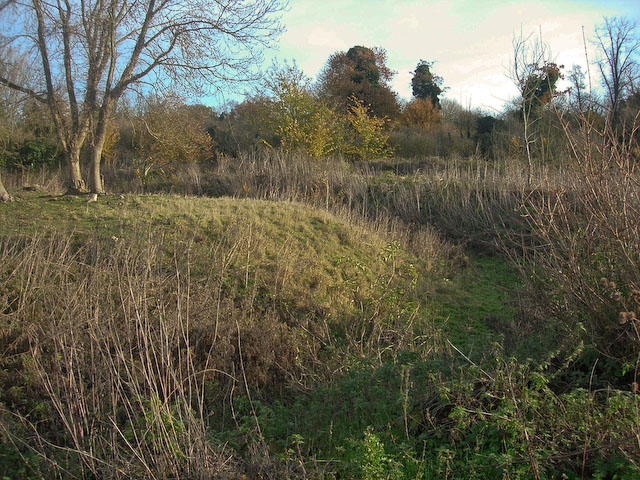
Moat of the former Zouches Castle.

== Creation ==
The manor was built by Alan la Zouche, Earl of Brittany (the same family that held Ashby-de-la-Zouch in Leicestershire) in the 13th century on an earlier site. The moat ditch and platform are likely to have been constructed in the 12th or 13th century, obscuring who exactly built the structure.

It came in the hands of the Zouches in 1230, following peace with Brittany. Alan la Zouche, then viscount of Rohan, granted his Cambridgeshire lands to Roger la Zouch. The Zouches and their successors continued to hold Zouches Manor of the honour of Richmond into the 15th century in socage, rendering two gilt spurs yearly into the 15th century. After 1500 the tenure was reckoned as knight service.

== Dunmowes Manor ==
It later came into ownership by the Docwra family when it was known as Dunmowes Manor. There is ambiguity over whether Zouches Manor and Dunmowes Manor are the same or whether the latter was built by the Dockra family in the 16th century on the site of the former. The Dockra (or Docwra) family has extensive history in the area.

Dunmowes Manor took its name from the Norman surname Dunmowe (Saxon 'Dommauua', modern English 'Dunmall'). The Domesday Book recorded the family as holders of a family seat as Lords of the Manor of Dunmow. It is unclear if this is Dunmowes Manor in Fulbourn or the Essex villages 30 miles away at Great Dunmow and Little Dunmow.

== Location ==
The location commands access to the village and the upland areas from The Fens and was probably chosen to defend against attack from the Fens during troubles such as the First Barons' War in the 13th century and the battles between the Romano-British (to the south), Anglo-Saxons (in East Anglia) and Belgae & Norman invaders.

The site has been extensively archaeologically researched.
