= 1862 Grand National =

English steeplechase horse race

- Grand National
- Location: Aintree
- Date: 12 March 1862
- Winning horse: (Republic of Ireland) The Huntsman
- Starting price: 3/1 F
- Jockey: Harry Lamplugh
- Trainer: Harry Lamplugh
- Owner: (France) Viscount de Namur
- Conditions: Good (good to firm in places)

The 1862 Grand National was the 24th renewal of the Grand National horse race that took place at Aintree near Liverpool, England, on 12 March 1862.

The race was marred by the only recorded human fatality in the history of the race when Joseph Wynne suffered chest injuries from which he died hours after the race.

== The Course ==
This year the natural fences, which numbered around eight, while being described as small, all had more posts and rails added to them to make the fence more of a challenge. First circuit: Starting from the field used every year since 1851, Fence 1 {15} Bank, Fence 2 {16} Hedge, Ditch and Cop, Fence 3 {17} Post and Rails, Fence 4 {18} Rails and Ditch, Fence 5 {19} Becher's Brook, Fence 6 {20} Post and Rails, Fence 7 {21} Post and Rails Fence 8 {22} Hedge and Ditch, often referred to as the Canal Turn in previous years, Fence 9 {23} Valentine's Brook, Fence 10 {24} Ditch and Quickset, Fence 11 {25} Post and Rails, Fence 12 {26} Stump Hedge and Ditch.

The runners then crossed the lane at the canal bridge to re-enter the racecourse proper, turning at the first opportunity towards the fences in front of the stands. Fence 13 Gorse Hurdle, Fence 14 Artificial Brook.

Second circuit: The runners then turned away from the Grandstands again and crossed what had been known in the 1850s as Proceed's Lane, following the same circuit until reaching the racecourse again. This time the runners continued to the wider extreme of the course before turning to run up the straight in front of the stands where Fence 27 Hurdle had to be jumped.

The runners then bypassed the Gorsed Hurdle and Artificial brook inside before reaching the winning post in front of the Main Stand.

== Build up and leading contenders ==
During the previous decade, some sporting newspapers had argued that the race was declining, citing the increasing number of lower-weighted horses and entrants from flat racing. Reports also criticised the practice of entering a strongly favoured horse to influence the odds on another horse from the same stable before withdrawing it. In 1862, several leading contenders, including the previous year’s winner, Jealousy, were withdrawn during the final 48 hours. This left the smallest field in the race’s history at that time.[4]

The Huntsman at 3/1 favourite was already considered far and away the best example of a hunter chaser in the country and had already been second and third in his two previous attempts. Since then the horse had been relocated to France to be trained by Englishman Harry Lamplugh and was bidding to be the first horse trained outside the United Kingdom to win the race. With the withdrawal of most of his major rivals, not least Jealousy victory was seen by many as a foregone conclusion. Harry Lamplugh, second in the race three years earlier, trained the horse and took him as his eighth attempt to win. Fears of more skulduggery briefly crossed Aintree when his race number wasn't initially added to the race board, but these were quickly dismissed.

Thomastown was sent off at 6/1 as one of only two Irish entries, in so doing carrying almost all the Irish money backed on the course. The press were less enthusiastic of his chances, one describing him as a pig of a horse. although others noted that his preliminary canter did his trainer credit For James Murphy it was a second ride in the race.

Anatis as a former winner had natural appeal at 8/1 and was partnered again, as in all her previous three runs, by Tommy Pickernell. Her critics questioned whether she was past her best at the advancing age of twelve.

Bridegroom at 9/1 gained particular favour with the Liverpool crowd as one of the best turned out entries, although concerns were felt in the crowd when the horse was saddled away from the paddock and did not parade with the other runners. Ben Land toom the mount, his fourth having previously steered The Huntsman round to be third three years earlier.

Harry was backed at 10/1 almost as soon as it became clear George Stevens would be in the saddle earlier in the week. This would be his seventh ride in the race, having won six years earlier.

== The Race ==
As if to sum up a race that had been highly criticised already, the start was a ragged one with Bridegroom got the best start while The Poet was left hopelessly and appeared reluctant to start at all, a fact confirmed by his subsequent refusal at the first fence. Thomastown followed suit at the second while Tattler took the same example at the third, though the latter continued to the fence after Bechers Brook, by which time Ben Land was in great pain after being struck in the face by a flying stone. Tatlers refusal here, which almost brought down Bucephalus ended their participation.

Willoughby was now leading Bridegroom with the usual front runner, Xanthus also in his expected position with Huntsman, Harry, Romeo, Anatis, O'Connell and Playman all in close attendance. These nine continued together up the canal side and back on to the course to complete the first circuit, with Stevens taking Harry to the front over the Gorsed Hurdle. Willoughby blundered here while Joseph Wynne on board O'Connell appeared unable to summon the strength to get his mount over the jump, hitting it and Willoughby hard, ensuring that both came down. Wynne was pinned under his mount who also remained motionless while Playman added to the carnage when brought down, that horse then falling on the already prone O'Connell and injured jockey underneath. Wynne's badly injured body was pulled from under his mount and rushed for medical treatment to the Sefton Arms, though it was already clear his injuries appeared severe.

This left only seven runners in the race going onto the second circuit with Harry continuing to show the way down to Bechers in such good style that many were already hailing him the winner of the race. However, after taking the Canal Turn, Stevens was already aware his horse was in distress and it was Bridegroom, Huntsman and Romeo who led few survivors back towards the racecourse. Harry had by now broken down and was passed by Xanthus as he pulled up at the Anchor Bridge crossing with Anatis and Bucephalus by this time tailed off.

Romeo now appeared to be going the best of the leading trio but went the wrong side of the flag entering the racecourse, either due to the inexperience of his young rider Bennett or possibly having been barged wide by Bridegroom Either way, his chance of victory was gone and left the race as a duel between Huntsman and Bridegroom. The former clipped the final hurdle, which in previous years had cost him victory, but this time was sufficiently stronger than Bridegroom to have enough in reserve to win by four lengths, Romeo was twenty lengths further back in third with Xanthus the only other recorded finisher two lengths further behind. Stevens walked in Harry with Anatis and Bucephalus following.

== Finishing Order ==
Position	Name	Jockey	Handicap (st-lb)	SP	Distance	Colours
Winner	The Huntsman	Harry Lamplugh	11-0	3-1 Fav	9 mins 30 sec	Yellow, black piping and cap
Second	Bridegroom	Ben Land Jnr	10-13	10-1	4 Lengths	Pink and white stripes, white cap with pink piping
Third	Romeo	Charley Bennett	8-12	100-8	Took wrong course, anchor bridge 2nd time. 20 Lengths	Green, gold braid
Fourth and last	Xanthus	Richard Sherrard	9-6	25-1	2.5 Lengths	Pink and white sleeves, black cap
Fence 27 {Final Hurdle}	Anatis	Tommy Pickernell {rode under the name Mr Thomas}	10-12	9-1	Tailed off, Pulled Up	Brown, orange sleeves, red cap
Fence 27 {Final Hurdle}	Bucephalus	McGrillon	10-19	100-7	Took a short cut and walked in	Pink, green cap
Fence 27 {Final Hurdle}	Harry	George Stevens	9-5	10-1	Pulled Up, Broke Down	Black, purple cap
Fence 13 {Gorsed Hurdle}	O'Connell	Joe Wynne	9-8	33-1	Fell	Black, purple sleeves, black cap
Fence 13 {Gorsed Hurdle}	Playman	John Nightingall	10-8	25-1	Fell	Indigo
Fence 13 {Gorsed Hurdle}	Willoughby	H Alington {rode under the name Mr Lington}	10-0	20-1	Brought Down	White, light blue sleeves, red cap
Fence 6 {Post and Rails}	The Tattler	Charles Boyce	9-7	100-8	Refused fence 3, went on. Boyce injured when refused again	Rose and white stripes, black cap
Fence 2 {Hedge, Ditch and Cop}	Thomastown	James Murphy	10-4	6-1	Refused	Wine, blue sleeves, white cap
Fence 1 {Bank}	The Poet	Gaff	8-12	50-1	Refused, continued Tailed off until Fence 13	Black, orange cap

== Aftermath ==
Despite being attended to by three doctors, Joe Wynne never regained consciousness and died shortly after 8pm. At his inquest it was revealed that the 20 year old son of former winning National rider, Denny Wynne had been informed by the owner of O'Connell, Lord de Fryne that his sister had died in Ireland on the morning of the race. Wynne was offered the chance to stand down, with Walter White set to replace him. However the jockey, one of six making their Grand National debut advised the owner he had "Come so far to ride the horse." At his inquest it was reported that he was in a frail state due to consumption and appeared too weak to get his mount over the Gorsed Hurdle, resulting in the horse hitting the fence hard and then colliding with Willoughby. O'Connell fell heavily on the rider and it was initially thought the horse had broken his back when Playman fell on him. The weight of both horses on Wynne caused massive internal injuries and a crushed cheekbone, though he suffered no other broken bones. de Freyne had left the course before the race and wasn't aware of the incident, so friends began a collection for Wynne's widowed mother

Huntsmans racing career after the Grand National was brief, breaking down in his very next race, the Great North of England chase at Doncaster just two days later. The horse was retired to stud.
