= Fiona Caldicott =

British psychiatrist (1941–2021)

Dame Fiona Caldicott DBE FMedSci
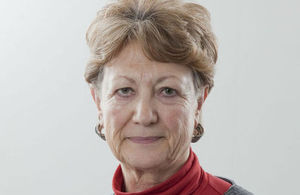
- Caldicott in 2014.
- Born: Fiona Soesan; 12 January 1941; Troon, Ayrshire, Scotland, UK
- Died: 15 February 2021 (aged 80); Warwick, England, UK
- Education: City of London School for Girls; St Hilda's College, Oxford
- Occupations: Psychiatrist, psychotherapist, lecturer, academic, and administrator
- Known for: Caldicott Report
- Spouse: Robert Gordon Woodruff Caldicott
- Children: 2

Dame Fiona Caldicott (née Soesan; 12 January 1941 – 15 February 2021) was a Scottish psychiatrist and psychotherapist who also served as Principal of Somerville College, Oxford. She was the National Data Guardian for Health and Social Care in England until her death.

== Early life and education ==
Caldicott was born on 12 January 1941 in Troon, daughter of barrister Joseph Maurice Soesan and civil servant Elizabeth Jane (née Ransley). Her paternal grandparents were greengrocers who were unenthusiastic about education; her father left school in his mid-teens, but subsequently completed a chemistry degree at night school and a law degree by correspondence. Caldicott was educated at City of London School for Girls, then studied medicine and physiology at St Hilda's College, Oxford, qualifying BM BCh in 1966.

== Career ==
Fiona Caldicott was Principal of Somerville College, Oxford, from 1996 to 2010 while also serving as Pro Vice-Chancellor, Personnel and Equal Opportunities, of the University of Oxford and chairing its Personnel Committee. She retired from her 10-year term as Chair at the Oxford University Hospitals NHS Trust in March 2019, having steered the organisation to Foundation Trust status. A past President of the British Association for Counselling and Psychotherapy, she was a Consultant and Senior Clinical Lecturer in Psychotherapy for the South Birmingham Mental Health NHS Trust from 1977 to 1996.

She was the first woman to be President of the Royal College of Psychiatrists (1993–96) and its first woman Dean (1990–93). From 2011 to 2013 she was Chair of the National Information Governance Board for Health and Social Care. Caldicott was Chair of the Academy of Medical Royal Colleges from 1995 to 1996.

Caldicott was a Fellow of the Royal College of Psychiatrists, Fellow of the Royal College of Physicians, Fellow of the Royal College of Physicians of Ireland, and a Fellow of the Royal College of General Practitioners, as well as being appointed a Fellow of the Academy of Medical Science in 1998.

=== Caldicott Committee ===
A review was commissioned by the Chief Medical Officer of England and Wales owing to increasing concern about the ways in which patient information is used in the NHS of England and Wales and the need to ensure that confidentiality is not undermined. Such concern was largely due to the development of information technology in the service, and its capacity to disseminate information about patients rapidly and extensively. In 1996, guidance on "the protection and use of patient information" was promulgated and there was a need to promote awareness of it at all levels in the NHS. It did not affect Scotland originally but they have recently adopted it. A main committee was set up under Caldicott's Chair and there were four separate working groups; the committee was known as the Caldicott Committee, responsible for reviewing all patient-identifiable information, which passes from NHS organisations to other NHS or non-NHS bodies for purposes other than direct care, medical research, or where there is a statutory requirement for information.

The committee was to consider each flow of patient-identifiable information and was to advise the NHS Executive whether patient identification was justified by the purpose and whether action to minimise risks of breach of confidentiality was desirable—for example, reduction, elimination, or separate storage of items of information. The report was published in December 1997.

Every NHS trust has a "Caldicott Guardian" to ensure that standards of patient confidentiality and the Caldicott principles are upheld.

=== National Data Guardian for Health and Social Care ===
Caldicott became the UK's first National Data Guardian for Health and Social Care in November 2014. In December 2018 the Health and Social Care (National Data Guardian) Act 2018 passed into law, and in April 2019 she was appointed the first statutory position holder by the Secretary of State for Health and Social Care, a position she held until her death in February 2021.

== Awards and honours ==
- Honorary Fellow, Somerville College, Oxford
- Honorary Fellow, St Hilda's College, Oxford, 1996
- Dame Commander of the Order of the British Empire, 15 June 1996.
- Lifetime Achievement Award from the Royal College of Psychiatrists, November 2018

== Personal life ==
In 1965, she married Robert Gordon Woodruff Caldicott, who ran his family's wine merchant business; they had two children.

Caldicott died on 15 February 2021 in Warwick, aged 80.

Academic offices
Preceded by Catherine Hughes	Principal; Somerville College, Oxford; 1996-2010	Succeeded by Alice Prochaska
