= The Huntsman (horse) =

British-bred Thoroughbred racehorse

- Sire: Tupsley
- Grandsire: Dr Faustus
- Dam: The Abbess
- Damsire: Young Augustus
- Sex: Stallion
- Foaled: 1853
- Country: Ireland
- Colour: Bay
- Owner: Viscount de Namur; Baron de la Motte
- Trainer: Harry Lamplugh

Major wins
- 1862 Grand National

The Huntsman was the winner of the 1862 Grand National steeplechase run on 12 March at Aintree near Liverpool, England. The winner was owned by Viscount de Namur and trained in France by Yorkshire born trainer Henry (Harry) Jeremiah Lamplugh who also chose to ride the horse himself. The Huntsman had previously finished third in the race in 1859 and second in 1860, being ridden in the latter race by the amateur jockey Thomas Townley.

The Huntsman had left Chantilly in February 1861 under the care of Lamplugh to spend a year at Doncaster preparing for the Grand National.

Thirteen ran, with the previous year's winner Jealousy being withdrawn on the morning of the race. The Huntsman came to the final fence with only one other horse in with a chance of beating him, Bridegroom, ridden by Richard Sherrard. The Huntsman had more to offer than his rival and went on up the run in to become the first French trained winner of the race. Five horses completed the course although the third placed Romeo had refused at the third last fence while fifth placed Bucephalus had been virtually brought down in the early stages and finished tailed off from his rivals.

The race of 1862 is remembered however for the only human fatality recorded in the Grand National. At the Chair fence situated in front of the grand stands two competitors collided before both fell. One of the riders, Joseph {Joe} Wynne, riding in his first National was crushed and was taken unconscious to the nearby Sefton Arms Inn where he died five hours later. Joe's father Dennis (Denny) had won the race as a jockey in 1847 but he himself had died in a fall in 1858.

Within a month of his victory, The Huntsman was taken back to France to the headquarters of his new owner, the Baron de la Motte, at the Imperial Haras [stud] at Abbeville. The Huntsman was to stand for his portrait by M. G. Parquet and then to be put to stud at Abbeville.
