= Department of Health and Social Care =

Ministerial department of the UK Government

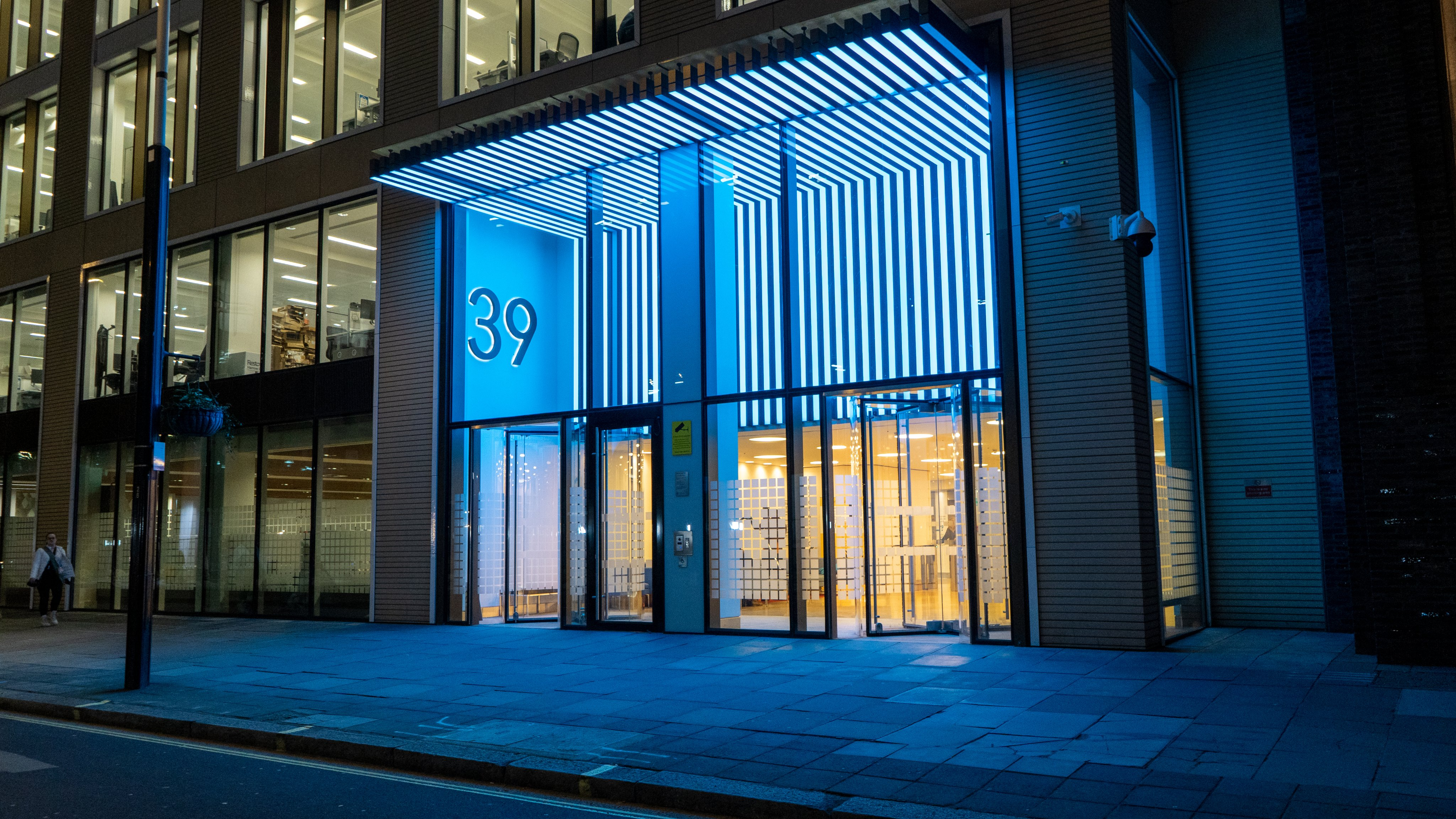
- 39 Victoria Street, Westminster

Department overview
- Formed: 1988
- Preceding Department: Department of Health and Social Security
- Jurisdiction: Government of the United Kingdom
- Headquarters: Victoria Street, London
- Employees: 1,588 directly employed by DHSC (2019/20); 1.4 million employed by NHS (England)
- Annual budget: £138.9 billion; 2020–21 ($185 billion)
- Secretary of State responsible: Yvette Cooper, Secretary of State for Health and Social Care
- Department executives: Samantha Jones, Permanent Secretary; Matthew Style, Interim Second Permanent Secretary and Chief Operating Officer
- Website: gov.uk/dhsc

- Applies to: England; United Kingdom (some reserved matter)
- Relates to: Health in England; Social care in England

Other UK counterparts
- Northern Ireland: Department of Health
- Scotland: Health and Social Care Directorates
- Wales: Welsh Government Health, Social Care and Early Years Group

The Department of Health and Social Care (DHSC) is a ministerial department of the Government of the United Kingdom. It is responsible for government policy on health and adult social care matters in England, along with a few elements of the same matters which are not otherwise devolved to the Scottish Government, Welsh Government or Northern Ireland Executive. It oversees the English National Health Service (NHS). The department is led by the Secretary of State for Health and Social Care with three ministers of state and three parliamentary under-secretaries of state.

The department develops policies and guidelines to improve the quality of care and to meet patient expectations. It carries out some of its work through arm's-length bodies (ALBs), including executive non-departmental public bodies such as NHS England and the NHS Digital, and executive agencies such as the UK Health Security Agency and the Medicines and Healthcare products Regulatory Agency (MHRA). The DHSC also manages the work of the National Institute for Health and Care Research (NIHR).

The expenditure, administration and policy of the department are scrutinised by the Health and Social Care Select Committee.

== History ==
Like many others, the department with responsibility for the nation's health has had different names and has included other functions at various times.

In the 19th century, several bodies were formed for specific consultative duties and were dissolved when they were no longer required. There were two incarnations of a Board of Health, in 1805 and 1831, and from 1854 to 1858 a General Board of Health reported directly to the Privy Council. Responsibility for health issues was also in part vested in local health boards, which existed from 1848 to 1894. In 1871, the Local Government Board was created to supervise such local functions as health and sanitation and also took over the functions of the Poor Law Board, which was abolished. The Public Health Act 1875 (38 & 39 Vict. c. 55) designated sanitary districts, which by the Local Government Act 1894 became rural and urban district councils. With the emergence of modern local government, some of its supervision was done by the Local Government Act Office, part of the Home Office.

The Ministry of Health Act 1919 abolished the Local Government Board and transferred its powers and duties to a new department called the Ministry of Health, which consolidated under a single authority the medical and public health functions of central government. This took on the medical duties of the Board of Education, the duties of the Privy Council under the Midwives Acts, the powers of the Home Secretary in relation to the Children Act 1908 (8 Edw. 7. c. 67), and the duties of the Insurance Commissioners and the Welsh Insurance Commissioners. In the early part of the 20th century, medical assistance had been provided through these National Health Insurance Commissions. Most of the Local Government Board staff transferred to the new ministry.

The co-ordination of local medical services was expanded in connection with emergency and wartime services, from 1935 to 1945, and these developments culminated in the establishment of the NHS in 1948.

In 1968, the Ministry of Health was dissolved and its functions transferred (along with those of the similarly dissolved Ministry of Social Security) to the newly created Department of Health and Social Security (DHSS). Twenty years later, in 1988, these functions were split back into two government departments, forming the Department of Social Security (DSS) and the Department of Health, formally created in through The Transfer of Functions (Health and Social Security) Order 1988.

It was only in April 2011 that the government committed to having a Director of Nursing in the Department of Health, ensuring that the nursing perspective would be incorporated into public health policy.

Following the 2018 British cabinet reshuffle, the department was renamed the Department of Health and Social Care.

== Location ==
The department's headquarters and ministerial offices are at 39 Victoria Street, London. The department moved from its previous location in Richmond House, Whitehall in November 2017. Its other principal offices are Skipton House (Elephant and Castle), Wellington House near Waterloo station and Quarry House in Leeds. Wellington House is now mainly occupied by staff from the department's arm's-length bodies. New King's Beam House near Blackfriars Bridge was formerly a Department of Health office prior to the expiry of its lease in October 2011. Alexander Fleming House, Hannibal House and Eileen House (all in Elephant and Castle) were previously used by the department. The archives are at Nelson, Lancashire.

== Ministers ==
The Department of Health and Social Care's ministers are as follows, with cabinet ministers in bold:

Minister	Portrait	Office	Portfolio
**Yvette Cooper MP**		Secretary of State for Health and Social Care	Responsible for the overall work of the Department of Health and Social Care, including overall financial control, oversight of NHS delivery and performance and oversight of social care policy.
Diana Johnson MP		Minister of State for Public Health and Patient Safety	Responsible for health improvement, secondary prevention and screening, health inequalities, children’s health, health protection, patient safety, neighbourhood health, community healthcare, general practice, and pharmacy.
Alison McGovern MP		Minister of State for Social Care	Responsible for adult social care, hospital discharge, frailty and dementia, end of life and palliative care, disabilities and SEND (special educational needs and disabilities), mental health, and work and health.
Karin Smyth MP		Minister of State for Health (Secondary Care)	Responsible for NHS secondary care, NHS workforce, NHS capital, land and estates, NHS finance, urgent and emergency care, health and social care integration, and devolution in England.
Chris McDonald MP		Minister of State for Science, innovation and Investment	Office for Life Sciences. Jointly with Department for Business, Innovation, Science and Trade
James Frith MP		Parliamentary Under-Secretary of State for Health Innovation	Responsible for NHS data and technology, medtech (medical technology), medicines, research and innovation, rare diseases, major and long-term conditions, international and devolved governments, men’s health, dentistry, and eyecare.
Gillian Merron, Baroness Merron		Parliamentary Under-Secretary of State for Women's Health and Maternity	Responsible for women’s health, maternity, early years, violence against women and girls, sexual health and HIV, gender, reproductive health, offender health, and UK Covid-19 Inquiry.

== Senior personnel ==
=== Permanent secretaries ===
The Permanent Secretary at the Department of Health and Social Care is Samantha Jones, who was appointed in 2025.

=== Chief professional officers ===
The department has six chief professional officers who provide it with expert knowledge and also advise the Ministers, other government departments and the Prime Minister. The Chief Medical Officer and Chief Nursing Officer are also directors of the department's board.

Position	Holder	Date of appointment
Chief Medical Officer for England (CMO)	Professor Chris Whitty	Oct 2019
Chief Nursing Officer (CNO)	Duncan Buryon	2024
Chief Scientific Officer (CSO)	Professor Sue Hill	2002
Chief Dental Officer for England (CDO)	Jason Wong	2023
Chief Allied Health Professions Officer (CAHPO)	Professor Suzanne Rastrick	2014
Chief Pharmaceutical Officer	David Webb	2022
Chief Social Worker for Adults	Vacant	
Chief Social Worker for Children and Families (Role jointly under Department of Education).	Isabelle Trowler	2013

== Arm's-length bodies (ALBs) ==
The department acts as a 'steward' for the health and adult social care system in England and oversees fifteen arm's-length bodies (ALBs):

=== Executive agencies ===
The department has two executive agencies:

- The Medicines and Healthcare products Regulatory Agency has the specialist role of assessing, licensing and regulating medicines and medical devices for use in the United Kingdom.
- Until 1 April 2021, Public Health England was responsible for delivering public health improvement through prevention and awareness raising and protection. It was replaced by a new agency UK Health Security Agency since April 2021, and became fully operational in October 2021.

=== Executive non-departmental public bodies ===
The department has thirteen executive non-departmental public bodies:

United Kingdom

- Human Tissue Authority regulates the use of human tissue in research and therapeutic treatments across the United Kingdom.
- Human Fertilisation and Embryology Authority, which regulates and inspects in vitro fertilisation, artificial insemination and the storage of human eggs, sperm or embryos. It also regulates human embryo research.

England and Wales

- NHS Blood and Transplant, which is responsible for the supply of blood, organs, tissues and stem cells; their donation, storage and transportation.
- National Institute for Health and Care Excellence (NICE), which provides advice on treatment procedures and assesses healthcare interventions for cost-effectiveness.
- The NHS Business Services Authority provides business support services to NHS organisations, including the administration of the NHS pension scheme.

England only

- Care Quality Commission (CQC) has the primary function of inspecting providers of health and adult social care in England, ensuring that they meet essential standards of safety and quality.
- NHS Digital, which provides statistical information and informatics support to the health and care system in England.
- Health Education England is responsible for ensuring enough high-quality training is available to develop the healthcare workforce.
- NHS England oversees the NHS in England, commissions specialised healthcare services and primary care services and oversees clinical commissioning groups and as of 1 April 2019 (formalised in June 2022,) oversees NHS trusts and foundation trusts in England, due to a merger with NHS Improvement which itself was only formed in April 2016 by combining:
  - Monitor, which oversaw foundation trusts and applications from NHS trusts seeking foundation trust status. It also had the new role of examining pricing and competition in the NHS.
  - NHS Trust Development Authority had the function of helping NHS trusts achieve successful applications for foundation trust status.
- Health Research Authority protects and promotes the interests of patients and the public in health research.
- NHS Resolution, handles negligence claims and helps the NHS learn lessons from claims to improve patient and staff safety.
- NHS Counter Fraud Authority, tasked with leading the fight against NHS Fraud and corruption.

== Criticism ==
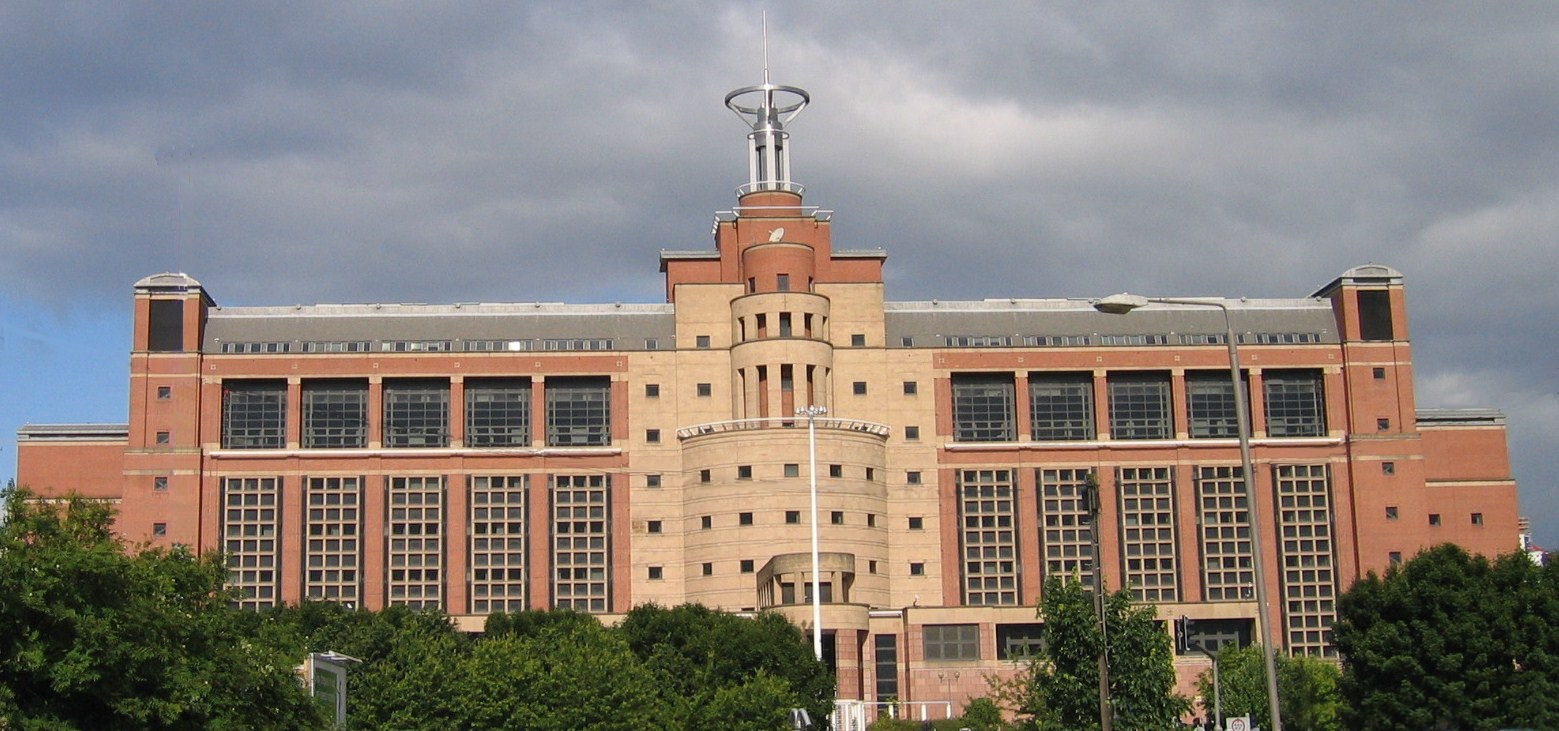
Quarry House: a DH building shared with the Department for Work and Pensions at Quarry Hill, Leeds (known locally as 'The Kremlin').

=== Introduction of user charges for NHS services ===
The publication of Professor Lord Darzi's review of the NHS prompted criticism of the government and the Department of Health, claiming that it paved the way for user charging, and so contradicting the NHS Plan 2000 which stated that "user charges are unfair and inequitable in they increase the proportion of funding from the unhealthy, old and poor compared with the healthy, young and wealthy". The report also introduces the concept of personal budgets.

=== Fragmentation of NHS services ===
Darzi's report splits previously integrated services into 'core', 'additional' and 'enhanced' services, which critics say will lead to abandoning the open-ended duty of care on which the NHS was founded.

=== "Superbugs" and PFI ===
Fatal outbreaks of antibiotic-resistant bacteria ("superbugs"), such as methicillin-resistant Staphylococcus aureus (MRSA) and Clostridioides difficile, in NHS hospitals has led to criticism in 2008 of the department's decision to outsource cleaning via private finance initiative contracts as "cutting corners on cleaning".

A "Deep Clean" initiative announced by the Department of Health was criticised by infection control experts and by the Lancet as a gimmick which failed to address the causes of in-hospital infections, by the firms doing the work as an attempt to avoid paying for regular better cleaning, and by NHS managers as ineffective.

It also attracted criticism because only a quarter of the £60 million funding for the scheme went to hospitals, and because a number of hospitals missed the completion target, and as of June 2008 one in four NHS trusts was not meeting the government's standards on hygiene.

=== Prescribing ===
Its advice to primary care on prescribing drugs such as proton pump inhibitors has been criticised as wasteful.

=== Medical training ===
The DH has attracted criticism for its handling of the outcome of Modernising Medical Careers, in particular in the changes it made to the specialist training of doctors and the Medical Training Application Service (MTAS). These changes left "29,193 junior doctors from the UK and overseas... chasing 15,600 posts..." and resulted in accusations that the DH had broken the law by refusing to reveal scores to candidates. Ultimately there was a judicial review and a boycott of the system by senior doctors across the country. MTAS was eventually scrapped and Patricia Hewitt, the then Secretary of State for Health, resigned following accusations that she had lied to the House of Commons over the system. Even after the abolition of MTAS, anger among the medical profession continued, with the British Medical Association commenting of the DH response that "Not only is this response too late, it does not go far enough".

The official government inquiry into MMC recommended that the responsibility for medical training be removed from the DH.

=== Recurrent NHS reorganisation ===
Successive DH ministerial teams have been criticised for repeated reorganisations of the NHS in England, where primary care commissioning responsibility, in particular, has been allocated to four different sets of organisations in the last ten years: PCGs, small area primary care trusts (PCTs) (e.g. covering a rural local authority district or part of a city), larger-area PCTs (e.g. covering a whole county), PCT clusters (e.g. quarter of London or South of Tyne and Wear) and the currently unspecified Clinical Commissioning Groups. The tendency to introduce each reorganisation before its predecessor has had time to settle down and generate improved performance has attracted censure amongst healthcare professions in the UK and beyond, including reference to the ironic concept of 'redisorganisation'.

Andrew Lansley's promise before the 2010 general election not to impose top-down reorganisation, followed by the instigation from ministerial level of one of the most fundamental NHS reorganisations yet envisaged, has generated especially widespread opprobrium, although some commentators have also suggested that this is to some extent completing the job started under the Blair administration. The NHS as of 1 April 2013 is no longer situated within the DH, as NHS England also went 'live' at the same time. Therefore, the DH has a further scrutiny role of NHS services and commissioning.

== Information technology ==
In recent years, the Department of Health and the NHS have come under considerable scrutiny for its use of IT. Since being elected to power in 1997 the Labour government had sought to modernise the NHS through the introduction of IT. Although the policy is correct in aim, many claim its execution is lacking.

In September 2008, a new leadership team was established, CIO for Health, Christine Connelly, and director of programme and system delivery Martin Bellamy. Previous CIO Richard Granger was believed to have been the most highly paid civil servant in the UK and was a controversial figure. Connelly left the DH for a position in the Cabinet Office in June 2009 and was replaced by Tim Donohoe and Carol Clarke.

Connelly's role was to "deliver the Department's overall information strategy and integrating leadership across the NHS", according to the DH's website. That strategy, known as the National Programme for IT, is intended to do nothing less than revolutionise NHS information workflow and is costed at about £12.7 billion. The success or otherwise of Connelly's reign will be based on her promise to end delays of electronic medical records. She has said that if there is not clear progress by November 2009, a new plan could be hatched.

On the eve of the departure of Fujitsu as an outsourcing partner, Connelly said in April 2009 that she would open up sourcing to competition at "acute" sites in the south of England and offer toolkits by March 2010 to allow more local configuration of systems.

In January 2009, MPs criticised DH for its confidentiality agreement with key supplier CSC and in March the department was admonished by the Information Commissioner for its records management. In May 2011, Prime Minister David Cameron announced that he was considering scrapping the project.

In 2022, Sajid Javid launched the Plan for Digital Health and Social Care, which includes "regulatory levers" will be used to: "signal that digitisation is a priority, identify the non-negotiable standards of digital capability, [and] explain how we will monitor and support compliance". Integrated care systems will be required to put in place a joined-up health and social care record by March 2025 in which all clinical teams will have access to a complete view of a person's record that they can contribute to. In 2022 86% of trusts had "some form of electronic patient record" but only 45% of social care providers used a digital social care record, and 23% of care home staff cannot access the internet consistently. The NHS app is to be a "digital front door" for patients, with increasing functionality to be added and remote consultations with GPs are to be encouraged. £25 million is to be provided in 2022/23 to support the rapid digitisation of social care, including adopting Digital Social Care Records.

== 2010–2011 staffing cuts ==
In response to Government spending reduction targets following the 2008 financial crisis and recession, DH in common with several other Government Departments resorted to large-scale staffing reductions. In order to minimise redundancy costs, the predominant impact was upon DH staff not employed through a traditional civil service 'headcount' contract, with a resultant emphasised effect upon more recent or innovative work-streams dependent upon seconded or externally hosted staff. This has attracted criticism from several of the professional and patient communities of interest concerned, for instance as regards the impact upon Improving Access to Psychological Therapies (IAPT) and the withdrawal of the practical assistance available to the NHS and local authorities via the national support teams.

== Devolution ==
Most aspects of health policy in Scotland, Wales and Northern Ireland are devolved to the department's counterparts:

- the Scottish Government's Health and Social Care Directorates
- the Welsh Government's Health, Social Care and Early Years Group
- the Northern Ireland Executive's Department of Health

The comparability factor (the proportion of spending in this area which is devolved) was 99.5% for all three countries for 2021/22.

A number of health issues are, however, wholly or partly reserved to Westminster:

=== Scotland ===
- regulation of the health professions
- xenotransplantation
- embryology, surrogacy and human genetics
- human fertilisation
- medicines, medical supplies and poisons

=== Wales ===
- regulation of the health professions
- abortion
- xenotransplantation
- embryology, surrogacy and human genetics
- medicines, medical supplies and poisons

=== Northern Ireland ===
- xenotransplantation
- surrogacy
- human fertilisation and embryology
- human genetics

In Northern Ireland, abortion law is a criminal justice matter and is devolved.

== See also ==
- Government of the United Kingdom
- Budget of the United Kingdom
- Healthcare in the United Kingdom
- Health in the United Kingdom
- National Data Guardian for Health and Social Care
