= Alan la Zouche (died 1270) =

Anglo-Norman nobleman and soldier (1205–1270)

Alan la Zouche (1205–1270) was an Anglo-Norman nobleman and soldier of Breton descent. He built the Zouches Manor in Cambridgeshire. He was Sheriff of Northamptonshire from 1261 to 1266.

== Background ==
The surname "la Zouche" may have derived from souch or zuche in Norman French, indicating someone of stocky build.

Zouche was the son of Roger de la Zouche and Margaret and the grandson of Alan la Zouche, who arrived in England around 1172. Alan, the first of the family to come to England, was a younger son of Geoffrey, viscount of Porhoet in Brittany.

== Early service ==
On 15 June 1242 Zouche was summoned to attend the king, Henry III, with horses and arms in Gascony. He was at La Sauve in October, at Bordeaux in March and April 1243, and at La Réole in November. In 1250 Zouche was appointed justice of Chester and of the four cantreds in North Wales. Matthew Paris says that he got this office by outbidding his predecessor, John de Grey. He offered to pay twelve hundred marks for the post instead of five hundred. La Zouche boasted that Wales was nearly all reduced to obedience to the English laws,, but his high-handed acts provoked royal interference and censure. He continued in office as Prince Edward's deputy.

== In Ireland ==
Ireland had been among the lands that Edward had received from Henry III in 1254. In the spring of 1256, Zouche was sent there in service to Prince Edward, and soon afterward, he was appointed justiciar of Ireland under Edward, a post he held until October 1258. In April 1258, he was ordered to repay 60 shillings, which he had borrowed from Edward to supply food for 300 members of Edward's household while they were in Ulster. On 28 June 1258, he received a mandate from the king, now under the control of the barons, not to admit any justice or other officer appointed by Edward to Ireland unless the appointment had the consent of the king and the barons.

== Loyalist ==
During the barons' wars Zouche adhered to the king. He was appointed Sheriff of Northamptonshire in 1261, remaining sheriff until 1264, and sometimes ignored the provisions of Magna Carta by acting as justice itinerant in his shire and also in Buckinghamshire and Hampshire. In 1261, he was also made justice of the forests south of Trent, and in 1263 king's seneschal. In April 1262, he held forest pleas at Worcester. He was constable of Rockingham Castle in the years 1261 to 1264, and of Northampton Castle in the years 1261 to 1263.

On 12 December 1263, Zouche was one of the royalist barons who agreed to submit all points of dispute to the arbitration of Louis IX. He was taken prisoner in the Battle of Lewes. He escaped almost immediately and took refuge in Lewes Priory, where he is said to have been found after the fight disguised as a monk.

In the summer of 1266, Zouche was one of the committee of twelve arbitrators appointed to arrange the terms of the surrender of Kenilworth Castle. On 23 June 1267, after the peace between Henry III and Gilbert de Clare, 8th Earl of Gloucester, he was appointed warden of London and constable of the Tower from June 1257 to April 1268.

In 1270, Zouche and John de Warenne became involved in a dispute over two manors in Northamptonshire. On 19 June the trial was proceeding before the justices at Westminster Hall, and la Zouche seemed likely to win the case. Warenne, on 1 July 1270 at Westminster Hall, attacked both Zouche and his son. Zouche died of his wounds on 10 August 1270, while Warenne was fined heavily for the assault.

== Family and legacy ==
Zouche was a benefactor of the Knights Templars and to Buildwas Abbey, giving lands to both.

Zouche married Helen de Quincy, one of the daughters and coheirs of Roger de Quincy, earl of Winchester and in 1267 succeeded to her share of the Quincy estates. His heir was his son Roger la Zouche. Besides Roger, Zouche and his wife had four other sons: William, Alan, Oliver, and Henry.
