= Caldicott Report =

The Caldicott Committee's Report on the Review of Patient-Identifiable Information, usually referred to as the Caldicott Report, was a review commissioned in 1997 by the Chief Medical Officer of England due to increasing worries concerning the use of patient information in the National Health Service (NHS) in England and Wales and the need to avoid the undermining of confidentiality because of the development of information technology in the NHS, and its ability to propagate information concerning patients in a rapid and extensive way.

A committee was established under the chairmanship of Dame Fiona Caldicott, Principal of Somerville College, Oxford, and previously President of the Royal College of Psychiatrists. Its findings were published in December 1997.

The Caldicott Report highlighted six key principles, and made 16 specific recommendations.

In 2012, Dame Fiona produced a follow-up report which made 26 further recommendations including the addition of a seventh principle which is included in the list below.

In 2016 a further follow-up report was produced following controversy over the care.data initiative from HSCIC.

== Caldicott principles ==
1. Justify the purpose(s)
  Every single proposed use or transfer of patient identifiable information within or from an organisation should be clearly defined and scrutinised, with continuing uses regularly reviewed, by an appropriate guardian.
2. Don't use patient identifiable information unless it is necessary
  Patient identifiable information items should not be included unless it is essential for the specified purpose(s) of that flow. The need for patients to be identified should be considered at each stage of satisfying the purpose(s).
3. Use the minimum necessary patient-identifiable information
  Where use of patient identifiable information is considered to be essential, the inclusion of each individual item of information should be considered and justified so that the minimum amount of identifiable information is transferred or accessible as is necessary for a given function to be carried out.
4. Access to patient identifiable information should be on a strict need-to-know basis
  Only those individuals who need access to patient identifiable information should have access to it, and they should only have access to the information items that they need to see. This may mean introducing access controls or splitting information flows where one information flow is used for several purposes.
5. Everyone with access to patient identifiable information should be aware of their responsibilities
  Action should be taken to ensure that those handling patient identifiable information - both clinical and non-clinical staff - are made fully aware of their responsibilities and obligations to respect patient confidentiality.
6. Understand and comply with the law
  Every use of patient identifiable information must be lawful. Someone in each organisation handling patient information should be responsible for ensuring that the organisation complies with legal requirements.
7. The duty to share information can be as important as the duty to protect patient confidentiality
  Professionals should in the patient's interest share information within this framework. Official policies should support them doing so.

These principles have been subsumed into the NHS confidentiality code of practice.

== Summary of recommendations in original report ==
1. Every dataflow, current or proposed, should be tested against basic principles of good practice. Continuing flows should be re-tested regularly.
2. A programme of work should be established to reinforce awareness of confidentiality and information security requirements amongst all staff within the NHS.
3. A senior person, preferably a health professional, should be nominated in each health organisation to act as a guardian, responsible for safeguarding the confidentiality of patient information.
4. Clear guidance should be provided for those individuals/bodies responsible for approving uses of patient-identifiable information.
5. Protocols should be developed to protect the exchange of patient-identifiable information between NHS and non-NHS bodies.
6. The identity of those responsible for monitoring the sharing and transfer of information within agreed local protocols should be clearly communicated.
7. An accreditation system which recognises those organisations following good practice with respect to confidentiality should be considered.
8. The NHS number should replace other identifiers wherever practicable, taking account of the consequences of errors and particular requirements for other specific identifiers.
9. Strict protocols should define who is authorised to gain access to patient identity where the NHS number or other coded identifier is used.
10. Where particularly sensitive information is transferred, privacy enhancing technologies (e.g. encrypting identifiers or "patient identifying information") must be explored.
11. Those involved in developing health information systems should ensure that best practice principles are incorporated during the design stage.
12. Where practicable, the internal structure and administration of databases holding patient-identifiable information should reflect the principles developed in this report.
13. The NHS number should replace the patient's name on Items of Service Claims made by General Practitioners as soon as practically possible.
14. The design of new systems for the transfer of prescription data should incorporate the principles developed in this report.
15. Future negotiations on pay and conditions for General Practitioners should, where possible, avoid systems of payment which require patient identifying details to be transmitted.
16. Consideration should be given to procedures for General Practice claims and payments which do not require patient-identifying information to be transferred, which can then be piloted.

== See also ==
- Caldicott guardian
- UK Caldicott Guardian Council (UKCGC)
