= 2004 New Year Honours =

British royal recognitions

The New Year Honours 2004 were appointments by some of the Commonwealth realms to various orders and honours to recognise and reward good works by citizens of those countries. The New Year Honours are awarded as part of the New Year celebrations at the start of January.

The New Year Honours were announced on 31 December 2003 in the United Kingdom, New Zealand, Barbados, Bahamas, Grenada, Papua New Guinea, Solomon Islands, Tuvalu, Saint Vincent and the Grenadines, Belize, and Saint Christopher and Nevis,

The recipients of honours are displayed as they were styled before their new honours and arranged by the country (in order of precedence) whose ministers advised The Queen on the appointments, then by honour with grades i.e. Knight/Dame Grand Cross, Knight/Dame Commander etc. and then divisions i.e. Military and Civil, as appropriate.

== United Kingdom ==
=== Knight Bachelor ===
- Richard Armstrong, CBE. Music Director, Scottish Opera. For services to Music.
- Gavyn Arthur, lately Lord Mayor of London. For services to the City of London.
- Stuart Bell, MP, Member of Parliament for Middlesbrough. For services to Parliament.
- Professor Robert David Hugh Boyd, lately Pro-Vice-Chancellor, University of London and former Principal, St George's Hospital Medical School. For services to Medicine.
- Professor John Michael Brady, FRS, BP Professor of Information Engineering, University of Oxford. For services to Engineering.
- Professor Alasdair Muir Breckenridge, CBE, Chairman, Committee on Safety of Medicines. For services to Medicine.
- John Valentine Butterfill, MP, Member of Parliament for Bournemouth West. For services to Parliament.
- The Right Honourable Walter Menzies Campbell, CBE, QC, MP, Member of Parliament for North East Fife. For services to Parliament.
- John Arnold Clark, Chairman and Chief Executive, The Arnold Clark Organisation. For services to the Automotive Industry and to the community in Scotland.
- David Cecil Clementi. For services to the Finance Industry.
- Michael John Darrington, Group Managing Director, Greggs plc. For services to Business and to the community in the North-East.
- Professor John Edwin Enderby, CBE, FRS, Senior Research Fellow and Emeritus Professor, University of Bristol. For services to Science and Technology.
- Professor Martin John Evans, FRS, Professor of Mammalian Genetics and director, Cardiff School of Biosciences, University of Cardiff. For services to Medical Science.
- Peter Oliver Gershon, CBE, Chief Executive, Office of Government Commerce.
- David Edwin Hatch, CBE, JP, Chairman, Parole Board for England and Wales. For services to the Criminal Justice System.
- Professor Bob Alexander Hepple, QC, lately Master, Clare College, University of Cambridge. For services to Legal Studies.
- Derek Alan Higgs. For services to Corporate Governance and Finance.
- Dexter Walter Hutt, Head, Ninestiles Secondary School, Birmingham. For services to Education.
- Simon Jenkins, Journalist. For services to Journalism.
- Bernard O'Connell, Principal and Chief Executive, Runshaw College, South Ribble, Lancashire. For services to Further Education.
- Gerrard Jude Robinson, Chairman, Arts Council England. For services to the Arts.
- Dr John Michael Taylor, OBE, FRS, Director General of Research Councils. For services to Scientific Research.
- Clive Ronald Woodward, OBE. For services to Rugby Union.

Diplomatic Service and Overseas List

- Harold Matthew Evans. For services to Journalism.
- Patrick Michael Leigh Fermor, DSO, OBE. For services to Literature and UK-Greek Relations.

=== Order of the Bath ===
==== Knight Grand Cross of the Order of the Bath (GCB) ====
Military Division

- Admiral Sir Alan West, KCB, DSC, ADC

==== Dame Commander of the Order of the Bath (DCB) ====
Civil Division

- Mavis McDonald, CB, Permanent Secretary, Office of the Deputy Prime Minister
- Juliet Wheldon, CB, QC, H.M. Procurator General, Treasury Solicitor and Head of Government Legal Service

==== Knight Commander of the Order of the Bath (KCB) ====
Military Division

- Vice Admiral Mark Stanhope, OBE
- Lieutenant General John Kiszely, MC, late Scots Guards

==== Companion of the Order of the Bath (CB) ====
Military Division

- Rear Admiral John Lippiett, MBE
- Rear Admiral David George Snelson
- The Venerable John Blackburn, QHC, late Royal Army Chaplains' Department
- Major General Peter Gilchrist, late Royal Tank Regiment
- The Venerable Air Vice Marshal Ronald David Hesketh, QHC
- Air Vice Marshal Barry Thornton

Civil Division

- Harold Vivian Bigley Brown, Chief Executive, Export Credits Guarantee Department.
- Adrian Foss Ellis, Director of Field Operations, Health and Safety Executive.
- Jane Elisabeth Henderson, Regional Director, Government Office for the South West.
- John Garvin Hunter, for Public Service.
- Graham Harold Ben Jordan, Science and Technology Director, Ministry of Defence.
- Sophia Jane Lambert, director, Wildlife, Countryside and Flood Management, Department of Environment, Food and Rural Affairs.
- Peter Rene Lauener, director, Learning Delivery and Standards Group, Department for Education and Skills.
- Robin Rupert Martin, director, Tax Law Re-Write Project, Inland Revenue.
- Colin John Mowl, director, Macroeconomics and Labour Market, Office for National Statistics.
- John Winston Roddick, QC, Counsel General, National Assembly for Wales
- James Scudamore, chief veterinary officer and Director General for Animal Health and Welfare, Department for Environment, Food and Rural Affairs.
- Edward John Weeple, Head, Lifelong Learning Group, Scottish Executive.

Diplomatic Service and Overseas List

- Michael Leo Haygarth Doyle, Director for Policy and Resources, GCHQ

=== Order of Saint Michael and Saint George ===
==== Knight Grand Cross of the Order of St Michael and St George (GCMG) ====
- George Islay MacNeill, The Right Honourable Baron Lord Robertson of Port Ellen, PC, lately Secretary General, NATO.

==== Knight Commander of the Order of St Michael and St George (KCMG) ====
Civil Division

- Michael Anthony Arthur, CMG, High Commissioner, New Delhi.
- David Alexander Ogilvy Edward, CMG, QC, lately Judge of the Court of Justice of the European Communities.
- John Adrian Fortescue, LVO, Director-General for Justice and Home Affairs, European Commission.
- Michael Charles Wood, CMG, Legal Adviser, Foreign and Commonwealth Office.

==== Companion of the Order of St Michael and St George (CMG) ====
Military Division

- Brigadier Stephen Frederick Sherry, OBE, late Corps of Royal Engineers

Civil Division

- Julian Filochowski, OBE – Director, Catholic Agency for Overseas Development.
- Professor John Rex Beddington, FRS. For services to fisheries science and management, especially in the South Atlantic.
- Roger John Cashmore. For services to international co-operation in particle physics.
- Edward Graham Mellish Chaplin, OBE, Director Middle East and North Africa, Foreign and Commonwealth Office.
- Alastair Warren Crooke. For services to the advancement of the Middle East Peace Process.
- Christopher Nigel Donnelly, lately Special Adviser on Central and East European Affairs to the NATO Secretary-General.
- Marvie Elton Georges, OBE, Deputy Governor, British Virgin Islands.
- Monica Celia Harper, H.M. Consul-General, Lille.
- Peter Johnstone, Governor, Anguilla.
- Iain Arthur Gray Mathewson. Counsellor, Foreign and Commonwealth Office.
- Simon Gerard McDonald, H.M. Ambassador, Tel Aviv.
- Ronald Peter Nash, LVO, H.M. Ambassador, Kabul.
- Terence Vasey, Chief Executive, LEPRA, and lately President, International Federation of Anti-Leprosy Associations.

=== Royal Victorian Order ===
==== Knight Commander of the Royal Victorian Order (KCVO) ====
- Sir Frederick Donald Gosling. For services to The Duke of Edinburgh's Award and the Outward Bound Trust.

==== Commander of the Royal Victorian Order (CVO) ====
- (David) Hubert Boothby Chesshyre, L.V.O., formerly Secretary of the Order of the Garter.
- Rowena, Mrs Feilden, L.V.O, Lady in Waiting to The Princess Royal.
- Michael James Kingshott, Trustee, The Duke of Edinburgh's Award (UK).
- The Honourable Priscilla Jane Stephanie, Lady Roberts, L.V.O., Librarian and Curator of the Print Room, Royal Collection, Windsor Castle.
- Caroline Mary, Lady Ryder, M.B.E., formerly Trustee, The Duke of Edinburgh's Award (UK).

Honorary

- Michael Glover, formerly Trustee, The Duke Edinburgh's International Award Association.

==== Lieutenant of the Royal Victorian Order (LVO) ====
- Sir William Martin Castell, formerly Chairman, The Prince's Trust.
- Euan Werran McDonald Curnow, Veterinary Surgeon to the Royal Studs.
- Dr Thomas Robert Evans, Honorary Physician (Civilian) to The Queen.
- Robert David Kime. For Interior design services to The Prince of Wales.
- Miss Hilary Jane Neale (Mrs Lumley), Information Officer, Government News Network (London).
- John Scott, Organist and Director of Music, St Paul's Cathedral.

Honorary

- Jetmund Engeset, formerly Surgeon to the Royal Household in Scotland.

==== Member of the Royal Victorian Order (MVO) ====
- Robert Andrew Ball, Clockmaker, Royal Collection.
- Keith Roy Banham, Farm Manager, Sandringham Estate.
- Miss Julia Ann Crowhurst, Secretary to the Superintendent, Windsor Castle.
- Sarah Louise, Mrs Darling, Rural Campaign Manager, Business in the Community.
- George William Arthur Freston, Secretary, Council of Photographic News Agencies.
- Andrew Hamilton, Consultant to the Duchy of Cornwall.
- Colleen Lorraine, Mrs Harris, formerly Press Secretary to The Prince of Wales.
- Pamela Ann, Mrs Hopes, Secretary to the Dean of Windsor.
- Tom George Stewart McCaw, Land Steward, Eastern District, Duchy of Cornwall.
- Andrew Davison Moir, O.B.E., Visitor Manager, Windsor Castle.
- Lori Anne, Mrs Morris, Senior Aide, Office of the Governor-General, Government House, Canberra.
- Cecil John Nelson, R.V.M., Senior Coachman, Royal Mews.
- Sergeant Colin Trevor Vaughan Paine, Metropolitan Police. For services to Royalty Protection.
- Sergeant Peter Wadman, Metropolitan Police. For services to Royalty Protection.
- Erik George West, Heraldic Artist to the Royal Mews.
- John Graham Woodrow, Finance Director, Ascot Authority.

=== Royal Victorian Medal ===
==== Bar to the Royal Victorian Medal (Silver) ====
- Nancy, Mrs Fenwick, R.V.M. For services to The Queen.
- Michael Norris, R.V.M., Groom, Polhampton Stud.

==== Royal Victorian Medal (Silver) ====
- David John Peter Baldwin, Serjeant of the Vestry, Chapel Royal, St James's Palace.
- Andrew Chambers, Head Warden, Crown Estate, Windsor.
- Gary James Coutts, Stalker, Balmoral Estate.
- Messenger Sergeant Major William Anthony Davis, M.B.E., The Queen's Body Guard of the Yeomen of the Guard.
- Charles Christopher Harding, Woodman, Crown Estate, Windsor.
- Andrew Hawkes, First Chauffeur, Royal Mews.
- Andrew Joseph Hitchman, Valet to The Duke of York.
- Frank Ronald Jones, Fire Surveillance Officer, Windsor Castle.
- Robert Jones, Gardener, Crown Estate, Windsor.
- Constable Norman Angus Gow Maclean, Metropolitan Police. For services to Royalty Protection.
- John Mould, Gardener, Hampton Court Palace.
- David Richard Palfrey, Kitchen Porter, Royal Household.
- John Alexander Perkins, Supervisor, Jewel House, H.M. Tower of London.
- Myrtle Mae, Mrs Simpson, Upholsteress, Royal Household.
- Cecil Raymond Smith, Country Park Worker, Sandringham Estate.
- Miss Elizabeth Maud Wilkinson, Groom, Royal Studs, Hampton Court.

=== Order of the British Empire ===
==== Knight Grand Cross of the Order of the British Empire (GBE) ====
Civil Division

- Sir Cyril Julian Hebden Taylor. For services to Education.

==== Dame Commander of the Order of the British Empire (DBE) ====
Civil Division

- Alexandra Vivien, Mrs Burslem, O.B.E., J.P., Vice-Chancellor, Manchester Metropolitan University. For services to Higher Education.
- Professor Sandra June Noble Dawson, director, Judge Institute of Management Studies, University of Cambridge; Master, Sidney Sussex College. For services to Higher Education and Management Research.
- Joan Irene, Mrs Harbison, C.B.E., Chief Commissioner, Equality Commission for Northern Ireland. For services to Equal Opportunities.
- Pauline, Lady Harris. For charitable services, especially in Education and Health.
- Ms Patricia Anne Hodgson, C.B.E., lately Chief Executive, Independent Television Commission. For services to Broadcasting.
- Elisabeth Anne, Mrs Hoodless, C.B.E., Chief Executive, Community Service Volunteers. For services to Volunteering.
- Rabbi Julia Babette Sarah Neuberger, Chief Executive, King's Fund. For services to the NHS and other Public Bodies.
- Ms Joan Ann Plowright, C.B.E., Actress. For services to Drama.
- Ms Jane Elisabeth Roberts, leader, Camden Council. For services to Local Government.
- Gail, Mrs Ronson. For charitable services, especially to Jewish care and the Royal Opera House.

==== Knight Commander of the Order of the British Empire (KBE) ====
Civil Division

Diplomatic and Overseas List

- His Highness Prince Karim, Aga Khan IV. For services to international development, especially in Asia and Africa, and to UK-French relations.
- Timothy John Berners-Lee, O.B.E. For services to the global development of the Internet.

==== Commander of the Order of the British Empire (CBE) ====
Military Division

- Commodore Andrew James Gildard Miller, Royal Navy.
- Captain Patrick John Walker, Royal Navy.
- Colonel Peter Davies, late Royal Regiment of Wales.
- Colonel Thomas Michael Fitzalan Howard, O.B.E. late Scots Guards.
- Brigadier Christopher Glyn Sheridan Hughes, O.B.E. late The Staffordshire Regiment.
- Major General James Michael Shaw, M.B.E., late Royal Corps of Signals.
- Colonel Stephen Owen Thomas, late Royal Regiment of Artillery.
- Brigadier Donald Ruthven Wilson, late Black Watch.
- Group Captain Mark Colin Green, Royal Air Force.
- Air Commodore Richard Howard Lacey, Royal Air Force.
- Air Commodore Brian Thomas Morgans, Royal Air Force.

Civil Division

- Roy Ackerman, O.B.E., Restaurant and Hotel Consultant. For services to the Culinary Arts.
- Dr Richard Wynne Adams. For public service.
- Christopher John Allsopp, lately Member of the Monetary Policy Committee. For services to Economic Policy.
- Rear Admiral John Herbert Arthur James Louis Armstrong, Chief Executive, Royal Institution of Chartered Surveyors. For services to the Property Profession.
- Dr Maureen Baker, Honorary Secretary, Royal College of General Practitioners and Director of Primary Care, National Patient Safety Agency. For services to Medicine.
- Professor Stephen Bann, Professor of the History of Art, University of Bristol. For services to the History of Art.
- David Behan, lately Director of Social Services, Greenwich Council. For services to Social Care.
- Dr Ian Charles Bostridge, Opera Singer. For services to Music.
- David William Bowerman, J.P., D.L. For services to the community in West Sussex.
- James Thomson Brown, lately chairman, Newsquest Media Group. For services to the Regional Newspaper Industry.
- Donald Hood Brydon, O.B.E., Chairman, Axa Investment Managers and lately chairman, Financial Services Practitioner Panel. For services to the Financial Sector.
- Richard Bull, Q.F.S.M., chief fire officer, Tyne and Wear Fire and Rescue Service. For services to the Fire Service.
- Professor Keith Burnett, F.R.S., Chairman of Physics, University of Oxford. For services to Physics.
- Ms Frances Anne Cairncross, Chair, Economic and Social Research Council. For services to Social Sciences.
- Archibald Alexander Cameron, Director of Operations, Finance and Administration Department, House of Commons.
- Jennifer Ann, Mrs Chart, Headteacher, Portland School, Sunderland. For services to Special Needs Education.
- Eric Patrick Clapton, O.B.E., Musician. For services to Music.
- John Thomas Arthur Clark, lately Headteacher, George Spencer Foundation School and Technology College, Nottingham.
- Professor Jon Clark, Chair, Police Negotiating Board and Police Advisory Board for England and Wales. For services to the Police.
- Professor John Collinge, Professor of Neurology, University College, London. For services to Medical Research.
- Ms Rosemary Jean Neil Conley, D.L. For services to the Fitness and Diet Industries.
- Peter Denis Connolly, O.B.E., Chairman, Warrenpoint Harbour Authority. For services to the Economy in Northern Ireland.
- Professor Raymond Cowell, D.L., lately Vice-Chancellor, Nottingham Trent University. For services to Higher Education.
- Dr Robert McKay Crawford, Chief Executive, Scottish Enterprise. For services to Economic Development.
- Stephen David Daldry, Film and Theatre Director. For services to Drama.
- Dr Lindsey Margaret Davies, Regional Director of Public Health, East Midlands, Department of Health.
- Ray Davies, Singer and Composer. For services to Music.
- Bruce Alan Ian Dingwall, Chief Executive, Venture Production plc. For services to the Oil and Gas Industry in the UK.
- Dr Elaine Margaret Drage, J.P., director, Trade and Development, Department of Trade and Industry.
- The Very Reverend John Dunlop, Minister, Rosemary Presbyterian Church, Belfast. For services to the community in Northern Ireland.
- Anthony Gordon Dunnett, Chief Executive, South-East England Development Agency. For services to Economic Development.
- William Edgar, Director of Engineering, John Wood Group. For services to Industry in Scotland.
- Professor Gwilym Barrie Edwards, Head, Department of Veterinary Clinical Science, University of Liverpool. For services to Veterinary Science.
- Malcolm Trevor Evans, Deputy Director, Business Tax, Inland Revenue.
- David Leonard Felwick, Deputy chairman, John Lewis Partnership. For services to Retailing.
- The Very Reverend Graham Forbes, Provost, St Mary's Cathedral, Edinburgh. For services to Public Life in Scotland.
- Michael James Frater, Chief Executive, Borough of Telford and Wrekin. For services to Local Government.
- Janet Marion, Mrs Gaymer, Chair, Employment Tribunal System Task Force. For services to Employment Law.
- David William Gibson, lately Chief Executive, Association of Colleges. For services to Education.
- Sheila, Mrs Gleig, Chair, British Coal Superannuation Scheme and Trustee of the Mineworkers Pension Scheme. For services to the Coal Industry.
- Professor Keith Gull, Wellcome Trust Principal Research Fellow, University of Oxford. For services to Microbiology.
- Stephen Graham Halliday, Banking and Financial Services Director, Post Office Ltd. For services to Banking.
- Brian Edward Hibbert, managing director, INSYS Ltd. For services to the Defence Industry.
- Dr Andrew Anthony Holt, Head, Information Services Group, Department of Health.
- Stephen Geoffrey Houghton, Leader, Barnsley Metropolitan Borough Council. For services to Local Government.
- Hugh Winston Howe, Headteacher, Fir Vale School, Sheffield. For services to Education.
- Richard John Hunt, President and Past Chairman, Institute of Logistics and Transport. For services to the Logistics and Transport Industries.
- Christopher Trelawney Jago, managing director, NR (CTRL) Ltd. For services to the Channel Tunnel Rail Link.
- Martin Osborne Johnson, O.B.E. For services to Rugby Union.
- David Herbert Jordan, Chairman and managing director, Philips Electronics. For services to the UK Electronics Industry.
- William Jordon, Headteacher, Dyke House School, Hartlepool. For services to Education.
- Dr Christopher John Kitching, Secretary, Historical Manuscripts Commission. For services to Manuscript Heritage.
- Professor Andrew Ross Lorimer, lately President, Royal College of Physicians and Surgeons, Glasgow. For services to Medicine.
- David Lindsay MacKie, Q.C. For services to Pro Bono Legal Work.
- Dr James Loy MacMillan, Composer and Conductor, BBC Philharmonic Orchestra. For services to Music.
- Dr John Walton Marshall, D.L., Regional Commissioner, NHS Appointments Commission. For services to the NHS.
- Nicholas Charles Niels Matheson, Chief Executive, Government Car and Despatch Agency.
- John Edward McConnell. For public service.
- Arthur David McCourt, Chief Executive, Highland Council. For services to Local Government.
- Elizabeth Adele, Mrs McEvilly, Clinical Nurse, Paediatric Diabetes. For services to Children with Diabetes.
- Professor Richard Edward Milburn, lately Professor of Community Education, University of Strathclyde. For services to Community Education and Young People.
- Isabella Krystyna, Mrs Moore, President, British Chambers of Commerce. For services to Commerce.
- Geoffrey Muirhead, Chief Executive, Manchester Airports Group. For services to Aviation.
- Stephen Christopher Murphy, Chief Officer, Northumbria Area. For services to the National Probation Service.
- David Nicholson. For services to the NHS.
- Ms Alison Nimmo, lately Chief Executive, Sheffield One. For services to Urban Regeneration.
- Jeffrey Ord, Q.F.S.M., Firemaster, Strathclyde Fire Brigade. For services to the Fire Service.
- Martin Peach. For public service.
- Charles John Perrin. For charitable services, especially to Health and Education in London.
- Alan Michael Pickering, Chairman, European Federation for Retirement Provision. For services to Occupational Pensions.
- Antony George Pike, Chairman, Home-Grown Cereals Authority. For services to the Arable Crops Industry.
- John Andrew Pinder. For services to e-Government, Cabinet Office.
- Philip Pullman, Writer. For services to Literature.
- Alan William Ramage, lately Keeper and Chief Executive of the Registers of Scotland.
- David Edward John Ramsden, Team Leader, Economic and Monetary Union Policy, H.M. Treasury.
- Nigel Frederick Reader, Director of Finance, Environment Agency. For services to the Environment.
- Dr Malcolm Christopher Reed, Director General, Strathclyde Passenger Transport Executive. For services to the Transport Industry.
- Professor Philip Howell Rees. For services to Human Geography.
- Simon George Michael Relph, Independent Film Producer and lately Chair, BAFTA. For services to the British Film Industry.
- Bernard Francisco Ribeiro, Consultant General Surgeon, Basildon and Thurrock University Hospitals NHS Trust. For services to Medicine.
- Anthony de Villeneuve Russell-Roberts, Administrative Director, Royal Ballet. For services to Dance.
- David Roberts, director, Border Control, H.M Immigration Service, Home Office.
- Dr Christopher John Robinson, C.V.O., Organist, Director of Music and Fellow, St John's College, Cambridge. For services to Music.
- Joan Elizabeth, Mrs Ruddock, O.B.E., Chair, Belfast City Hospital Health and Social Services Trust. For services to Healthcare and to the Community.
- Anthony John Sadler, Archbishops' Secretary for Appointments. For services to the Church of England.
- Ms Theresa Ione Sanderson, O.B.E., Vice-Chairman, Sport England. For services to Sport.
- Ronald William Fordham Searle, Artist and Cartoonist. For services to Art.
- Lynne, Mrs Sedgmore, Principal and Chief Executive, Guildford College. For services to Higher Education.
- John Russell Sell, Chairman, Joint Committee of National Amenity Services. For services to Heritage.
- Eileen, Mrs Sills, Director of Nursing and Quality, Whipps Cross Hospital NHS Trust. For services to the NHS.
- Godric William Naylor Smith, Prime Minister's Official Spokesman.
- Professor Robert Leon Souhami, Medical Oncologist and Researcher. For services to Medicine.
- John Stanley Stevens, Head, Europe Division, Department for Transport.
- Jane, Mrs Stichbury, Q.P.M., Chief Constable, Dorset Police. For services to the Police.
- Anthony David Stoller, lately Chief Executive, Radio Authority. For services to Broadcasting.
- Dr Samuel Thorburn, O.B.E., Chairman, Building Standards Advisory Committee. For services to Construction and Engineering.
- Barry Stephen Townsley. For charitable services, especially to Education and to the Arts.
- Shirley Jean, Mrs Trundle, O.B.E., Universal Banking Director, Department for Work and Pensions.
- Dr Martin John Leslie Turner, Principal Research Fellow, University of Leicester. For services to X-Ray Astronomy.
- Ms Annette Vernon, director, Information and Communications Technologies and e-Delivery, Department for Constitutional Affairs.
- Adrian Thomas Verwoert, Headteacher, The Castle School, Thornbury, Bristol. For services to Education.
- Ann, Mrs Wilks, Secretary, Financial Reporting Council.
- Professor Robert (Robin) Hughes Williams, lately Vice-Chancellor, University of Wales. For services to Education and to the community in Swansea.
- Michael John Wilson, Head of Exhibitions and Display, National Gallery. For services to museums.

Diplomatic and Overseas List

- The Honourable Cyril Eugene Cox, J.P., M.P., Deputy Premier and Minister of Finance, Bermuda.
- Professor Arthur Alan Dashwood. For services to European law and to the Convention on the Future of Europe.
- Dr Khalid Hameed, Chairman, Commonwealth Youth Exchange Council.
- Nihal Vijaya Devadas Kaviratne, Chairman, Unilever Indonesia. For services to UK business interests and to sustainable development in Indonesia.
- John Stephen Leggate. For services to the development of digital business processes.
- Dr Terence John Quinn, lately Director, International Bureau of Weights and Measures.
- Dr Malcolm Austin Rogers, Director, Museum of Fine Arts, Boston. For services to the arts in the UK and the USA.
- The Honourable James Montgomery Ryan, M.B.E., J.P., Chief Secretary, Cayman Islands.
- Raymond James Wilson, Executive Vice-President (Procurement), Airbus. For services to the UK aerospace industry.

==== Officer of the Order of the British Empire (OBE) ====
Military Division

Royal Navy

- Captain Robert Graham Avis, R.D.*, Royal Naval Reserve.
- Commander Iain Wallace Greenlees.
- Captain Robert Thomas Love.
- Commander Andrew Michael McKendrick.
- Colonel Andrew Salmon, Royal Marines.
- Major (now Lieutenant Colonel) Conrad Dermot Biltcliffe Thorpe, Royal Marines.
- Surgeon Commodore Peter Frederick Richmond Tolley.

Army

- Lieutenant Colonel Michael Patrick Biegel, The Green Howards, Territorial Army.
- Lieutenant Colonel Patrick Campbell Curry, Corps of Royal Electrical and Mechanical Engineers.
- Acting Colonel Andrew Michael Flint, T.D., City and County of Bristol Army Cadet Force.
- Lieutenant Colonel Neale John Webster Moss, Army Air Corps.
- Acting Lieutenant Colonel Donald Grant Ross, Dollar Academy Combined Cadet Force.
- Colonel Robert Alan Sharp, M.B.E., late Royal Corps of Signals.
- Lieutenant Colonel Paul Martin Smith, The Royal Logistic Corps.
- Lieutenant Colonel Ian Noel Antony Thomas, The Royal Gurkha Rifles.
- Lieutenant Colonel Roderick George Thomas, Royal Corps of Signals.
- Lieutenant Colonel Anthony Wallace Thornburn, M.B.E., The Devonshire and Dorset Regiment.
- Lieutenant Colonel Colin Kinnaird Walker, M.B.E., Corps of Royal Engineers.
- Colonel Mark Evan Waring, late Royal Regiment of Artillery.
- Lieutenant Colonel Philip Richard Williams, Royal Regiment of Artillery.

Royal Air Force

- Wing Commander Malcolm Andrew Brian Brecht.
- Wing Commander Adrian Jonathon Mark Maddox.
- Wing Commander Richard Leslie Miller.
- Wing Commander David Elvyn Pomeroy, Royal Air Force Volunteer Reserve (Training).
- Wing Commander Gordon Russell Scott.
- Wing Commander John Eric Warner.
- Wing Commander Stephen Welburn.

Civil Division

- Gwen, Mrs Acton, Headteacher, The Valley Community School, Bolton. For services to Education.
- Dorcas Olanike, Mrs Akeju, Community Midwife. For services to Healthcare.
- Charles Edmund Allen, B.E.M. For services to Motor Heritage.
- Alexander Anderson, Divisional Managing Director, Bett Homes. For services to the Construction Industry in Scotland.
- Margaret Mary, Mrs Andrews, Headmistress, Victoria College, Belfast. For services to Education.
- Jarvis Joseph Astaire. For services to Young People in London.
- Professor Eileen Baker, lately Principal, Bishop Grosseteste College, Lincoln. For services to Higher Education.
- Clarissa Mary, Mrs Baldwin, Chief Executive, Dogs Trust. For services to the Welfare of Dogs.
- Eileen Margaret, Mrs Bamford. For services to Children in Belarus.
- John Baragwanath, Team Leader, Business Relations and Innovation Team, Government Office for Yorkshire and the Humber.
- Francis Baron, Chief Executive, Rugby Football Union. For services to Rugby.
- Jane Elizabeth, Mrs Barrie, Chair, Dorset and Somerset Strategic Health Authority. For services to the NHS.
- John Arthur William Bateman, Chief Executive, UK Youth and Vice Chair of the National Council for Voluntary Youth Services. For services to Young People.
- Colin Robert Beardwood, Board Member, Environment Agency. For services to the Environment.
- Charles Beare, Chairman, J. & A. Beare Ltd. For services to the Music Industry.
- James Beeston, Director and Chairman, Invigour Ltd. For services to Urban Regeneration in Birmingham.
- Linda Rhiannon, Mrs Bevan. For services to the community in Wales.
- Donald James Biggar, Farmer. For services to the Livestock Industry.
- Michael Timothy Bolsover, Member, London Employers Coalition. For services to the New Deal.
- Dr Colin Michael Boyne, M.B.E., Technical Manager, QinetiQ. For services to the Defence Industry.
- Robert Wesley Brown, BP Engineering Project Manager and Chairman, Scottish Forestry Alliance. For services to Woodlands in Scotland.
- Martin Bruce, Operations Director, Scottish National Blood Transfusion Service. For services to the Blood Transfusion Service.
- Professor Denys Brunsden, Chairman, Dorset Coast Forum. For services to Geoconservation and to Geomorphology.
- John Joseph Burke, D.L. For services to the community in Bristol.
- Professor Robin Alan Butlin, lately Professor of Historical Geography, University of Leeds. For services to Geography.
- Martin John Callaghan, Director, London Underground Ltd. For services to Public Private Partnership.
- Mary Theresa MacLeod, Mrs Campbell, Board Member, Highlands and Islands Enterprise. For services to Economic Development in the Highlands and Islands.
- Professor Michael Patrick Campbell, Director, Sector Skills Development Agency. For services to Economic Development.
- William George Cann, Chairman, Dartmoor National Park Authority. For services to National Parks.
- Helen Margaret, Mrs Carey, D.L. For services to the National Federation of Women's Institutes and to the Environment.
- John Graham Carrington, Conflict and Humanitarian Adviser, Department for International Development.
- Professor Judith Mary Chessells. For services to Leukaemia Research.
- Dr Marjorie McCallum Chibnall, Medieval Historian, Clare Hall, University of Cambridge. For services to History.
- Miss Sarah Child, Chairman, Addaction. For services to Drug and Alcohol Treatment.
- Mohammed Jehangir Choudhry, Chairman, Puretone plc. For services to the Hearing Aid Industry and to Businesses in Kent.
- Richard Anthony Clark, Chief Executive, Prime Focus. For services to Housing in the West Midlands.
- Robert Lawrence Clark, Director, Cumbria Rural Enterprise Agency. For services to the Rural Community.
- Robert Clarke, lately Chair, Advisory Panel, Beacon Councils. For services to Local Government.
- Alan Malcolm Clarkson. For services to Swimming.
- Roger Paul Claydon, Grade B1, Ministry of Defence.
- Malcolm John Clayton, Headteacher, Fred Nicholson School, Dereham, Norfolk. For services to Special Needs Education.
- Catherine Mary, Mrs Cole, lately Principal, Hereward College of Further Education, Coventry. For services to education for disabled people.
- Maureen Ada, Mrs Cole. For services to the Women's Section, Royal British Legion.
- Robert James Coleman, Grade B2, Ministry of Defence.
- Paul Robert Colley, lately Superintendent, Hampshire Constabulary. For services to the Police.
- Ms Joyce Connon, Scottish Secretary, Workers' Educational Association. For services to Adult Education.
- Janet Clouston Bewley (Poppy), Lady Cooksey, D.L. For services to Fencing.
- Diana Elissa, Lady Copisarow. For Public Service.
- Michael James Counsell, Principal Youth Officer for Gloucestershire. For services to Young People.
- Christopher Thomas Crook, Chair, Sussex Probation Board. For services to the National Probation Service.
- Michael John Crosta, lately Crown Prosecutor, Crown Prosecution Service.
- Professor Christopher John Stokes Damerell. For services to Particle Physics Research, Rutherford Appleton Laboratory, Oxfordshire.
- Michael Davey, Leader, Northumberland County Council. For services to Local Government.
- Hywel Gethin Davies, lately Chairman, Llangollen International Musical Eisteddfod. For services to Music and to International Relations.
- John Thomas Ronald Davies, Photographer. For services to Photography.
- Elspeth Freda, Mrs Davis, Divisional Manager, South West Early Years, Office for Standards in Education.
- Paul Bernard Dermody, lately Chief Executive Officer, De Vere Group plc. For services to the Hospitality Industry.
- Professor Charles Walter Desforges, Emeritus Professor of Education, University of Exeter. For services to Education.
- Philip Lloyd Dinham. For services to Youth and Community Justice.
- Raphael Djanogly, J.P. For Charitable Services.
- David Christopher Curtis Duly, Director, Habinteg Housing Association (Ulster) Limited. For services to Housing in Northern Ireland.
- Ron Egginton, Head, UKAEA Corporate Governance and Business Relations Team, Department of Trade and Industry.
- Geoffrey Leonard Essery. For services to Health and Safety in the Chemical Industry.
- Dr Meirion Rhys Evans, Clinical Senior Lecturer, University of Wales College of Medicine. For services to the WHO in China and to the Hong Kong Government during the SARS Outbreak.
- Professor David Philip Farrington, Professor of Psychological Criminology, Institute of Criminology, Cambridge. For services to Criminology.
- Ms Hazel Farrow, Headteacher, Loxford School of Science and Technology, Redbridge, London. For services to Education.
- John David Flack, Vice Chairman, Federation of Independent Mines. For services to Health and Safety in the Mining Industry.
- Raymond Norman Fletcher, Personnel Director, Remploy. For services to disabled people.
- Paul Forbes, Director, Department of Training, Leeds City Council. For services to Training and Employment for Disadvantaged Groups.
- Professor Janet Ford, Pro-Vice Chancellor, York University. For services to Housing.
- Joan, Mrs Ford, Chair, West Middlesbrough Neighbourhood Trust. For services to Social Inclusion.
- Margaret Susan, Mrs Foster, Chief Executive, Pontypridd and Rhondda NHS Trust. For services to the NHS in Wales and to Equal Opportunities.
- Miss Karen Foulds, District Manager, Jobcentre Plus, Department for Work and Pensions.
- Mary Dawn, Mrs Foulkes, Director, Human Resources Customer Operations, Ford Europe. For services to Diversity.
- Maurice Frankel, Director, Campaign for Freedom of Information. For services to Open Government.
- Simon Andrew Fraser, Chairman, North Areas Board, Scottish Natural Heritage. For services to the Environment and to the Highlands and Islands.
- Professor Judith Wordsworth George, Deputy Director, Open University Scotland. For services to Higher Education.
- Richard Henry Gibbon, lately Head of Engineering Collections, National Railway Museum. For services to Museums.
- John Gilliland, Farmer. For services to the Environment.
- Peter John Gilroy, Director, Social Services, Kent. For services to Social Care.
- John Godfrey. For services to Consumer Food Interests.
- Miss Margaret Elizabeth Goose, Chief Executive, The Stroke Association. For services to Healthcare.
- William Grady, Principal, Isle of Wight College. For services to Education.
- Ian Graham, Principal, John Wheatley College, Glasgow. For services to Further Education and to Community Development.
- Evelyn Esther, Mrs Greer, M.B.E., J.P. For services to the 2003 Special Olympic World Games and to Sport.
- Vivien Margaret, Mrs Griffiths, Vice Chair, Reading Agency. For services to Libraries and Lifelong Learning in Birmingham.
- Brian Malcolm Gunn, Crown Prosecutor, Crown Prosecution Service.
- Maurice Stephen Hall, Senior Principal, Department for Work and Pensions.
- Valerie, Mrs Weddell-Hall, Headteacher, Franche Community First School, Kidderminster, Worcestershire. For services to Education.
- Ms Nancy Hallett, Chief Executive, Homerton Hospital, Hackney, London. For services to the NHS.
- Simon Nicholas Hargreaves, Deputy Chief Test Pilot, BAE Systems. For services to Aviation.
- Samuel Harper, Chair, Glasgow Housing Association. For services to Housing.
- Professor Roy Michael Harrison, The Queen Elizabeth II Birmingham Centenary Professor of Environmental Health, University of Birmingham. For services to Environmental Science.
- Eunice, Mrs Heaney, Pensions Policy Adviser, Staffordshire County Council. For services to the Fire Service.
- Roger Alan Heard, Sales and Marketing Director, Transbus Dennis. For services to Transport.
- Tim Henman. For services to Lawn Tennis.
- Professor Mary Henry, Nursing Consultant. For services to Nursing in Scotland.
- Susan, Mrs Hewett, J.P. For services to the Administration of Justice.
- Miss Sue Higginson, lately Head, the Studio, Royal National Theatre. For services to Drama.
- Ronald William Hiles. For Medical Services to the community in Bangladesh.
- Professor William George Hill, F.R.S., F.R.S.E., Emeritus Professor of Animal Genetics, University of Edinburgh. For services to Science and the Livestock Industry.
- Michael Hirst, Chairman, Business Tourism Partnership. For services to the Tourist Industry.
- Patricia, Mrs Hodgson, Assistant Director, Inland Revenue.
- James Douglas Hogg, lately Chief Architect, Cadw, National Assembly for Wales. For services to Historic Architecture in Wales.
- Michael George Holmes. For services to Horticulture.
- Kenneth Home, Chairman and Chief Executive Officer, K Home Engineering Ltd. For services to Business in Tees Valley.
- David Richard Hopkins, Chairman, British Air Transport Association. For services to the Civil Aviation Industry.
- Benjamin Finley Hoppé, Chairman, Rowecord Group. For services to the Steel Construction Industry.
- Miss Jean Horsburgh, Assistant Chief Executive, Connexions. For services to Young People in Tyne and Wear.
- Professor Celia Hoyles, Professor of Mathematics Education, Institute of Education, University of London. For services to Education.
- Roy Hudd, Actor, Comedian and Playwright. For services to Entertainment.
- Dr Owain Arwel Hughes, Conductor. For services to Music and Charity.
- John Humphreys, Acting Director of Employment Relations, Royal College of Nursing. For services to the NHS.
- Colin Howard Johnson, Director, Techniquest. For services to Science.
- Paul Andrew Johnston. For public service.
- Thomas Johnston, lately Chairman, Abbeyfield Northern Ireland Regional Council. For services to the community in Northern Ireland.
- Professor Richard McLaren Johnstone, Director, Scottish Centre for Information on Language Teaching and Research. For services to Modern Languages Education.
- John Grant Jones, Chairman, Association of Justices' Chief Executives. For services to the Magistrates' Courts Service.
- Mark Ralph Cornwall-Jones, lately Chairman, Ecclesiastical Insurance Group. For services to the Church and to the Insurance Industry.
- Wyn Edgerton Jones, Chairman, British Alcan Aluminium plc. For services to the Aluminium Industry.
- Alexander Cameron Keay, Finance Director, Montrose Port Authority. For services to the Ports Industry.
- Dr Maurice Hugh Keen, Emeritus Fellow in Medieval History, Balliol College, University of Oxford. For services to History.
- Dr Ian Allan Philip Keitch, Consultant Forensic Psychiatrist. For services to Mental Health and Public Safety.
- Professor Gordon Kirk, lately Vice-Principal, University of Edinburgh. For services to Teacher Education.
- Miss Stella Kwan, Dental Hygienist. For services to Dentistry.
- Miss Mei Sim Lai. For services to Equal Opportunities.
- Michael James Leahy, General Secretary, Iron and Steel Trades Confederation. For services to Trade Unions.
- Joseph Leiper, Headteacher, Oldmachar Academy, Aberdeen. For services to Education.
- Jason Leonard, M.B.E. For services to Rugby Union.
- Toni Eva, Mrs Letts, Chief Executive, Croydon YMCA Housing Association. For services to Housing and Social Care.
- Michael John Littlewood, Group Manager, East Anglia, Bedfordshire and Hertfordshire Courts, The Court Service, Department for Constitutional Affairs.
- Ms Margaret Jennifer Llewellyn, Managing Director, Swansea Container Terminal plc. For services to Economic Development in Wales.
- Gabrielle Patricia, Mrs Lobley, lately Deputy Director, Basic Skills Agency. For services to Basic Skills Provision.
- Dr John Bruce Loudon, lately Principal Medical Officer. For services to Psychiatric Medicine, Scottish Executive.
- Malcolm Leonard Lyons, Senior Manager, Building, Estates and Services Group, Home Office.
- Alasdair MacConachie, D.L. For services to the community in Darlington, County Durham.
- Donald Whyte MacLeary, lately (currently Guest) Principal Repetiteur, Royal Ballet. For services to Dance.
- Paul Makin. For services to the Safety of Machinery.
- Paul Stacy Marks, National Secretary, UNISON. For services to the NHS.
- James Charles Marshall. For services to the Music Industry and to Charity.
- Kathleen, Mrs Martin, Assistant Chief Driving Examiner, Driving Standards Agency.
- Ms Carol Ann McCormack. For services to the Home Office and H.M. Treasury.
- Alastair James McDowell. For public service.
- Edward Norman McGuigan. For public service.
- Miss Virginia Anne McKenna. For services to the Arts and to Animal Conservation.
- Ian Doig McMillan, Managing Director, McMillan UK Ltd. For services to Business in Tayside.
- Miss June Yvonne Mendoza, A.O., Portrait Painter. For services to the Arts.
- Professor Elizabeth Miller, Head, Immunisation Department, Communicable Disease Surveillance Centre, Health Protection Agency. For services to Public Health Medicine.
- Felix David Mooney, Chief Executive, Mooney Hotel Group. For services to the Tourist and Hospitality Industries in Northern Ireland.
- Pierce Joseph Moore, M.B.E., Private Secretary, Parliamentary Counsel Office.
- Raymond Graham Moore, Principal, Stoke-on-Trent College. For services to Further Education.
- Anton Mosimann, Proprietor and Founder, Mosimann Academy of Culinary Excellence, London. For services to the Tourist and Food Industries.
- Professor John Moverley, Principal and Chief Executive, Myerscough College, Preston. For services to Further Education.
- Irene, Mrs Murdoch, Head, Welfare Services, Inland Revenue.
- Heather Elizabeth, Mrs Murray, Superintendent, South Wales Police. For services to Domestic Violence Issues in the UK and Abroad.
- Norman Newell, Music Producer and Composer. For services to the Music Industry.
- Eric Leslie Newsome. For services to Social Security Adjudication.
- Martin Hugh Michael O'Neill, M.B.E., Manager, Celtic Football Club. For services to Football.
- James William Oatridge, Group Services Director, Severn Trent plc. For services to the UK and Global Water Industries.
- Miss Dora Kwatiorkor Opoku, Head of Department of Midwifery, City University, London. For services to Midwifery.
- James Alexander Orr, Q.P.M., Director, Scottish Drug Enforcement Agency. For services to Strathclyde Police and the Scottish Drug Enforcement Agency.
- Richard John Palmer, J.P., D.L., Vice President, National Council of YMCAs. For services to Young People.
- Nicholas Parsons, Actor and Presenter. For services to Drama and Broadcasting.
- Alan William Pemberton, lately Senior Plant Health Consultant, Central Science Laboratory, Department for Environment, Food and Rural Affairs.
- Commodore Ian Richard Pemberton, R.D., D.L., Royal Naval Reserve (Retired). For services to the Wessex Reserve Forces and Cadets Association.
- Ian Peter Phillips, Partner, Kroll Buchler Phillips. For services to the Insolvency Profession.
- Andrea Joan, Mrs Pierce, Anti-Avoidance Team Leader, Policy Group, H.M. Customs and Excise.
- John Graham Pontin. For charitable services in Bristol.
- Peter William Postlethwaite, Actor. For services to Drama.
- Stephen Peter Powell, Chief Executive, SIGN. For services to Deaf People.
- Professor Monder Ram, Professor of Small Business, De Montfort University, Leicester. For services to Black and Ethnic Minority Businesses.
- Christopher John Richards, lately Accountancy Policy Manager and Secretary, Financial Reporting Advisory Board, H.M. Treasury.
- Professor Sue Richards, Professor of Public Management, University of Birmingham. For services to Public Leadership.
- Martyn Alan Ripley, Chief Superintendent, North West Area, British Transport Police. For services to the Police.
- John Taylor Roberts, lately Senior Economic Adviser, Department for International Development.
- (Richard) Andrew Robinson. For services to Rugby Union.
- Ms Heather Rogers, Senior Civil Servant, Department of Health.
- Gairn Andrew Ross, lately Director of Veterinary Services, People's Dispensary for Sick Animals. For services to Animal Welfare.
- Patricia Marguerite Mary, Mrs Samson, Head, Diversity and Equality, Inland Revenue.
- Elizabeth, Mrs Sargeant, Physiotherapist. For services to the NHS.
- Michael Shann, Governor, H.M. Prison Birmingham, H.M. Prison Service, Home Office.
- Dr Linda Shaw. For services to Paediatric Dentistry.
- Sidney Lawrence Shipton. For services to the Jewish Community and Inter Faith Relations.
- Ranjit Singh. For services to Race and Community Relations.
- Professor James Ferguson Skea, Director, Policy Studies Institute. For services to UK Sustainable Transport.
- William Simon Rodolph Kenyon-Slaney, J.P., D.L. For services to the St John Ambulance Brigade in Shropshire.
- Anne, Mrs Sloman, lately Chief Political Adviser, BBC. For services to Broadcasting.
- Dr Peter Samuel Smith, Chairman, National Association of Primary Care and General Medical Practitioner, Kingston upon Thames, Surrey. For services to Medicine.
- Stuart Brian Smith. For services to Industrial Archaeology.
- Jonquil Frances Loveday, Mrs Solt. For services to Disabled Riding.
- Dr Michel Soukop, Head, Department of Medical Oncology, Royal Infirmary University NHS Trust, Glasgow. For services to Medical Oncology.
- John Walter Spencer, Chairman, Lanemark International. For services to Business and International Trade.
- Dr Margaret Flora Spittle, Consultant Clinical Oncologist, The Middlesex Hospital and St John's Centre for Diseases of the Skin, St Thomas' Hospital. For services to Medicine.
- Professor Margaret Anne Stanley, Professor of Epithelial Biology, University of Cambridge. For services to Virology.
- Michael Edward Taylor Stockbridge, Grade B1, Ministry of Defence.
- Peter Stuttard. For services to Nature Conservation in Wales.
- Brenda, Mrs Swaddle, Headteacher, Eastwood Nursery School, Wandsworth, London. For services to Education.
- Peter Gordon Tallantire, Team Leader, Civil Contingencies Secretariat, Cabinet Office.
- Christopher John Tarrant, Radio and Television Presenter. For services to Broadcasting and Charity.
- John Phillip Teece, Modernising Appeals Programme Director, Department for Work and Pensions.
- Jennifer Margaret, Mrs Thompson, Head of Social Work, South Ayrshire Council. For services to Social Work Education and Training.
- Air Commodore Mark Graham Tomkins, M.B.E., Royal Air Force (Retired). For services to the Royal Air Forces Association.
- Norman Trotter, Senior Consultant, Kennedys Group. For services to Licensing and Intellectual Property Rights.
- Dr Rona Valerie Tutt, lately Headteacher, Woolgrove Special School, Letchworth, and 2003 Vice President, National Association of Head Teachers. For services to Special Needs Education.
- John Charles Twist, Grade B1, Ministry of Defence.
- Councillor Kay Twitchen, Chair, Local Government Waste and Environmental Management Executive. For services to Local Government.
- Geoffrey Tyler, Vice Chair of the corporation, Sussex Downs College. For services to Further Education.
- Jean, Mrs Venables, M.B.E., lately Chairman, Thames Regional Flood Defence Committee. For services to Flood Defence.
- Dale Vince, Managing Director, Ecotricity Limited. For services to the Environment and to the Electricity Industry.
- Dr Sarah Walters, Senior Lecturer in Public Health and Epidemiology, University of Birmingham. For services to Medicine.
- Elizabeth, Mrs Walton, Grade 6, Head, North and West Team, Government Office for London.
- John Stephen Whitehead, Director, Scottish Food Quality Certification Ltd. For services to the Agri-food Industry.
- Roy Whittle, Principal, Bolton Sixth Form College and Chairman, A/AS History Examiners, Assessment and Qualifications Alliance. For services to Education.
- Derek Marshall Wilding, Vice-President, Defence Support Sector, Rolls-Royce. For services to the Aerospace Industry.
- Jonathan Peter Wilkinson, M.B.E. For services to Rugby Union.
- Peter Molyneux, Founder, Lionhead Studios. For services to the Computer Games industry.
- Philip James Wilkinson, Chairman, Dairy Council. For services to the Dairy Industry.
- Shan, Mrs Wilkinson, Leader, Wrexham County Borough Council. For services to Local Government.
- Andrew Nicholas Williams, Managing Director, Underwater Systems, BAE Systems. For services to the Defence Industry.
- Professor Jonquil Fiona Williams, Professor of Social Policy, University of Leeds. For services to Social Policy.
- James Andrew Williamson, Managing Director, Hastoe Housing Association. For services to Rural Housing and Environmental Sustainability.
- Geoffrey Alan Wilson, Chairman, Equity Land Ltd. For services to the Historic Environment.
- Hilda, Mrs Wilson, lately Headteacher, Charles Darwin Primary School, Northwich, Cheshire. For services to Education.
- Ms Penelope Alice Wilton, Actress. For services to Drama.
- Dr Malcolm Leonard Windsor, Secretary, North Atlantic Salmon Conservation Organization. For services to Salmon Conservation.
- Peter David Wiseman. For services to the Publicly Funded Advice Services in the West Midlands.
- Dr Beatrix Wonke, Consultant Haematologist. For services to Medicine.
- Michael John Worthington, Chair, Community Justice National Training Organisation; Acting Chair, Justice Sector Skills Council Shadow Board. For services to the Criminal Justice Sector.
- Philip Andrew Janson Wright, Assistant Serjeant-at-Arms, House of Commons.
- Miss Zofia Anna Zimand, Crown Prosecutor, Crown Prosecution Service.

Diplomatic and Overseas List

- Christopher James Allison. For services to healthcare in developing countries.
- Rajiv Ratnakar Bendre, Director Sierra Leone, British Council.
- Ms Liliana Sztejnbis-Jafar Biglou, Director Ukraine, British Council.
- Dr Carmen Elizabeth Blacker. For services to Japanese studies and UK–Japanese relations.
- Christopher Ledwith Brown, lately Director West and South Europe, British Council.
- Dr Donald Brownlie. For services to healthcare and rural development in Africa.
- Colonel David Muir Burrill. For services to international security management.
- Gordon Cameron. For services to the UK biotechnology industry in the USA.
- Andrew Robert Cornell, First Secretary, Foreign and Commonwealth Office.
- Richard Arthur Cowley, M.B.E. For services to English language teaching in Uruguay and to UK–Uruguayan cultural relations.
- Stanley Arnold Crossick, Director and Founding Chairman of the European Policy Centre.
- Hamish St Clair Daniel, lately H.M. Ambassador, Dili.
- Dr Hany Abdel Gawad El-Banna, President and Founder, Islamic Relief.
- Miss Caroline Margaret Elliot, H.M. Consul-General, Chongqing.
- Professor Malcolm David Evans. For services to the promotion of human rights, especially torture prevention and religious freedom.
- Miss Irene Findlay (Irene Paterson-Hesford), Senior Adviser on social services, Coalition Provisional Authority, Baghdad.
- Martin John Fuggle. For services to financial services regulation, especially in Gibraltar.
- Richard Curtis Fursland. For services to British business interests in the USA.
- Ms Maria Adela Anna Gooch Galvez. For services to UK–Spanish relations.
- Guy Mervin Charles Green. For services to the UK film industry in the USA.
- Professor Andrew Frederic Wallace-Hadrill, Director, British School at Rome. For services to UK-Italian cultural relations.
- Ms Louise Jane Harvey, M.V.O. For services to British business interests in Belgium.
- David John Sinclair Hepburn. For services to UK–Mongolian relations.
- Anne Voase, Mrs Coates Hickox. For services to film editing in the USA.
- Peter Hoggins, lately Head, British International School, Jakarta.
- Gareth Hughes. For services to British business interests in Peru.
- Keith Pellow Jenkins, lately Director, Church and Society Commission of the Conference of European Churches.
- Arek Victor Joseph. For services to the community, Cayman Islands.
- Timothy Kaunov. For services to British business interests in Ukraine.
- Anthony Kennedy, Chief Executive, Co-operation Ireland.
- Ms Katharine Maria Lee, Director, Great Britain–China Centre.
- Rabbi Dr Abraham Levy. For services to inter-faith cooperation.
- The Honourable Stanley William Lowe, J.P., M.P., Speaker, House of Assembly, Bermuda.
- John Bannerman Macpherson, Counsellor, British Embassy Stockholm.
- Dr Zulfikar Masters. For services to international trade.
- Robin Inglis McConnachie. For services to financial services regulation, especially in Hungary.
- Professor Dawud Olatokumbo Shittu Noibi. For services to inter-faith co-operation.
- Ms Ursula Margaret Owen, Editor-in-Chief, Index on Censorship. For services to the promotion of human rights.
- Martin John Kilburn Rickerd, M.V.O., lately Deputy Head of Mission and H.M. Consul, British Embassy Abidjan.
- Peter John Tullis Sanday. For services to architectural heritage conservation and training, especially in Cambodia and Nepal.
- Elizabeth Jean, Mrs Smith, Secretary-General, Commonwealth Broadcasting Association.
- Ronald Thomas Stones, M.B.E., Head, Tanglin Trust School, Singapore.
- Peter John Le Sueur. For services to de-mining, especially in Afghanistan.
- Allan Charles Thornton, President, Environmental Investigation Agency. For services to the protection of wildlife and the environment.
- James John Walker. For services to exports.
- Miss Iris Williams, Singer. For services to music and charitable causes.
- John Anthony Bernard Wotton. For services to UK–Singapore relations in the healthcare sector.

==== Member of the Order of the British Empire (MBE) ====
Military Division

- Warrant Officer (2nd Class) Edward Oliver Anderson, Royal Marines P041461L.
- Major Stephen John Corbidge, Royal Marines.
- Warrant Officer (Abovewater Warfare Tactical) Stephen Henry Delo D182750H.
- Warrant Officer (Writer) David Thomas Eagles D124444Q
- Major Richard Everritt, Royal Marines.
- Lieutenant Commander David Jonathan Sinclair Goddard, Royal Navy.
- Chief Petty Officer (Stores Accountant) Kevin Paul Gould D185587V.
- Commander Victor Robert Gubbins, Royal Navy.
- Lieutenant Commander Peter Denis Harvey, Royal Naval Reserve (Sea Cadet Corps).
- Lieutenant Commander Robin Knights, Royal Navy.
- Acting Chief Petty Officer Marine Engineering Artificer Robert John Love D193076B.
- Warrant Officer (2nd Class) Clifton George Martland, Royal Marines P033549T.
- Commander Jonathan Michael Newell, Royal Navy.
- Lieutenant (now Lieutenant Commander) David Noon, Royal Navy.
- Commander Lindsay Phillip Rooms, Royal Naval Reserve (Sea Cadet Corps).
- Warrant Officer (Aircraft handler) Malcolm John Shaw D152515V.
- Commander Peter Michael Wardley, Royal Navy.
- Captain Keith James Anderson (560519), Small Arms School Corps.
- Major (Queen's Gurkha Officer) Laxmibhakta Bantawa (540658), The Royal Gurkha Rifles.
- Acting Major Frances Theresa Bilton (550962), Shropshire Army Cadet Force.
- Major Andrew Jonathan Paul Bourne (529718), The Royal Gurkha Rifles.
- Major Alistair Duncan Boyle (534782), Corps of Royal Engineers.
- Major Richard Patrick Brent (530999), Corps of Royal Engineers.
- 24772423 Staff Sergeant Darren Patrick Edward Bryce, Corps of Royal Electrical and Mechanical Engineers.
- Acting Major Kenneth Reginald Bustard (528435), Sussex Army Cadet Force.
- 24772873 Sergeant Adrian Mark Collins, Royal Regiment of Artillery.
- Lieutenant Colonel Phillip Ralph Couser (523922), The Royal Logistic Corps.
- 24333411 Warrant Officer Class 2 Roy Herbert Deal, Adjutant General's Corps (Staff and Personnel Support).
- 25045809 Lance Corporal Corin Ashley Donaldson, Royal Corps of Signals
- 24676164 Warrant Officer Class 1 Paul Edward Fletcher, The Royal Logistic Corps.
- Major Ludwig Karl Ford (521380), Royal Regiment of Artillery.
- GR8083 Corporal James Sean Frendo, The Royal Gibraltar Regiment.
- Captain Patricia Lorraine Gibson (551117), Queen Alexandra's Royal Army Nursing Corps.
- Captain Amarjit Singh Gill (540896), Berkshire Army Cadet Force.
- Honorary Major Dillikumar Gurung (521323), The Royal Gurkha Rifles.
- Major Richard John Courteney-Harris (510160), The Queen's Lancashire Regiment.
- 24513721 Warrant OYcer Class 2 Adrian Holcombe, The Devonshire and Dorset Regiment.
- Major Robert Leslie Holt (528425), Royal Corps of Signals, Territorial Army.
- Major Eric Ingram (526092), Corps of Royal Electrical and Mechanical Engineers, Territorial Army.
- 24657645 Warrant Officer Class 1 Harry David Bidribb Irving, Corps of Royal Electrical and Mechanical Engineers.
- Major Anthony Vaughan Jones (542269), The Royal Welsh Regiment, Territorial Army.
- Major Richard Jones (546927), The Royal Logistic Corps.
- 24589787 Warrant Officer Class 1 Lawrence Kerr, Scots Guards.
- Captain Susan Carol Little (546545), The Royal Logistic Corps.
- Major Colin Thomas McClean (529006), Corps of Royal Electrical and Mechanical Engineers.
- Major Gerald Raymond McCourt (535640), The Royal Logistic Corps.
- Major Wayne Bernard Morgan (535205), Army Physical Training Corps.
- 24856869 Staff Sergeant Stuart Christopher Nellist, Adjutant General's Corps (Staff and Personnel Support).
- Major Frank Morgan Philip (506650), The Highlanders.
- 24391693 Warrant Officer Class 2 Martyn Andrew Redfearn, Corps of Royal Engineers.
- Major Kenneth Frank Reece (538044), The Royal Logistic Corps, Territorial Army.
- Acting Lieutenant Colonel Malcolm David Render (506074), Yorkshire (North and West) Army Cadet Force.
- W0436626 Sergeant Christine Ann Rooney, Adjutant General's Corps (Staff and Personnel Support).
- 24347693 Warrant Officer Class 2 Stephen James Savage, The Royal Green Jackets.
- Major Michael David William Schofield (531538), Corps of Royal Engineers.
- Major Mark James Spandler (540759), The Royal Gloucestershire, Berkshire and Wiltshire Regiment.
- 24587331 Warrant Officer Class 1 David Mark Steer, Intelligence Corps.
- 24805511 Staff Sergeant Patrick Nigel Thomas, Adjutant General's Corps (Staff and Personnel Support).
- Acting Major David Melville Thompson (530424), Trinity School Combined Cadet Force.
- W0817408 Sergeant Maureen Ann Tucker, Adjutant General's Corps (Staff and PersonnelSupport).
- Major John Stamford Morton Tulloch (495695), Royal Regiment of Artillery.
- Major Dennis George Vincent (517799), The Royal Anglian Regiment.
- Major Glyn Walker (547566), Royal Army Medical Corps.
- 24756110 Staff Sergeant Mark Ian Watts, Adjutant General's Corps (Military Provost Staff).
- 4149995 Warrant Officer Class 2 Patrick Thomas Weir, Adjutant General's Corps (Military Provost Guard Service)
- 24542701 Staff Sergeant Anthony Stephen Wheeler, Corps of Royal Electrical and Mechanical Engineers.
- Major Keith Jeffrey Willder (538869), Corps of Royal Electrical and Mechanical Engineers.
- Major Andrew Mark Wright (531877), The Parachute Regiment.
- Warrant Officer Andrew Simon Barnes (R8117485), Royal Air Force.
- Master Aircrew Robert Alan Carter(R8121235), Royal Air Force.
- Chief Technician Colin Hugh Percy Chambers (D8015658), Royal Air Force.
- Flight Sergeant Alan David Cragg (A8107477), Royal Air Force.
- Squadron Leader Michael Ernest Eagles (5203828M), Royal Air Force.
- Flight Lieutenant Darren Andrew Goldstraw (5204333C), Royal Air Force.
- Squadron Leader Brian Thomas Fraser Hall, A.E. (2616111E), Royal Air Force Reserve.
- Corporal Keith Alexander Henig (G8290027), Royal Air Force.
- Sergeant Michael Andrew Kelman (C8402840), Royal Air Force.
- Sergeant Mohammed Zaryab Khan (R8284174), Royal Air Force.
- Warrant Officer Robert Bradie Loughlin (T8099530), Royal Air Force.
- Flight Sergeant Peter John Morrice (H8189979), Royal Air Force.
- Warrant Officer David Cartwright Page (Q8091672), Royal Air Force.
- Squadron Leader Andrea Louise Palk (0306152K), Royal Air Force.
- Squadron Leader Thomas Joseph Perrem, A.F.C, (8025313P), Royal Air Force.
- Squadron Leader Gary Philip Sawyer (2628333D), Royal Air Force.
- Wing Commander John Michael Sullivan (8029148C), Royal Air Force.
- Squadron Leader Colin James Wills (8027373J), Royal Air Force.

Civil Division

- Stuart Richard Abbot. For services to Rugby Union.
- Barry Charles Adby, lately Retained Officer, Oxfordshire Fire and Rescue Service. For services to the Fire Service.
- David Alred. For services to Rugby Union.
- Martha Alexander. For services to the Girls' Brigade in Bridge of Don, Aberdeen.
- Irene Elizabeth Allen, Director, Listawood Ltd. For services to Equal Opportunities.
- Jenny Wood Allen. For services to Charity and Distance Running.
- Mark Wayne Alleyne, Cricketer. For services to Cricket.
- Jack Amos. For services to Working Men's Clubs in the North East.
- John Darrell Amos, Area Customer Relations Manager, Inland Revenue.
- John Anderson, Assistant Chief Engineer, Thales. For services to the Defence Industry.
- Dulcie Ann Andrews, lately Driver, Government Car and Despatch Agency.
- Timothy Paul Appleton, Manager, Rutland Water Nature Reserve. For services to Wildlife and Nature Conservation.
- Jack Archer. For services to the community in York.
- Jennifer Lynda Diane Argote, Grade E1, Ministry of Defence.
- Gerard Armstrong, lately Teacher, St. Michael's Roman Catholic Voluntary Aided Comprehensive School, Billingham, Stockton-on-Tees. For services to Education.
- John Llewellyn Arnott. For services to the Young Farmers Movement in South Wales.
- Michael Thomas Arnott. For services to the Royal Mail and to the community in Derby.
- Subathira Arunachalam, lately Compliance Support Officer, Inland Revenue.
- Matthew Ashwood. For services to the families of UK Victims of 11 September 2001. Department for Constitutional Affairs.
- Victor Alan Atkins, Gardener. For services to the Joseph Rowntree Foundation and to the community in New Earswick, North Yorkshire.
- Rita Atkinson. For services to Young People and to the community in Sutton Courtenay, Oxfordshire.
- Gerald Alan George Attwater, Grade C2, Ministry of Defence.
- Neil Back. For services to Rugby Union.
- Sidney Thomas Bailey, J.P. For services to the community in Brampton Bierlow, South Yorkshire.
- Tom Bailey, Head, Building and Maintenance, Royal Botanic Gardens, Kew. For services to the National Building Heritage.
- Margaret Amy Baird. For services to Art Heritage in Lincolnshire.
- Bryan Baker. For services to the Independent Monitoring Board, HM Prison Stafford and the Independent Monitoring Board National Advisory Council.
- Joan Eileen Minnie Baker, J.P. For services to the community in Acton and Ealing, London.
- Andrew Stuart Bales, Unit Leader, The Duke of Edinburgh's Award, Newquay Tretherras School, Cornwall. For services to Young People.
- Iain Robert Balshaw. For services to Rugby Union.
- Carol Ann Bardy, Patient Affairs Officer, York Hospitals NHS Trust. For services to the NHS.
- Betty Barker. For services to OXFAM.
- Vida Kate Barnes. For services to the Royal British Legion, Andover, Hampshire.
- Roy Charles Barnett. For services to UNICEF.
- Una Barry, Deputy Chief Executive, DepaulTrust. For services to Disadvantaged People in London.
- Jill Bartrop. For services to Deaf People and the NHS in North Sheffield.
- Trevor John Frederick Bate, Grade C2, Ministry of Defence.
- Dr. John Frank Beal, J.P. Consultant. For services to Dental Public Health in West Yorkshire.
- Richard Claude Beale, Mace Bearer, London Borough of Sutton. For services to Local Government.
- Dr. Bertram Julian Beecham. For services to the Leonard Cheshire Foundation.
- Alice Bell. For services to the community in Sighthill, Glasgow.
- Helen Margaret Bennett, Member, World Crafts Council. For services to the Arts.
- Diana Betty Benson, House Chairman, Abbeyfield House, Beaminster, Dorset.
- Patricia Kathleen de Gray Birch, Front of House, Alvis plc. For services to the Defence Industry.
- Stanley Eric Bird, Naturalist and Film Cameraman. For services to Nature Conservation in the North.
- Russell Thomas Blackwell, lately Treasurer, Benevolent Fund, Department for Education and Skills.
- Eric Blakeley. For services to Mountaineering, Sport and Charity in Jersey.
- Neville John Blakeley, lately Head of Mathematics and Assistant Headteacher, Fair Oak High School, Rugeley, Staffordshire. For services to Education.
- Alwyn Blockley. For services to the Unemployed in Lancashire.
- Kenneth Blood. For services to Amateur Boxing in Doncaster.
- Richard George William Pitt Booth. For services to Tourism in Powys.
- Marjorie Rose Leigh Boothby, Prison Visitor, H.M. Prison Stafford. For services to the Prison Service.
- Margaret Bozic, Rating Caseworker, Valuation Office Agency.
- Kyran Bracken. For services to Rugby Union.
- Raymond Bradley. For services to Charities.
- Maureen Bramall. For services to the community in Southey Green, Sheffield.
- Michael Lindsay Branson. For services to People with Learning Disabilities and to the community in West Sussex.
- Clare Jane Bridges. For services to the Magistrates' Courts Service.
- Sara Alison Brigg, Deputy Headteacher, Castlefields Infant School, Rastrick, Yorkshire. For services to Education.
- John Maurice Brock, Chair of Governors, Sageston Primary School, Pembrokeshire. For services to Education and to the community in Pembrokeshire.
- John Roy Bromwich, Foster Carer. For services to Foster Care in the West Midlands.
- Marjorie Joan Bromwich, Foster Carer. For services to Foster Care in the West Midlands.
- David Brooks, Breathing Apparatus Technician, Devon Fire and Rescue Service. For services to the Fire Services National Benevolent Fund.
- Carolyn Margaret Brown. For services to the communities in Elsfield and Marston, Oxfordshire.
- Constance Jean Brown. For services to the community in Countesthorpe, Leicester.
- Sheila Brown. For services to Girlguiding in Manchester.
- Victor Brown, lately Site Manager, Abbey Hill School Technology College, Stockton-on-Tees. For services to Education.
- Hilda Brownlow, J.P. For services to the community in Bournemouth.
- Margaret Patricia Bruce. For services to the Medical Profession in Jersey.
- Dr. Derek Derwent Brumhead. For services to Heritage in New Mills, Derbyshire.
- Evan Bryson. For services to Young People, especially the Redheugh Boys Club, Gateshead, Tyne and Wear.
- Terence Bucknall, Environment Protection Officer, Environment Agency. For services to Environment Protection in East Lancashire.
- Alex Burns. For services to the community in Cardenden, Fife.
- Dr. James Michael Crowther Burton, lately Vice Chairman, Yorkshire Dales Society. For services to the Environment.
- Mavis Butler, J.P. For services to Health and to the community in Burnley, Lancashire.
- Phillip William Bye, Senior Cameraman, ITN. For services to Television News.
- Eileen Marion Caddy, Co-Founder, Findhorn Foundation. For services to Spiritual Enquiry.
- Paul Martin Cahill, Inspector, Metropolitan P lice Service and Chairman, Gay Police Association. For services to diversity within the Police and to the wider gay community.
- Ivor Calverley. For services to the Royal Air Force Association in East Sussex.
- Captain William Robert Canning, D.S.O, D.L., Royal Navy (Retired), Voluntary Ranger, Exmoor National Park. For services to Nature Conservation.
- Michael Caplin, Head Glassblower, Chemistry Department, University of Southampton. For services to Glassblowing.
- Linda McLean Capper, Head, Press, Public Relations and Education, British Antarctic Survey. For services to Science.
- Rene Roland Carayol. For services to the Black Business Community.
- Barry Care. For services to the community in Moulton, Northamptonshire.
- Hilson Michael Carter. For services to The Carpenter's Shop and to the community in Walsall, West Midlands.
- Michael John Catt. For services to Rugby Union.
- The Reverend Stephen John Chalke. For services to Social Exclusion through the charities Oasis Trust and Parentalk.
- David Charles Challenger. For services to the Soldiers', Sailors' and Airmen's Families Association in Luton, Bedfordshire.
- William Henry Chalton, Public Examiner for Science and Chemistry. For services to Education.
- Josephine Suet Chan, Language Teacher, Greenwich Chinese School, London. For services to Education.
- Patricia Diane Chapman, Administrative Officer, H.M. Prison Haverigg, H.M. Prison Service, Home Office.
- William Chapman, Agronomist, Scottish Agricultural College. For services to Agriculture.
- Dr. Nazir Ahmed Chaudhry, Vice-Chairman, Scottish Pakistani Association. For services to Race and Community Relations.
- Eric Ronald Cheer, Electronics Systems Designer, BAE Systems. For services to the Defence Industry.
- Susan Elizabeth Cheney. For services to the St. John Ambulance Brigade in Sussex.
- Marie Teresa Cherry. For services to the St. Bernadette Club and to the community in Newcastle upon Tyne.
- Foysol Hussain Choudhury, Secretary, Edinburgh and Lothian's Equality Council. For services to Community Relations.
- Peter Christie, First Line Manager, H.M. Prison Barlinnie, Scottish Prison Service.
- Marion Christmas. For services to the People of The Gambia.
- Barbara Clague. For services to Education and to the community in South East London.
- Joseph Clarke. For services to the Northern Ireland Chest and Stroke Association.
- Peter Clements. For services to the community in West Mersea, Essex.
- Robert John Clements, Head of Secretariat, H.M. Prison Downview, H.M. Prison Service, Home Office.
- Dawn Elizabeth Anne Booth-Clibborn, Co-ordinator, Punch and Judy Family Centre. For services to the community in Earls Court, London.
- Andrew Cobbold, Grade C2, Ministry of Defence.
- Ben Christopher Cohen. For services to Rugby Union.
- Roger David Stephen Cole. For services to Partnership Working.
- Margaret Ann Colley, Administrative Assistant, Department for Work and Pensions.
- Dennis Collins, Administrative Officer, Department for Work and Pensions.
- Mary Collins, Co-ordinator, Clydebank Unemployed and Community Resource Centre. For services to the community in Clydebank, Dumbarton.
- William Janson Collins. For services to Tennis in Ayrshire.
- Hazel Jean Collis. For charitable services in Burntwood, Staffordshire.
- Elizabeth Mary Colquhoun, Caseworker Support, Inland Revenue.
- Elizabeth Ann Cook, Marketing Communications Manager, Environment Agency. For services to Flood Defence.
- Dr. Roger Cook. For services to Scientific Research within the Agricultural Research Sector.
- Janet Coombs, Education Manager, H.M. Prison Wakefield. For services to Prisoners' Learning and Skills.
- John Michael Cooper, lately Chairman, The Chichester Canal Society, now The Chichester Ship CanalTrust. For services to the Restoration of the Chichester Canal.
- Denise Cope, Senior Officer, Lincolnshire Probation Area. For services to the National Probation Service.
- Robert James Copper, Author and Performer. For services to Folk Music.
- Martin Corry. For services to Rugby Union.
- Ronald Robert John Coulter. For services to the Northern Ireland Fire Brigade.
- Christine Court, Head, Occupational Therapy, Bro Morgannwg NHS Trust. For services to the NHS in Wales.
- Donald Stanley Courten, J.P. For services to Education and to the community in Wolverhampton, West Midlands.
- Sandra Mary Cox. For services to the Royal Mail and charities in Leamington Spa.
- Nigel Crocker, Milkman. For services to the community in Broad Town, Wiltshire.
- Alexander Llewellyn Wallace Crombie. For services to Visually Impaired People and to the community in Leicestershire and Rutland.
- Diane Crouch, Teaching Assistant, Friars Primary Foundation School, Southwark, London. For services to Education.
- Barry Cruse. For services to the community in Bath.
- Charles Douglas Cruse, Handyman, John of Gaunt School, Trowbridge, Wiltshire. For services to Education.
- Margaret Currie. For public service.
- Tony Curtis. For charitable services in South East Wales.
- Thomas Dailly. For services to Community Relations in Tayside.
- Lawrence Bruno Nero Dallaglio. For services to Rugby Union.
- Graham Vallance Darrah, President, Hampshire and Isle of Wight Wildlife Trust. For services to Conservation in Hampshire.
- Leonora Davies, Music Education Consultant, Haringey, London. For services to Education.
- Gladys Davis, Receptionist, University of Edinburgh. For services to Education.
- Dr. Ann Leah Dawson. For services to Relate, Greater Manchester, South.
- Matthew James Sutherland Dawson. For services to Rugby Union.
- Henry Charles Day, B.E.M., Founder, Young Citizens Guild. For services to Young People in Norfolk and Essex.
- Barbara Daykin, Volunteer Classroom Assistant, Morley Primary School, Ilkeston, Derbyshire. For services to Education.
- Eric Deakin. For services to Swimming and Life-saving in Liverpool.
- Peter Deeks, Ferry Manager and Principal Operator, Woolwich Free Ferry, London. For services to Transport in London.
- Leonard Victor George Dennis. For services to the Meat Industry, especially the Butchers' and Drovers' Charitable Institution.
- Vanessa Denza (Mrs. Tomlinson). For services to the British Fashion Industry.
- Amratlal Ghelabhai Desai. For services to Community Relations in North London.
- Anjali Dey, New Deal Personal Adviser, Jobcentre Plus, Department for Work and Pensions.
- Amarjit Singh Dhillon. For services to the Asian Community in South East London.
- Jeanne Hazel Diamond. For services to Childminding in Redbridge, Essex.
- Frederick Dibnah, Television Presenter. For services to Heritage and Broadcasting.
- Janet Dickson. For services to the Victims of Crime in Lewisham, London.
- Stephanie Joan Diver. For services to the community in Dalston, Cumbria.
- Veronica Dockerill, Higher Executive Officer, UK Passport Service.
- Seamus James Joseph Donnelly, Area Adviser, Scottish Agricultural College Advisory Service. For services to Farming and to the community in Wigtownshire.
- Roland Lee Doven, J.P. For services to the community, particularly in Lambeth, London.
- Roy William Dowell, Financial Controls Manager, Employment Tribunals Service, Department of Trade and Industry.
- Alec William Duncan, Regional Sales Director, Vosper Thornycroft. For services to Export.
- Dr. James Duncan, lately Scientist, Scottish Crop Research Institute. For services to Agriculture and Biological Research.
- Ralph Llewellyn Durbridge, Constable, Hertfordshire Constabulary. For services to the Police.
- Shiraz Durrani. For services to Public Libraries.
- Eric Lewis Dutton. For services to the community in Cardiff.
- Zita Eckett, Deputy Registrar, Southampton Institute. For services to Higher Education.
- Jeffrey Edwards, Chairman, Aberfan and Merthyr Vale Youth and Community Project. For services to the community in Merthyr Tydfil.
- Lawrence English. For services to Transport Education and Training in West Yorkshire.
- John Errington, Co-ordinator, Aston-Makunduchi Partnership; Teacher, Aston Comprehensive School, Sheffield. For services to International Citizenship and School Partnerships.
- David Gareth Evans, Musical Director, Morriston Rugby Football Club Choir. For services to Music and Rugby in Swansea.
- John Evans, Managing Director, Thomson, Llantrisant. For services to Economic Development in South East Wales.
- Lisa Jane Evans, Grade E2, Ministry of Defence.
- Peter Whinray Evans, Senior Policy Officer, Countryside Agency. For services to Rural Craft Training.
- Stuart John Falla, Chairman, 2003 Island Games Organising Committee. For services to the 2003 Island Games in Guernsey.
- David Farrow, Divisional Officer, Metropolitan Special Constabulary. For services to the Police.
- Dr. Agnelo Teles Fernandes, General Medical Practitioner, Croydon, Surrey. For services to Healthcare.
- Brenda Finnigan, Member, Watervoice Central. For services to the Water Industry.
- Howard Nicol Firth, Director, Orkney and Moray Science Festival. For services to Popular Science.
- Malcolm Fleming, Chief Executive, CDA Limited. For services to the UK Oil and Gas Industry.
- Peter Max Davy Flemmich. For services to the community in Darvel, Ayrshire.
- Dr. Bruce Fogle, Co-Founder, Hearing Dogs for Deaf People. For services to Deaf People.
- Leonard John Forge. For services to Amateur Football Administration.
- Michael Helden Forster. For services to the Royal Air Force Association in Norfolk.
- Janet Clare Fripp, Personnel Officer, Surrey Probation Area. For services to the National Probation Service.
- Jennifer Ann Furness, Caseworker, Enforcement Section, Inland Revenue.
- Anthony John Cedric Fyson, Journalist. For services to Town Planning and Urban Environmental Education.
- Kiki Gale, Artistic Director, East London Dance. For services to Dance.
- Joan Marie Gallagher, Secretary, Grangetown Community Concern. For services to the community in Grangetown, Cardiff.
- Royce Gardener, Chairman, Gwent Police Pensioners' Association. For services to the Police.
- David Geeves. For services to the Royal Mail and the Countryside Agency in the South West.
- Dr. Ian George Longrigg Gibson, General Medical Practitioner, Braintree, Essex. For services to Healthcare.
- James Daniel Gibson, Swimmer. For services to Swimming.
- John Henry Ferrers Giddings. For services to the Burma Star Association in Banbury, Oxfordshire.
- Reginald Shirley Gilbert, J.P. For services to Young People, through the Reg Gilbert International Youth Friendship Trust, Frome, Somerset.
- Derek Giles. For services to the University of Aberdeen.
- Joyce Mary Gilmour, Headteacher, Ferryhill Primary School, Edinburgh. For services to Education.
- Ismail Yusuf Ginwalla. For services to the community in Gloucester.
- Colin John Goddard. For services to the Nuclear Industry.
- Martin Godfrey, Chairman, Hollington Club, Camberwell, London. For services to Young People.
- Brian Golding, Volunteer Sports Instructor, St. Gregory's Roman Catholic Primary School, Workington, Cumbria. For services to Education.
- Andrew Charles Thomas Gomarsall. For services to Rugby Union.
- Suzanne Mary Rae Goodall. For services to Ty Hafan Children's Hospice, Wales.
- Elizabeth Kate Goodchild, Head, Dorchester Ballet and Dance Club. For services to Dance.
- Michael Goodridge, Governor, Godalming College, Surrey. For services to Further Education.
- Winifred Rosemary Ann Goodwin, Organiser and Fund Raiser, Cheswardine in Bloom. For services to charity and to the community in Market Drayton, Shropshire.
- Kay Goss, Volunteer Co-ordinator, Northamptonshire Probation Area. For services to the National Probation Service.
- David William Graham. For services to the Independent Monitoring Board, H.M. Prison The Mount, Hemel Hempstead, Hertfordshire.
- Mary May Graham. For services to the community in Clackmannan.
- Pauline Graham, lately Revenue Officer, Inland Revenue.
- Fiona Margaret Grant, Joint President, Institute of Tourist Guiding. For services to the Tourist Industry.
- John Turner Grantham. For services to the community in Pershore, Worcestershire.
- Patricia Maureen Grayburn, D.L., Head, Arts Programme, University of Surrey. For services to the Arts.
- Paul James Grayson. For services to Rugby Union.
- John Kenneth William Green. For services to the South Downs Planetarium and Science Centre in Chichester, West Sussex.
- Stanley Green, J.P. For services to the Royal Air Forces Association in Grampian.
- William John Heaton Greenwood. For services to Rugby Union.
- Daniel Jonathan Grewcock. For services to Rugby Union.
- Barbara Irene Griffiths. For services to Macmillan Cancer Relief in South Wales.
- Christine Mary Griffiths, Honours and Appointments Secretary, Department for Environment, Food and Rural Affairs.
- Donald William Griffiths. For services to the Air Training Corps in Tenby, Pembrokeshire.
- Eifion Wyn Griffiths. For services to St. John Ambulance Brigade in Powys.
- Jennifer Griffiths, District Information Officer, Jobcentre Plus, Department for Work and Pensions.
- Timothy Haigh, Chair of Governors, Valley Road School, Henley-on-Thames, Oxfordshire. For services to Education.
- Doreen Hailes, lately School Crossing Warden, St. Cuthbert's School, Chester-le-Street. For services to Education.
- James Rushworth Haines. For services to the Independent Monitoring Board, H.M. Prison Wymott, Lancashire and the Independent Monitoring Board National Advisory Council.
- Lois Hainsworth. For services to the Women's International Commission, the Baha'i Office for the Advancement of Women and UNIFEM UK.
- David Gerard Halicki, Senior Risk Manager and Medical Devices Liaison Officer, Stockport NHS Trust. For services to the NHS.
- Alan Hall, lately Acting Operational Manager, H.M. Prison Manchester, H.M. Prison Service, Home Office.
- Colin David Hall, Detective Constable, Metropolitan Police Service. For services to the Police.
- Hyacinth Hall. For services to the community in Bristol.
- Marlene Florence Joyce Hall. For services to the Mothers' Union.
- Anthony Hand, Coach and Player, Edinburgh Capitals Ice Hockey Team. For services to Ice Hockey.
- David Reid Hanna, Chairman, Alnaveigh House Cultural Society. For services to the community in Newry, Co. Down.
- Paul Martin Hannan, J.P., Chief Executive, Aberdeen Cyrenians Charity. For services to Homeless People in Aberdeen.
- Jean Elizabeth Harding. For services to the WRVS in Winchester, Hampshire.
- Arthur De'Alba William Harris. For services to the community in East Chinnock, Yeovil, Somerset.
- David Thomas Harrison, Lifeboat Operations Manager. For services to the RNLI, Hunstanton, Norfolk.
- Simon Harrison, lately Headteacher, Ifield School, Gravesend, Kent. For services to Special Needs Education.
- Peter McKenzie Harte, Founder, Harte Buses. For services to the Bus Industry in Scotland.
- Noel Grace Hartle. For services to the Citizens' Advice Bureau, Dacorum, Hertfordshire.
- Douglas Hartley. For services to the St. John Ambulance Brigade in Wales.
- Jean Harvey, Senior Executive Officer, Department for Work and Pensions.
- Roy Hawker, Freelance Cheese Grader. For services to the Dairy Sector.
- Caroline Haworth, Co-ordinator, Bath Area Play Project. For services to Children.
- Paulette Winsome Haye, Nurse, Chest Clinic, Wythenshawe Hospital, Manchester. For services to Specialist Respiratory Nursing.
- Gerald Albert Wallington-Hayes. For services to the community in Harwich, Essex.
- Dianne Hayle. For services to the Parole Board.
- Anne Veronica Heaney. For services to the St. John Ambulance Brigade.
- David Heddle. For services to Disabled Bowls.
- Thomas Glyndwr Joseph Heller. For services to Agricultural and Horticultural Research.
- Robert Douglas Henry, Chief Executive, CORGI. For services to the Gas Industry.
- Eleanor Herbert, Administrative Officer, Finance, Vehicle and Operator Services Agency.
- Elizabeth Hibbert, Secretary, Greater Manchester Police. For services to the Police.
- Dorothy Margaret Hickling, President, North London District, Girls' Brigade. For services to Young People.
- Janet Clare Hickman, Assistant Assurance Officer, H.M. Customs and Excise.
- Charles Hill, Operations Manager, NAAFI. For services to the Armed Forces.
- David Danby Hill, Farmer. For services to Agriculture in the South West.
- Richard Hill. For services to Rugby Union.
- Ursula Muriel Hill. For services to the League of Friends, Queen Alexandra Hospital, Portsmouth.
- Dr. David Hilling, Member, Waterways Freight Forum Board. For services to Inland Waterways.
- Andy Hine, Chairman, Roller Coaster Club of Great Britain. For services to the Tourist Industry.
- Lieutenant Colonel Malcolm Hitchcott. For services to the Soldiers' and Airmen's Scripture Readers Association.
- Peter Hobley, Voluntary Teacher, St. Mary's Roman Catholic Primary School, Hammersmith and Dog Kennel Hill Primary School, East Dulwich, London. For services to Education.
- Robert Nicholas Hodges, Connexions Personal Adviser, Sheffield. For services to Young People.
- Major Neville Hogan. For services to the Chindits Old Comrades Association.
- Caroline Hogg, Grade D, Ministry of Defence.
- Helen Brodie Holdsworth, Chair, Campaign for Fairer Fair Rents. For services to the Private Tenants' Rights Movement.
- Grace Helen Pat Hollands. For services to Badminton in Cornwall.
- Linda Kathleen Mary Holme, Grade D, Ministry of Defence.
- Thomas Hooper, Joint President, Institute of Tourist Guiding. For services to the Tourist Industry.
- John Deane Houston, Chief Executive Officer, Blind Centre for Northern Ireland. For services to the Blind.
- Beverley William Howard, lately Scout Leader. For services to Young People in Buckinghamshire.
- Thelma Susannah Howard, School Crossing Warden, Toll Bar Primary School, Doncaster. For services to Education.
- Margaret Rose Hudson, Grade E1, Ministry of Defence.
- Adrian David Hughes, Retained Officer, Mid and West Wales Fire Brigade. For services to the Fire Service.
- David Humphreys. For services to Rugby Football.
- John Anthony Hunt, Team Leader, North Yorkshire County Council. For services to the Restoration of Bridges in North Yorkshire.
- Dr. Judith Marylyn Hunter, Honorary Curator, Windsor Museums Group. For services to Museums.
- Miriam Carlisle Hunter. For public service.
- Ashiq Hussain, J.P., Councillor, Derby Council. For services to the community in Derby.
- Francis James Inston. For services to the WRVS in Benfleet, Essex.
- Malcolm John Isaac, Chairman, Vitacress Salads Ltd. For services to the Fresh Produce Industry and to Horticultural Research.
- Valerie Joan Jackman. For services to the communities in Brean and Berrow, Somerset and to British Gymnastics.
- Brenda May James. For services to the community in Carmarthenshire.
- Nevil Arthur James. For services to the community in Llandaff, Cardiff.
- Nicholas James, Premises Manager, Brent Knoll School, Lewisham, London. For services to Special Needs Education.
- John Arnold Janzen. For services to the community in Teddington, Middlesex.
- Elizabeth Jean Jenkins. For services to Workers' Health and Safety.
- Kathleen Jenkins. For services to Victims of Crime in Nottinghamshire.
- William Miles Jessop. For services to the community in Borrowdale, Cumbria.
- Leighton Johns, Registration Officer, Swansea District Land Registry.
- The Reverend Christopher Robert Johnson, lately Chair of Governors, John Baskeyfield Church of England School, Burslem, Staffordshire. For services to Education.
- Henry Johnston. For services to Carers in Wales and to the community in Pembrokeshire.
- Derek Jones, B.E.M., Grade D, Ministry of Defence.
- Frances May Jones. For services to Cancer Charities in North Wales.
- Hugh Gareth Jones, Honorary Chair, National Deaf Children's Society. For services to Deaf Children.
- Nigel Patrick Jones, Training Programme Manager, National Specialist Law Enforcement Centre. For services to the Police.
- Penelope Jones, Senior Teaching Assistant, Bexhill High School, Bexhill-on-Sea, East Sussex. For services to Education.
- Rosalie Jorda, Senior Personal Secretary, Department for Constitutional Affairs.
- Sandra Ross Kara, Secretary, Bishops Waltham Minibus Group. For services to disabled people in Southampton.
- David Kaufman. For services to the community in Lisson Grove, London.
- Benedict James Kay. For services to Rugby Union.
- Judith Ann Keay, Head, Student Services, Kent Institute of Art and Design. For services to Education.
- Aedan Kerney, Head of Music and Director of Performing Arts, Boundstone Community College, Lancing, West Sussex. For services to Education.
- Derek William Kerr, County Organiser, Leicestershire and Rutland Young Farmers' Clubs. For services to Young People.
- William Patrick Kerridge, Campus Manager, Sandringham School, St. Albans, Hertfordshire. For services to Education.
- Farzand Ali Khan. For services to Community Relations in Huddersfield, West Yorkshire.
- Syeda Khatun, Councillor, Sandwell Metropolitan Borough Council. For services to the community in Sandwell, West Midlands.
- Zarina Kheraj. For services to Education in Tajikistan.
- Maura Kiely, Chairperson, The Cross Group. For services to the community in Northern Ireland.
- Elizabeth Killian, Area Administrator, Wirral Magistrates' Court. For services to the Magistrates' Court Service in Merseyside.
- James Brown Kilpatrick, Pipe Band Drummer. For services to Music.
- Barbara King. For services to the British Red Cross Society in South Yorkshire.
- Brenda Ann King, Chair, African and Caribbean Finance Forum. For services to the African and Caribbean Communities.
- Derek King. For public service.
- Susan Janice Kinsella, Nursery Nurse, Wolf Fields Primary School, Southall, London. For services to Education.
- Councillor James Talbot Kirkwood, Chair of Governors, Caerleon Comprehensive School, Newport. For services to Education and to the community in South East Wales.
- Heeranand Lachiram Kirpalani, Grade C1, Ministry of Defence.
- Dr. Susan Mary Kohler, Chair, Friends of the Botanical Gardens, Sheffield. For services to the community in Sheffield.
- Kenneth William Lacey. For services to the community in Weston-super-Mare.
- Eleanor Ruth Lambert, Chairman, Machynlleth Tabernacle Trust. For services to Culture in Mid Wales.
- Stuart Lambie. For services to Education and to the community in the Isle of Man.
- Dawne Angela Laming, Science Technician, Sheffield College. For services to Education.
- William John Lamont. For public service.
- Brian Frederick Langridge, Sales Director, Hoben International. For services to Business and International Trade.
- Phillip John Larder. For services to Rugby Union.
- Dorothy Larkin. For services to the Citizens' Advice Bureau, Hillingdon, London.
- Frank Alexander Latham. For services to Heritage in Cheshire.
- Raymond Law, Concert Promoter. For services to Music in Warwickshire.
- David Laws, Performance Development Manager, H.M. Customs and Excise.
- Jean Lawson, lately Leader, Nunthorpe School Girls Choir, Middlesbrough. For services to Education.
- Frances Lennon, Artist. For services to Art and Charity in Manchester.
- Dr. Rosemary Anne Leonard, Broadcaster and General Medical Practitioner, South London. For services to Healthcare.
- Dorothy Leslie. For services to the Samaritans and to the community in Horsham, West Sussex.
- Louis Robert Christopher Lethbridge. For services to the community in Buckland, Oxfordshire.
- Owen Joshua Lewsey. For services to Rugby Union.
- (Rita) Margaret Cuthbertson Lindsay. For services to the community in Strone, Argyll.
- Jean Littlefield. For charitable services in Cornwall.
- Loy Seng Liu. For services to the community in Farnham, Surrey.
- Alan Christopher Lloyd. For services to Life Saving and to Young People in Swansea.
- Jeffery Bannerman Lockett, D.L., Artistic Director, Clonter Opera. For services to Music.
- William Lawrence Lohmeier. For services to the community in Guernsey.
- Brian William Long. For services to the Peterborough Cathedral Development and Preservation Trust Appeal, Cambridgeshire.
- Martin William Long, Head, Pension Services, Inland Revenue.
- Richard Lowrie, Compliance Group Manager, Inland Revenue.
- Mary Rose Lubel. For services to the community in Southend-on-Sea, Essex.
- Daniel Darko Luger. For services to Rugby Union.
- George Roderick MacDonald. For services to War Pensioners in Caithness.
- John MacInnes. Organisation Development Executive, Rolls-Royce. For services to the Engineering and Aerospace Industries in Scotland.
- Roslyn MacIver. For services to Yorkhill Children's Hospital, Glasgow.
- William James MacKay, Artificial Inseminator, Genus. For services to the Agricultural community in Caithness and Sutherland.
- Dr. Donald MacKerron, Consultant Environmental Physiologist. For services to Agricultural and Biological Research.
- Arthur Patrick Pringle Mackie. For services to Wildlife Conservation in Northern Ireland.
- Jenni Manners, Manager, Swindon Women's Refuge. For services to Victims of Domestic Violence.
- Susan Mary Marley, Administrative Officer, Department for Work and Pensions.
- Meinwen Marsh, Chief Executive, Cornwall Mobility Centre. For services to disabled people.
- Tony Martin. For services to the community in Dollar, Clackmannanshire.
- Fay Maschler, Restaurant Critic. For services to Journalism.
- Brian Norman Wilson Matheson, Business Support Manager, H.M. Customs and Excise.
- Alison Josephine Stanley Matthews, Chairman, Itchen Valley Parish Council. For services to Local Government.
- Austin Vaughan Matthews, Director, Engineering Education Scheme for Wales. For services to Education Business Links.
- Dorothy May Matthews. For services to the British Red Cross Society in Devon.
- Jeffery Edward Matthews. For services to Graphic Design, particularly Postage Stamps.
- Noreen Cameron Maude, Personal Assistant, Horticulture Research International. For services to Horticutural Research.
- Eric McLean Maxwell. For charitable services through the Maxwell Family Foundation.
- Deborah McBean, Farmer. For services to Agriculture.
- Ruth Margaret Eleanor McCartney, Director of Music, Methodist College, Belfast. For services to Education.
- Hugh John McClintock, Chairman, Pedals. For services to Cycling.
- Judith Margaret McCormick. For services to Victim Support, Northern Ireland.
- Dr. Andrew McCrea, Manager, Environmental Services, Northern Ireland Electricity plc. For services to the Electricity Industry.
- Alfred McCreary, Journalist. For services to Journalism and Charity in Northern Ireland.
- Phillip Stuart McCusker, Driver, Babcock Naval Services. For services to the Defence Industry.
- Annette McDonald, Executive Officer, Department for Work and Pensions.
- Alison Ridgway McFeat. For services to Abertay Housing Association, Dundee.
- Garth McGimpsey, Golfer. For services to Golf.
- Robert McKee, Mayor, Larne Borough Council. For services to Local Government.
- William Tonar McMahon, lately Honorary Treasurer, Royal Television Society.
- Stanley McMurtry (Mac), Cartoonist, Daily Mail. For services to the Newspaper Industry.
- Gertrude Dorothy, Mrs. Melsome. For services to the community in Bovingdon, Hertfordshire.
- The Honourable Ruth Jacquelyn Leslie Melville. For services to the community in Angus.
- Marjorie Ann Milam, lately Processing Officer, Office for National Statistics.
- Myra McDonald Minty, Nurse. For services to Nursing in North East Scotland.
- Manilal Iccharam Mistry. For services to Race Relations in the North West.
- Paul Anthony Mockett, Ceremonial Bugler. For services to Ex-Service Men and Women.
- Alexandria Roberta Moffitt, Warden, Ulster Wildlife Trust. For services to the Conservation of Wildlife.
- Valerie Irene Montero, Executive Officer, Homelessness Directorate, Office of the Deputy Prime Minister.
- Neil Montgomery, Police Officer. For services to Grampian Police.
- Lewis Walton Moody. For services to Rugby Union.
- Derek Graham Moon, Secretary, Sugar Association of London. For services to the Sugar Industry.
- Mary Moore. For services to the League of Friends, South Molton Hospital, Devon.
- Lorraine Amy Moran, Deputy Head, School of Care Science, University of Glamorgan. For services to Nursing and Higher Education.
- Graham Morgan, Advocacy Project Manager, Highland Community Forum. For services to Mental Health in Highland.
- John Morgan. For charitable services in Leeds.
- David Ian Morris. For services to the community in Richmond and Swaledale, North Yorkshire.
- Alan Moy, Park Gardener, Tynedale District Council. For services to Local Government.
- Zulfiqar Ali Mulak, Head, Housing Needs, London Borough of Hackney. For services to the Homeless.
- William Mullen. For services to Young People in Drumchapel, Glasgow.
- Rosemary Ann Mumford. For services to the community in the Isles of Scilly.
- Professor John Murrell, lately Postgraduate Tutor, Homerton College, Cambridge. For services to Higher Education.
- Winnifred Naylor. For services to the community in Altrincham, Greater Manchester.
- Dorothy Gaik Poh Neoh, Manager, San Jai Chinese Project, Glasgow. For services to Race Equality.
- Evelyn Newell, Senior Care Assistant, Cairnshill Fold. For services to Elderly People in Northern Ireland.
- Elizabeth Prattis Niccolls, Human Resources and Business Improvement Manager, AMS. For services to the Defence Industry.
- Victor George Noake. For services to the Apollo Swimming Club, Sherborne, Dorset and Yeovil, Somerset.
- Dr. Carol Ann Norris, Consultant. For services to Geriatric Medicine.
- Francis Malachy Norton. For public service.
- Michael Daniel O'Driscoll, Executive Officer, Jobcentre Plus, Department for Work and Pensions.
- David Michael O'Grady, Constable, Metropolitan Police Service. For services to the Police and Convoy 2000 Charity.
- Eamon O'Hara. For services to Swimming, Rugby and the local community in Coleraine, Northern Ireland.
- David John Ogden, Detective Sergeant, Hampshire Constabulary. For services to the Police and Disadvantaged Children.
- William Brian Oliphant. For services to the community in Londonderry and to the Omagh Fund.
- Mary Oliver, Special Needs Officer, Conwy Education Authority. For services to People with Special Needs.
- Michael Frederick Oliver. For services to the Great Dorset Steam Fair.
- Robert James Ollason, Head of Education, Royal Zoological Society of Scotland, Edinburgh. For services to Education.
- Vincent Michael Osgood, Programm Manager, Engineering and Physical Sciences Research Council. For services to Science.
- Janet Owen. For services to the Corporation and City of London.
- Albert Daniel Owens. For public service.
- Malcolm John Park, Director and Secretary, Intellect. For services to the Postal Industry.
- Colin Partington, Principal Safety Adviser, Sellafield. For services to Health and Safety in the Nuclear Industry.
- Richard James Paterson, Guide, Cawdor Castle. For services to Dendrology.
- Anne Patrizio. For services to the Lesbian, Gay, Bisexual and Transgender community in Scotland.
- Vilma Patterson. For services to Business and to the community in Belfast.
- Christopher Peachey, Farmer. For services to the Agricultural community in Gloucestershire.
- Mabel Pearce, lately Co-ordinator, Rhondda Victims Support Scheme. For services to Victims of Crime in Mid Glamorgan.
- Anthony Perch. For services to The Guildhall School of Music and Drama, London.
- Mary Percy, Secretary, British Airways 25 Year Club. For services to Aviation Staff.
- Moira Perritt. For services to Sport and to the community in Fintry, Stirlingshire.
- Ella Phaup. For services to the community in Selkirk.
- Marlene Pickup, Senior Executive Officer, Department for Work and Pensions.
- Lucreta Evette La Pierre. For services to the community in Lewisham, London.
- Margaret Vera Pinson, Senior Nurse, Child Protection. For services to Social Care in Salford.
- Gordon Pirie. For services to the Boys' Brigade in Banffshire.
- Gail Jacqueline Plant. For services to Young People and to the community in Brownhills, Walsall.
- Mary Myfanwy Platt. For services to the St. John Ambulance Brigade in Merseyside.
- Doris Margaret Poole. For services to the WRVS and the community in Worcestershire.
- Beverley Powell, Chair, African Caribbean Association. For services to the community in Chesterfield, Derbyshire.
- Derith Powell, Chief Executive, Amman Valley Enterprise. For services to Community Development and to Social Inclusion in Wales.
- Mavis Powys, lately Medical Receptionist, Caerau, Bridgend. For services to Healthcare.
- David William Pratt, B.E.M., Grade C2, Ministry of Defence.
- Ada Agnes Price, Trustee, Island History Trust. For services to Heritage in East London.
- Susan Ross Proctor, D.L., Councillor, Cheshire County Council. For services to the community in Chester.
- ally Elizabeth Pugh, Band B2, Cabinet Office.
- Susan Joan Pullen, J.P. For services to the community in Churchdown, Gloucestershire.
- Irene Pym. For services to the community in Upottery, Devon.
- Jane Mary Raimes, Chief Executive, Dorset Community Action. For services to the community in Dorset.
- Dr. Edmund Berkeley Ranby, Treasurer, Chester Music Society. For services to Music in Chester.
- Christopher John Raven Ratcliff. For services to the Parish Prospect Preston in Lancashire.
- Timothy Harvey Ratcliffe. For services to Community Relations in Bradford.
- Maureen Ray. For services to the community in St. Albans, Hertfordshire.
- Rosa Marlene Rayner, Personal Secretary to the Chief Inspector, Office for Standards in Education.
- Edward Frank Raynham, Court Manager, The Court Service, Department for Constitutional Affairs.
- Marjorie Rose Reader, Senior Personal Secretary, Department for Culture, Media and Sport.
- David Reddin. For services to Rugby Union.
- Joan Grace Rees, Mental Health Act Manager, Cardiff and Vale NHS Trust. For services to the NHS.
- Mark Regan. For services to Rugby Union.
- Ann Morag Reid. For services to the Royal Infirmary of Edinburgh.
- Gordon George Reid, Chief Test Pilot, Civil Aviation Authority. For services to Aviation.
- Michael Shane Reilly, Group Managing Director, Sonatest plc. For services to Business in Oxfordshire and Buckinghamshire.
- Elizabeth Lawrie Renfrew, Physiotherapist. For services to Physiotherapy on Islay and Jura.
- Emma Charlotte Richards, Yachtswoman. For services to Sailing.
- Frederick Henry Pearce Richards. For services to Church Music in Devon.
- Laurence Stanley Richards, Assistant Principal, Sir Harry Smith Community College, Whittlesey, Cambridgeshire. For services to Education.
- Susan Mary Richmond. For services to the WRVS in Paisley.
- Cynthia Dawn Watts Rickitt, Chairman, South of Tyne and Wearside Mental Health NHS Trust. For services to the NHS.
- Elizabeth Ann Riley, lately Special Constable, Devon and Cornwall Constabulary. For services to the Police.
- Patrick Stanley Ripton, Environment Protection Officer, Environment Agency. For services to the Environment in Essex.
- David Peter Roberts, Welfare and Counselling Officer, Avon and Somerset Police. For services to the Police.
- Joanna Roberts, Volunteer, Benthal Junior School, Hackney, London. For services to Education.
- Ann Robertson. For services to the Royal British Legion, Women's Section, Scotland.
- Douglas George Robertson. For services to the Abbeyfield Society for Scotland and the Scottish National Blood Transfusion Association.
- Jessie Robertson. For services to the communities in Wigtown and Stranraer.
- Jason Thorpe Robinson. For services to Rugby Union.
- John Robinson. For services to Mental Health in the London Borough of Bromley and East Kent.
- Charles Edward Robson. For services to the community in Southwark, London.
- Melanie Carol Robson, Administrative Officer, Department for Work and Pensions.
- Angela Roden. For services to the Christie's Against Cancer Appeal, Christie Hospital, Manchester.
- Alan Ernest Rogers, Constable, Warwickshire Police. For services to the Police and to the community in Warwick.
- Dilwyn John Rogers, lately Manager, The Duke of Edinburgh's Award Scheme, South Wirral High School, Eastham, Wirral. For services to Young People.
- Lee Antony Rogerson, Project Manager, OnSite, YMCA, Coventry. For services to Young People.
- Dr. Jonathan Anidjar Romain. For services to Community Relations.
- Eric Ross, School Janitor, Grange Primary School, Bo'ness. For services to Education.
- Jonathan William Ross, Prison Officer, Young Offenders Institute, Swinfen Hall. For services to Charity.
- Samuel John Ruscoe, Farm Foreman, Harper Adams University College, Shropshire. For services to Agricultural Education.
- Norma Russell, Breast Care Specialist Nurse, Bradford Hospitals NHS Trust. For services to Healthcare.
- Beryl Cynthia Sainsbury. For services to disabled people and to the community in Stratford-upon-Avon, Warwickshire.
- David Ramsay Saint, Retained Officer, Tayside Fire Brigade. For services to the Fire Service.
- Eileen Dorothy Sandford, Councillor, Shrewsbury and Atcham Borough Council. For services to Local Government.
- John Michael Saville. For services to the community in York.
- Katy Sexton, Swimmer. For services to Swimming.
- Jayantilal Sojar Gosar Shah, Grade E1, Ministry of Defence.
- Rubina Shamim. For services to Community Relations in Crawley, West Sussex.
- Maria Shammas. For services to the British Red Cross Society.
- Diana Sharratt, lately English and Drama Teacher, Queen Elizabeth School, Kirkby Lonsdale, Lancashire. For services to Education.
- Simon Dalton Shaw. For services to Rugby Union.
- Thomas Melville Shearer, Gardener. For services to Horticulture and to the community in Peeblesshire.
- David Sherman, lately Community Learning Manager, Perth and Kinross Council. For services to Young People.
- Mary Shurrock. For services to the community in Stokenchurch, Buckinghamshire.
- Ethel Orr Simpson, Orthopaedic Scheduler, Victoria Infirmary, Glasgow. For services to the NHS in Scotland.
- Amrita Singh, Senior Probation Officer, London Probation Area. For services to the National Probation Service.
- Richard Keith Skues, A.E., Radio Presenter and Producer, BBC Radio (Eastern Counties). For services to Broadcasting and Charity.
- Ann Denise Smith, Constable, Metropolitan Police Service. For services to the Police.
- Brian George Smith. For services to Health Charities in Croydon.
- Frank Charles Henry Smith, Chairman, Boys' Brigade Re-development Fund for the National Training Centre. For services to Young People.
- George Worsnop Smith. For services to Flower Arranging.
- Joyce Mary Smith. For services to the community in Durrington, Wiltshire.
- Timothy Victor Smith, Founder Leader, Chesham All Girls Marching Band, Buckinghamshire. For services to Young People.
- Terence Peter Snowden. For services to disabled people and to the community in Manchester.
- Richard Arthur Sobey, Director, Exploration and Development, Intrepid Energy North Sea Ltd. For services to the UK Oil and Gas Industry.
- Trevor John Sorbie. For services to Hairdressing.
- Michael John Southall. For services to Young People in the Isle of Man.
- Lynda Mary Speake, Out Patient Manager, Princess Royal Hospital. For services to the NHS in Telford.
- Enid Spellman, Higher Executive Officer, Child Support Agency.
- Mary Spence. For services to Cartographic Design.
- Bridget Spiers. For services to the Special Adventure Playground, North Staffordshire.
- Veronica Anne Spoore, Senior Personal Secretary, Crime Reduction and Community Safety, Home Office.
- William Gerald Stallard, Technical Systems Consultant, Independent Television Faculties Centre. For services to Broadcasting and Disability Issues.
- Elizabeth Jones Stanger, Chair, Adult Education, West Kilbride Community Association. For services to Adult Education.
- Elizabeth Steel (Wendy Patricia Jones) (Mrs. Squires), Founder, Hairline International, the Alopecia Patients' Society. For services to Healthcare.
- Sylvia Steer. For services to the community in Woking, Surrey.
- Professor Philip Michael Stell, Honorary Research Associate, Centre For Medieval Studies, University of York. For services to History.
- Linda Anne Stempt, Team Leader, Commercial Vehicle Licensing Project, Department for Transport.
- Mervin Russell Stokes. For services to the Theatre on the Isle of Man.
- Elizabeth Stone, Administrative Officer, Customer Services, Department for Work and Pensions.
- Judith Angela Storey, Higher Executive Officer, Department for Work and Pensions.
- Roger Stott. For services to the community in North Yorkshire.
- Sheila Strachan. For services to the community in Seaton, Aberdeen.
- Margaret Dobson Street, Founder, Leith Civic Trust. For services to the Built and Cultural Heritage of Scotland.
- Pauline Streeter. For services to the community in Coldwaltham, West Sussex.
- John Robert Styles. For services to the Arts, especially Punch and Judy Shows.
- David Michael Sumner, Chairman, Huddersfield Canal Company. For services to Canal Restoration.
- James Sutton, Premises Officer and Classroom Assistant, Babington Community College, Leicester. For services to Education.
- Christine Swan. For services to Local Government and to the community in Sussex.
- Mabel Aurett Swift. For services to disabled people and to the community in the East Riding of Yorkshire.
- Ali Ahmed Syed. For services to Black and Ethnic Minority communities in Glasgow.
- Ronald Syrad, Chairman, Leukaemia Research Fund.
- Margaret Anne Mary Tait. For services to Residential Care in South West Wales.
- Maureen Taylor, Higher Executive Officer, Jobcentre Plus, Department for Work and Pensions.
- Laura Mary Tenison, Founder and Managing Director, JoJo Maman Be ́be ́ Ltd, Newport. For services to Business in South Wales.
- Collette Ann Thain. For services to those with Primary Biliary Cirrhosis.
- Jill Theis. For services to Architectural Heritage in Bexhill, East Sussex.
- Beverley Anne Thomas, Headteacher, St. Francis Roman Catholic Infant School, Cardiff. For services to Education.
- Clare Thomas, Chief Executive Officer, Bridge House Trust. For services to Charity.
- William Alan Thomas, Coxswain. For services to the RNLI, Tenby, Pembrokeshire.
- Brian Thompson, Honorary Treasurer. For services to the RNLI branches in Farnworth, Kearsley and Bolton.
- Ralph Shillito Thompson, Wildlife Artist. For services to the Conservation of Wildlife.
- Stephen Geoffrey Thompson. For services to Rugby Union.
- Susanne Gertrud Helene Thompson. For services to Lacemaking.
- Charles Henry Walter Timms, lately Constable, Metropolitan Police Service. For services to the Police.
- Michael James Tindall. For services to Rugby Union.
- Roger John Tingey, T.D., Training Manager, MarshallGroup. For services to the Aerospace Industry.
- Kenneth Francis Tomlinson, lately Chief Executive, Department of Health and Social Security. For services to Health on the Isle of Man.
- Jack Joel Toper. For services to People with Severe Burns, through the Guinea Pig Club.
- William Bruce Stewart Tosh. For public service.
- Audrey Totty, President, Yorkshire Countrywomen's Association. For services to Women in Rural Communities.
- Joan Trowsdale, Teacher, Parish Church School, Skipton, North Yorkshire. For services to Education.
- Jessie Twigg, lately Personal Secretary, Health Department, Scottish Executive.
- Michael Tym, District Officer, West Midlands Special Constabulary. For services to the Police.
- Philip John Vickery. For services to Rugby Union.
- Adelaide Joan Walker. For services to the Friedreich's Ataxia Group in Northern Ireland.
- Dr. Anne Elizabeth Walker, Chief Executive, Springboard UK. For services to the Hospitality Industry.
- Marion Wallace. For services to the community in Inverclyde, Renfrewshire.
- Edward William Walliss, Manager, Boys' Brigade Young People's Camp Site, Bembridge, Isle of Wight. For services to Young People.
- Isobel Doreen Warnock. For services to the Northern Ireland Leukaemia Research Fund.
- Michael Alexander Watson. For services to Disabled Sport.
- Augustine Francis Patmore Watts. For charitable services in East Kent.
- Janette Webb, lately Driver, Government Car Service.
- Grant Webberley, Regional Works Officer, Department for Environment, Food and Rural Affairs.
- Jamie Webster, Yard Convenor, GMB Union. For services to Industrial Relations.
- Alexander West, Managing Director, Westward Fishing Company. For services to the Fishing Industry in Scotland.
- Ann Amelia West, J.P. For services to the community in North Kent.
- Dorian Edward West. For services to Rugby Union.
- Dorothy Lilian Weston. For services to Swimming.
- Peter Wheldale, Assistant Chief Officer, Humberside Fire Brigade. For services to the Fire Service.
- Dr. Anthony White. For services to UK Energy Policy.
- Julian Martin White. For services to Rugby Union.
- Anthony Austin Whitehouse. For services to Road Safety.
- Richard Francis Wiggin, Head Gardener, Royal Shrewsbury Hospital NHS Trust. For services to the NHS.
- Sarah Wigglesworth, Architect. For services to Architecture.
- Kenneth James Wilding. For services to the Royal British Legion and Age Concern in Suffolk.
- Georgina Jasmine Willey, Founder, Arts Interest Group. For services to the Arts in London.
- Anthony John Williams, Deputy Leader, Vale of Glamorgan Council. For services to Local Government and to Conservation in the Vale of Glamorgan.
- Michael Williams. For services to Occupational Health and Safety in West Yorkshire.
- The Reverend Raymond Williams, Project Manager, Bethel Community College and Manager, Neighbourhood Support Fund. For services to Young People in Manchester and Salford.
- Lieutenant Cecil Wilson, Royal Naval Reserve (Retired). For services to the Sea Cadet Corps in York.
- Dr. David Nisbet Wilson, Director, Lead Development Association International. For services to Lead Production.
- Robert Joseph Wilson, Assistant Chief Executive, Belfast City Council. For services to Local Government.
- Dr. Phyllis Margaret Windsor, Clinical Oncologist. For services to Radiotherapy and Oncology.
- Daphne Eleanor Wing. For services to the Community Legal Service and the community in Derbyshire.
- Kenneth Michael Wingfield, Senior Officer, H.M.Young Offender Institution and Remand Centre, Glen Parva.
- Byron John Winter. For services to Industrial Relations.
- Debbie Wiseman, Composer. For services to the Film Industry.
- Michael Wood. For services to disabled people.
- Trevor Leonard Woodger. For services to Engineering Education.
- Trevor James Woodman. For services to Rugby Union.
- Michael Woods. For services to Disadvantaged People in Croatia and Belarus.
- Martin John Woodward, Coxswain. For services to the RNLI, Bembridge, Isle of Wight.
- Roger Thomas Woodward, County Road Safety Officer, Worcestershire County Council. For services to Local Government.
- William Woolfall. For services to the Royal School of Military Engineering through the Jackson Club.
- Joseph Paul Richard Worsley. For services to Rugby Union.
- Andrew James Worthington, Chief Executive, Institute of Leisure and Amenity Management. For services to Sports Administration.
- Eric William Wroe. For services to Elderly People in Sheffield.
- Chaudhry Asif Yaqub, Director, Marketing and International Business Development, Quat-Chem Limited. For services to Exports.
- Kui Shum Yeung, Restaurateur. For services to the Hospitality Industry.

Diplomatic and Overseas List

- Miss Moira Allan, Second Secretary, British Embassy Bogota.
- Miss Lesley Beats, lately Personal Assistant, Foreign and Commonwealth Office.
- Diana Mary, Mrs Beckley. For services to UK–Serbia and Montenegro relations.
- Peter Lewis Beckley. For services to UK–Serbia and Montenegro relations.
- David John Braithwaite. For services to UK–Indonesian relations in the oil and gas sector.
- James Alan Bruce, Second Secretary, Foreign and Commonwealth Office.
- Annabel Audrey, Mrs Buchan, co-ordinator, Anita Goulden Charity. For services to disadvantaged children in Peru.
- Catherine Ingrid, Mrs Buffonge. For services to health education and the community, Montserrat.
- Ms Gwendolyn Trixie Burchell, director, United Aid for Azerbaijan. For services to special education in Azerbaijan.
- Michael Anthony Burns. For services to UK–Irish relations.
- Alexander George Lewis Chippendale. For services to the British and local communities in El Salvador.
- Paul Graham Cleves. For services to disadvantaged children in Vietnam.
- Dr Robin Cooper. For services to the British community in Uruguay.
- James Graham Crawford. For services to British education and the British community in the United Arab Emirates.
- Heather, Mrs Cuff. For services to prison reform, British Virgin Islands.
- Ms Barbara Jill Davidson. For services to the education of blind children in Sierra Leone.
- Paul Michael Dixon, Vice-Consul, British Consulate-General, Bordeaux.
- Ms Thelma Beatrice Dixon, UN Procurement Officer, British Consulate-General, New York.
- Virginia Harriette Anne, Mrs Felton, lately UK Project Director, British American Project. For services to UK–USA relations.
- Catherine Joan, Mrs Francis, lately Personal Assistant to H.M. Ambassador, Jakarta.
- Ms Fiona Mary Frazer, lately Senior Human Rights Officer, OSCE Mission, Mostar.
- Richard John Michael Garcia. For public service, Gibraltar.
- Lauren Elaine, Mrs Grey, Management Officer and Consular Attaché, British High Commission, St Georges.
- The Reverend Margaret Jean Guillebaud. For services to the promotion of national unity and reconciliation in Rwanda.
- Albert Spencer Hamilton, Founder and director, Commonwealth Sports Awards.
- David Maxwell Harvey, lately First Secretary, British Government Office, Baghdad.
- Edward William Hefferman. For services to ex-service men and women in Germany and to UK–German relations.
- Miss Jeanne Katherine Henny, Artistic Director, Mayer–Lismann Opera Centre. For services to UK–Hungarian cultural relations.
- Philip Arthur Jago. For services to environmental development in Egypt.
- Carl Gwynfe Jones. For services to the preservation of endangered species in Mauritius.
- Adrian Leonard Knott. For services to education and music in Belgium.
- Gerhard Michael Landmark. For services to ex-service men and women in Swaziland.
- Russell Keith Law, director, British International School, Jedda.
- Christine Elaine, Mrs Lindemann, Vice-Consul, British Embassy Berlin.
- Lorna Angela, Mrs Martins. For public service, Cayman Islands.
- Connie, Mrs May. For services to the community, especially the elderly, in the Falkland Islands.
- Mark Andrew McGuinness, lately Third Secretary and Vice-Consul, British Embassy Abidjan.
- Miss Naheed Nurudin Mehta, lately First Secretary, attached to Coalition Provisional Authority, Baghdad.
- Anne Pattinson, Mrs Moore. For services to libraries in deprived areas in Papua New Guinea and Kenya.
- David Parker. For services to the British and local communities in Liberia.
- Ian Hedley Pearson, Manager, British Council Peacekeeping English Project, Bosnia and Herzegovina.
- Miss Jean Christina Peters. For services to nursing and the community, St Helena.
- Edwin Donald Pyman. For services to agriculture, the environment and the community in Malawi.
- Peter Sean Raines, managing director, Coral Cay Conservation. For services to the preservation of biodiversity.
- Miss Irma Elizabeth Richardson. For services to the community, Anguilla.
- The Reverend Canon Donald Ruddle. For services to the British community and to prisoners in Northern France.
- Mary, Mrs Thomany. For services to the British community in Germany.
- John Edmund Troop, Second Secretary, Foreign and Commonwealth Office.
- Kathleen May, Mrs Tunsley, Vice-Consul, British Consulate-General Boston.
- Christopher Gilbert Vigar. For services to British business interests in Luxembourg.
- Barry Peter Walker, Honorary Consul, Cusco, Peru.
- Nigel John Watt. For services to the promotion of national reconciliation in Burundi.
- Gillian Elizabeth, Mrs Wight. For services to disabled people in Indonesia.
- Dr Ester Merle Swan Williams. For services to the community, Bermuda.
- Pamela, Mrs Winfield. Founder of the Transatlantic Children's Enterprise (TRACE). For services to the reunification of families in the UK and USA.
