= Caroline Elliot =

Caroline Elliot may refer to:

- Carma Elliot (Caroline Margaret Elliot, born 1964), British diplomat
- Caroline Dawson (also Caroline Elliot and Caroline McKenzie-Dawson), fictional character in BBC TV series Last Tango in Halifax
- Caroline Elliott (born 1984), Canadian politician
