= Eugene Cox =

Eugene Cox may refer to:

- C. Eugene Cox, Bermudian politician
- Eugene Saint Julien Cox, American politician and lawyer
- E. Eugene Cox, US representative from Georgia
