= Anthony Russell-Roberts =

British opera manager (1944–2024)

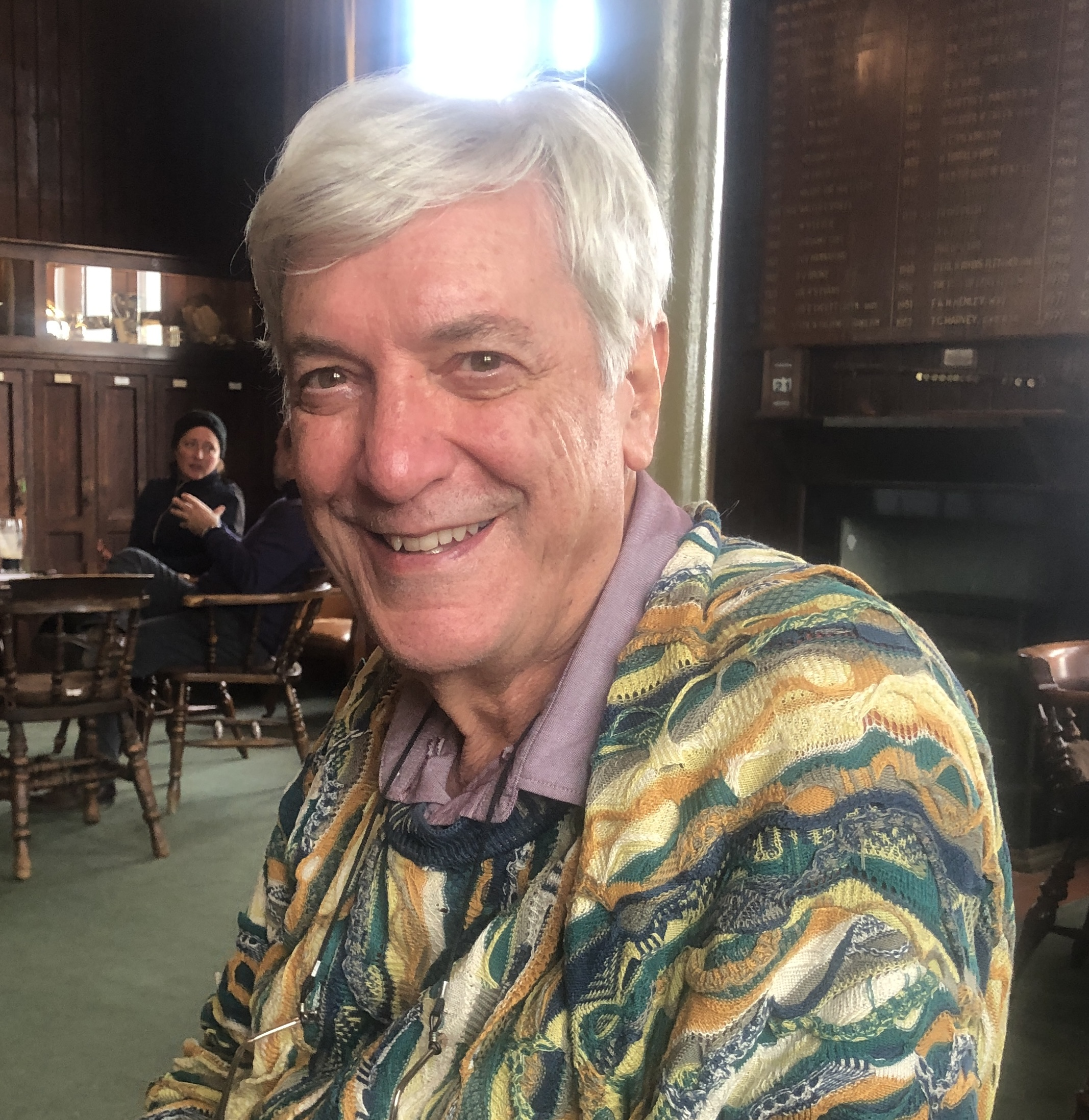
Anthony Russell-Roberts CBE

Anthony de Villeneuve Russell-Roberts CBE (25 March 1944 – 14 January 2024) was a British businessman and opera manager.

== Early life and education ==
Russell-Roberts was the son of Francis Douglas Russell-Roberts and the pianist Edith Margaret Gertrudis Russell-Roberts, née Ashton. He is the nephew of the dancer and choreographer Sir Frederick Ashton and residual legatee of Ashton's will.

Russell-Roberts was educated at Eton College and, after Voluntary Service Overseas in British Honduras, now Belize, (1961–62), at New College, Oxford, where he read Philosophy, Politics, and Economics (BA, MA).

After graduation, having decided that he was unlikely to succeed in his preferred career as a professional painter, Russell-Roberts became a general management trainee at the brewers Watney Mann (1965–68). In 1968 he joined the property agents Lane Fox and Partners, becoming a partner in 1971.

In 1976, his career took a change of direction when he became a stage manager for Glyndebourne Festival Opera, and then in 1977 for Kent Opera. From 1977 until 1980, he was assistant to the general director of the Royal Opera House, and from 1981 until 1983 he was artistic administrator of Opéra National de Paris. In 1983, he returned to the Royal Opera House as administrative director of the Royal Ballet until his retirement in March 2009.

In the 2004 New Year Honours, Russell-Roberts was appointed Commander of the Most Excellent Order of the British Empire "for services to dance".

== Personal life ==
Russell-Roberts was married to the late Jane Holkenfeldt. He had a stepson, Ingo Ferruzzi, and two daughters, Tabitha and Juliet from his previous marriage to Anne Dunhill.

Russell-Roberts was a member of the Garrick Club. From 2000 to 2008, he was a non-executive director of pharmaceutical company, Amarin Corporation.

Russell-Roberts died of cancer on 14 January 2024, at the age of 79.

== Sources and further information ==
- In 1988 inherited Anthony Russell-Roberts Frederick Ashton's Suffolk house and a portfolio of ballets, which can be viewed on www.ashtonballets.com
- Breakfast at the Royal Opera House, BBC News, 6 December 2002, including a link to a video of Breakfast's interview with Russell-Roberts
- New Year Honours List 2004, BBC News, 31 December 2003
- David Vaughan, 'Celebrating Ashton', danceview: a quarterly review of dance, Spring 1999
- Photograph of Russell-Roberts from Washington Life Magazine with Dame Judith Mayhew Jonas DBE (Chairman of the Royal Opera House) His Excellency Mr Karim Kawar (Ambassador of the Hashemite Kingdom of Jordan to the United States) on the occasion of the 75th anniversary of the Royal Ballet
- Suzanne McCarthy, 'Anthony Russell-Roberts', Ballet.co Magazine, July 2002
- Board of Directors, Amarin
- 'RUSSELL-ROBERTS, Anthony de Villeneuve', Debrett's People of Today (12th edn, London: Debrett's Peerage, 1999), p. 1713
- appointed a CBE in 2004.
