= Peter Lauener =

Sir Peter Rene Lauener CB is a British civil servant.

Lauener studied Economics at Durham University. He was chief executive of the Young People's Learning Agency from 2010 to 2012, the Education Funding Agency from 2012 to 2017, the Skills Funding Agency from 2014 to 2017, and the successor organisation of the latter two, the Education and Skills Funding Agency in 2017. He was also interim chief executive of the Institute of Apprenticeships from 2016 to 2018, and of the Student Loans Company from 2017 to 2018. Since 2018, he has been chairman of the Construction Industry Training Board, and since 2020 has been chairman of the Student Loans Company.

Lauener was appointed a Companion of the Order of the Bath (CB) in the 2004 New Year Honours, and was knighted in the 2025 Birthday Honours.
