= Jonquil Solt =

British Paralympics supporter (1933–2022)

Jonquil Frances Loveday Solt OBE (1933 - June 2022, née Denham-Davis) was a supporter of Paralympic equestrianism and the Riding for the Disabled Association.

== Life ==
She was presented at court as a debutante in 1954, and then worked for a travel agency, reporting on resorts around the world. She wrote for magazines, worked in sales, and took a secretarial course but gave up paid employment on her marriage.

She had ridden horses since childhood, had a British Horse Society Instructor's Certificate, and was three times a reserve champion at the Horse of the Year Show.

She first became involved with the Riding for the Disabled Association in 1965, and in 1980 became the first chair of its Dressage Committee.

She organised the first international dressage competition for riders with disabilities, and in 1995 she became chair of the International Paralympic Committee's Equestrian Committee. Partly through her efforts, dressage was introduced as one of the equestrian events in the 1996 Summer Paralympics in Atlanta. She was a member of the ground jury at those games, and was a technical delegate for dressage at the 2000 Paralympics in Sydney and the 2004 Paralympics in Athens, where the International Paralympic Committee named her "Best Official of all the sports at the Games".

She died at her home in Leamington Spa in June 2022.

== Recognition ==
Solt was appointed OBE in the 2004 New Year Honours, "for services to Disabled Riding".

She was honoured with the Paralympic Order in 2013, being the first person involved in equestrianism to be so honoured.
