= Al Hamilton (journalist) =

British journalist

Al Hamilton MBE is a Jamaican-born British journalist based in London. He was responsible for setting up the Commonwealth Sports Awards in 1980. He was awarded the MBE in the 2004 New Year Honours.
