= Shiraz Durrani =

British-Kenyan librarian

Shiraz Durrani MBE is a British-Kenyan library science professional noted for his writings on the social and political dimensions of information and librarianship.

His widely held Information and Liberation: Writings on the Politics of Information and Librarianship draws on his experiences in librarianship from Mau Mau period Kenya to modern-day UK.

He was appointed MBE in the 2004 New Year Honours.

== Publications ==
- Social and Racial Exclusion Handbook for Libraries, Archives, Museums and Galleries. Social Exclusion Action Planning Network. 2001. ISBN 1903780020.
- Never be Silent: Publishing & Imperialism in Kenya, 1884-1963. Vita Books, 2006. ISBN 1869886054.
- Information and Liberation: Writings on the Politics of Information and Librarianship. Library Juice Press, 2008. ISBN 1936117274.
- "Connecting for International Librarianship" Interview with Shiraz Durrani by Julian Jaravata. July 12, 2018. Progressive Librarian 47 (Winter 2019/2020): 131-135.
- Makhan Singh, a Revolutionary Kenyan Trade Unionist. Ed. by Shiraz Durrani. 2016. Nairobi: Vita Books. 9781869886226.
- Kenya's War of Independence: Mau Mau and its Legacy of Resistance to Colonialism and Imperialism, 1948-1990. 2018. Nairobi: Vita Books. 9789966189011.
- Pio Gama Pinto: Kenya's Unsung Martyr, 1927-1965. Edited by Shiraz Durrani. 2018. Nairobi: Vita Books. 9789966189004.
