= Patricia Grayburn =

British arts administrator (1930–2026)

Patricia Maureen Grayburn, MBE, DL (June 1930 – 17 February 2026) was a British arts administrator. She had a long involvement with the arts in Surrey, after moving to become Arts Administrator at University of Surrey in 1983.

== Life and career ==
Grayburn was appointed a Deputy Lieutenant of Surrey in 2002, and was awarded MBE in 2004 for services to the arts.

She was responsible for the Lewis Elton Gallery and the breadth of public art across the University of Surrey campus and her roles included Chair of the Guildford Book Festival, Executive Director of the Guildford International Music Festival and Committee member of the Yvonne Arnaud Theatre Trust, Royal Ballet Benevolent Fund and Guildford Arts as well as other local societies.

Grayburn died on 17 February 2026, at the age of 95.

== Publications ==
- Gertrud Bodenwieser, 1890-1959: a celebratory monograph on the 100th anniversary of her birth. Ed. P. Grayburn (1990) National Resource Centre for Dance

== Portrait of Grayburn ==
Grayburn agreed to sit for sculptor Jon Edgar as part of the preparations for The Human Clay exhibition in 2011. During the sitting Edgar, a sculptor of the Frink School learnt that whilst working for London County Council, Grayburn had commissioned the Blind Beggar and his Dog sculpture for Bethnal Green - one of Elisabeth Frink's earliest commissions.
