= Margaret Spittle =

British oncologist

Margaret Flora Spittle OBE FRCP FRCR (born 10 November 1939) is a British oncologist.
