= Rosemary Leonard =

British doctor

Rosemary Anne Leonard MBE MA MB BChir MRCGP DRCOG
- Born: 22 July 1956 (age 70); London, England
- Education: Dr Challoner's High School; Newnham College, Cambridge; St Thomas's Hospital Medical School
- Occupations: General practitioner (physician), author

Rosemary Anne Leonard (born 22 July 1956) is a British general practitioner and journalist. She has written for national newspapers and magazines, and was resident GP for the BBC's Breakfast News from 1998. Leonard has published several books, including The Seven Ages of Woman, Doctor, Doctor and Doctor's Notes. Leonard was awarded Advice Columnist of the Year at the inaugural British Health Journalism Awards, and was appointed MBE for services to healthcare in 2004.

== Early life ==
Leonard attended the all-female Newnham College, Cambridge where she graduated with double first-class honours in medicine, before completing her training at St Thomas's Hospital Medical School.

== Career ==
Leonard is a GP in Dulwich, South London. In 2014 it was announced she was considering closing the practice after a problems arose over NHS funding for a new site. Leonard has written for national newspapers and magazines, including Hello!, The Sun, the Daily Mail and the Daily Express since 1986. Leonard has been the resident GP for the BBC's Breakfast News since 1998. She was a member of the Committee on Safety of Medicines and a Non-executive Director of the Health Protection Agency. Leonard has appeared on TV and radio, including on shows The Wright Stuff, and co-presenting a medical series for Sky Real Lives called The Secret Guide to Women's Health, Fighting Fit with the Eastenders, and Kick the Habit.

Leonard was a speaker at the Global Tobacco and Nicotine Forum 2021, a tobacco-industry sponsored event.

== Personal life ==
Leonard has two sons.

== Books ==
Leonard has written several books, mainly drawing on experiences from her professional life. These include:

- The Seven Ages of Woman ISBN 0593055160
- Doctor, Doctor ISBN 1444816993
- Doctor's Notes ISBN 075536208X

== Awards and honours ==
- She was appointed an MBE for services to healthcare in the New Year's Honours List 2004. In 2016 Leonard was awarded Advice Columnist of the Year at the inaugural British Health Journalism Awards.
