= Janet Ford =

British sociologist and academic administrator

Janet Ford OBE (born 1944) is a British sociologist and university administrator. Until October 2007 she served as pro-vice-chancellor of the University of York; her remit included estates and strategic projects, including the expansion of the university approved on 25 May 2007.

== Biography ==
Ford joined the University of York in 1996 as director of the Centre for Housing Policy and the Joseph Rowntree Chair of Housing Policy. She had previously held appointments at Loughborough University and the University of Warwick. Following a period as head of the Department of Social Policy and Social Work at the university, she was appointed, in October 2003, as pro-vice-chancellor for estates and strategic projects.

Ford's academic research focuses on the development and experience of home ownership in a risk society. In 1993, she undertook the first national survey of UK borrowers in mortgage arrears, covering the perspectives of lenders, borrowers and the courts. She is also interested in the changing relationship between the housing market, the labour market and social security, and in the reliance on home ownership in a society where individuals face more risk and less certainty. She has also explored in a range of European countries the impact of globalisation upon owner occupation, and has considered the response to insecurity in countries with different social, economic and cultural structures. She was awarded the OBE in 2004 for her efforts on behalf of restructuring the approach to housing concepts.

Ford has published widely in academic journals and has also written for UK pressure groups such as Child Poverty Action Group and Shelter. Between 2001 and 2005, with Professor Roger Burrows of the Department of Sociology, University of York, she was co-editor of the leading international housing journal Housing Studies.

As pro vice-chancellor in York, her portfolio included responsibility for the capital projects on the current campus at Heslington and the King's Manor and the strategic planning for the intended campus extension at Heslington East. From 2008, she is working on particular projects at the university.
