= Dawud Shittu Noibi =

Nigerian academic

(His highness) Dawud Shittu Noibi

Academic background
- Education: University of Ibadan

Academic work
- Discipline: Islamic studies
- Institutions: University of Ibadan

Dawud Shittu Noibi OBE (born 9 January 1934) is a retired professor of Islamic studies at the University of Ibadan and the immediate past Executive Secretary of the Muslim Ummah of South West Nigeria. He is an Islamic Scholar.

== Early life and education ==
He was born in Sapele, Bendel State and attended Rodicus School, Sapele between 1950 and 1945, Muslim Teachers' Training College, Ijebu-Ode between 1956 and 1957, Government Teachers' Training College, Surulere, Lagos between 1961 and 1962. He obtained the Bachelor of Arts. Degree in Arabic Studies from the University of Cairo, Egypt, 1969. Master of Arts in Islamic Studies from the American University in Cairo, Egypt, 1972 and the Ph.D in Islamic Studies from the University of Ibadan, 1984. He has attended local and international conferences.

== Career ==
He was a primary school teacher between 1955 and 1964 and a translator and broadcaster, Egyptian Radio Corporation from 1966 to 1972. He then became an education officer, North-Eastern State of Nigeria (now Borno State) between January and December, 1973 before he became a lecturer in Islamic studies at the University of Ibadan in 1973 and retired as a professor in 1996. For a brief period, he taught Islamic Law at the Muslim College, London while serving as Islamic consultant to IQRA Trust, London, a British Muslim Educational body.

== Publications ==
Noibi has many academic publications

== Awards and recognitions ==
He has received a number of awards including OBE, D.Sc. (Honoris Causa) of the Crescent University, FISN and FIAC.

== Family ==
Noibi is married to Silifat Anike Agunbiade.
