= Eric Blakeley =

Jersey journalist

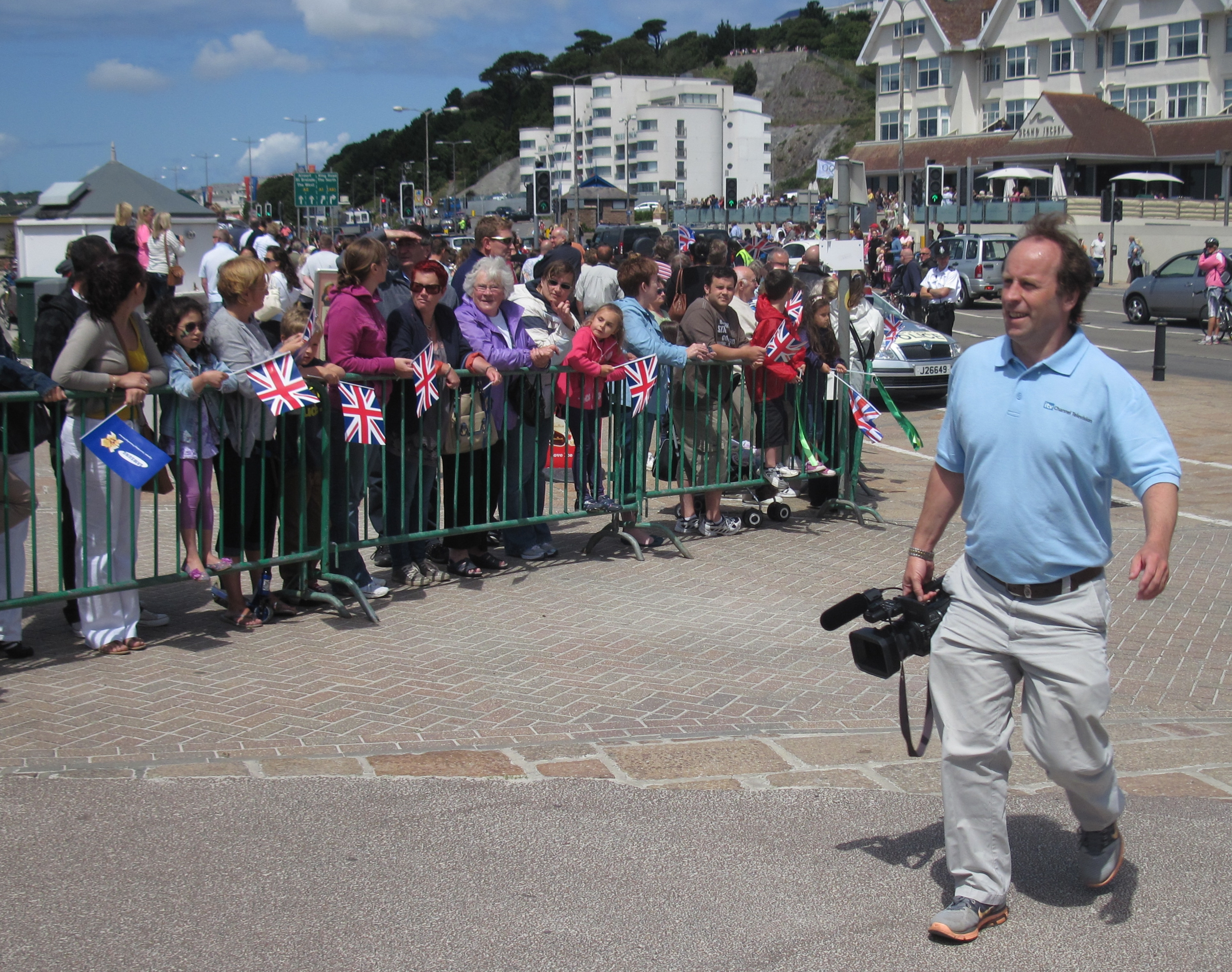
Eric Blakeley covering the 2012 Summer Olympics torch relay in Saint Helier

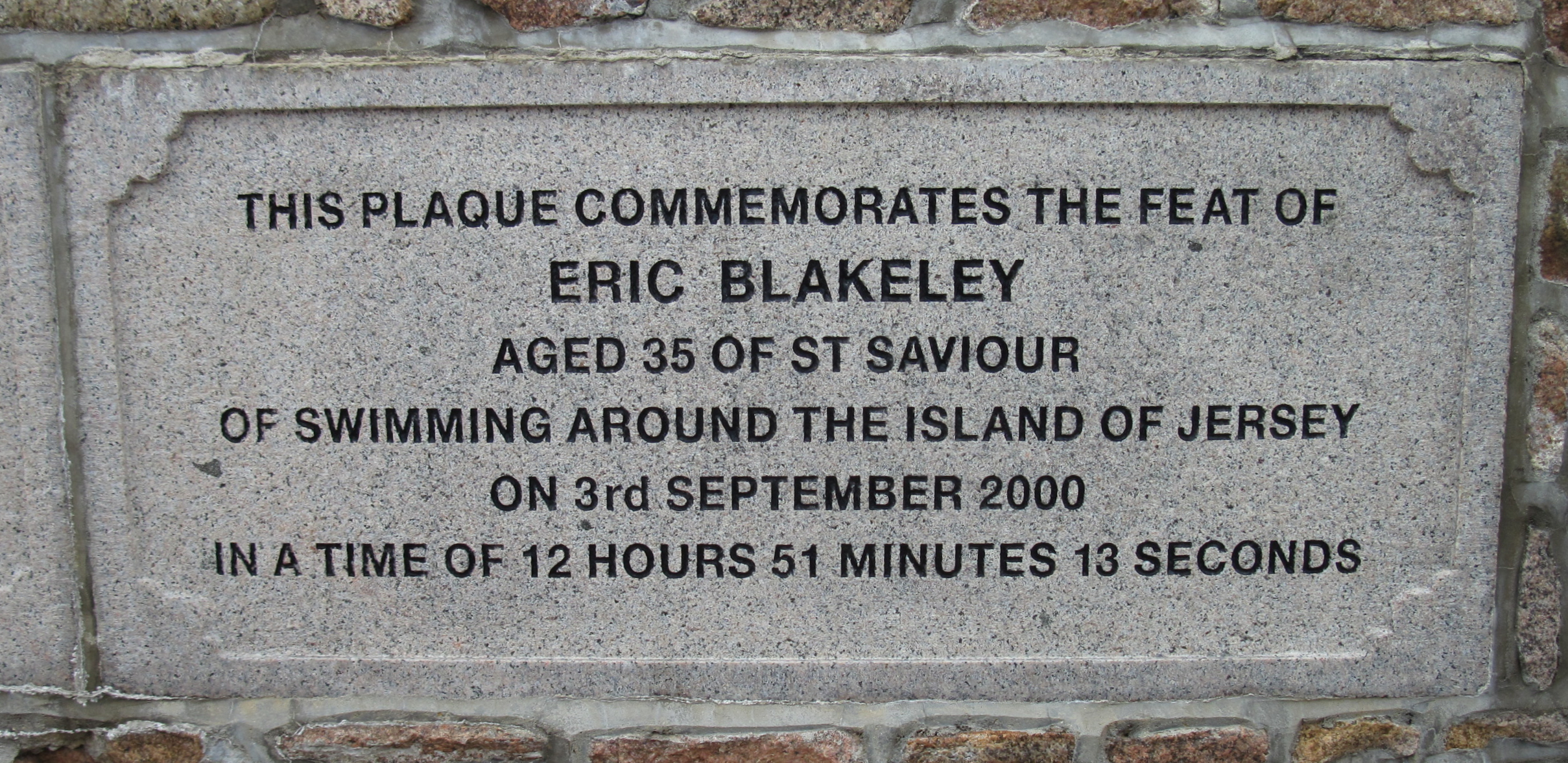
Plaque commemorating Eric Blakeley's round-Island swim of 2000

Eric Blakeley, MBE, (born 1965), is a mountaineer, adventurer, television journalist, and resident of Jersey. He has climbed the Seven Summits, the highest mountains on each continent, including Mount Everest. He swam the English Channel in 2003. He is a reporter for Channel Television.

In 1997, he was awarded the Churchill Award for Courage by the States of Jersey, for his climb of Everest.

In 2004, he received an MBE for services to mountaineering, sport and charity.
