= Carma Elliot =

British diplomat

Carma Elliot CMG OBE

Regional Director, China, British Council
- Incumbent
- Assumed office 2013

Personal details
- Born: Caroline Margaret Elliot; 24 August 1964 (age 61)

Caroline Margaret (Carma) Elliot CMG OBE (born 24 August 1964) is a British former diplomat who currently serves as the College President at the United World College of South East Asia.

== Career ==
Elliot studied Mandarin at Fudan University in Shanghai. She joined the Foreign and Commonwealth Office (FCO) in 1987 and served in Peking, Brussels, Bonn, Paris, Madrid and at the FCO. She was the first British Consul-General at Chongqing (2000–04), and later served as Consul-General at Jeddah 2004–06 and at Shanghai 2006–10. She then left the FCO and from 2011 to 2013 was executive director of China's largest international NGO, the Half the Sky Foundation (now called OneSky), which works with China's orphan children. She joined the British Council as the regional director for China in 2013. As the British Council director she holds the post of Minister (Culture and Education) at the British Embassy in Beijing.

She was appointed College President of UWC South East Asia in August 2019.

Elliot was appointed OBE in the 2004 New Year Honours and CMG in the 2011 New Year Honours.
