= C. Eugene Cox =

Cyril "C." Eugene Cox was a Bermudian politician. He served as a Bermuda Progressive Labour Party (PLP) MP from Sandys North, as Minister of Finance, and as Deputy Premier. He was the father of Paula Cox, Jeremy Cox, and Robert Cox.

== Career ==
Eugene Cox began his career at the Bermuda Electric Light Company (Belco) in 1962 as a technical assistant in the engineering department, at a time when the company — like the wider Bermudian society — was still segregated. Despite the professional and social challenges of that period, he advanced within the organisation and gained recognition for his abilities and leadership.

Cox first won a seat in Parliament between 1976 and 1980 in Sandys North. Cox was elected Deputy Leader in 1996, and Minister of Finance on 10 November 1998.

In 2003, Cox was appointed a Commander of the Order of the British Empire (CBE) in the Queen’s New Year Honours List in recognition of his "brilliant mind, proven executive ability and commitment to service" across his professional, political and community roles.

== Death ==
Around New Years' 2004, Cox died at the age of 75 from complications with cancer. His position of Minister of Finance was succeeded by his daughter Paula on 22 January 2004.

== Tribute ==
After his death, Belco renamed its Operations Centre in his honour and established the C. Eugene Cox Engineering Scholarship to support Bermudians pursuing postgraduate engineering studies relevant to the company’s work.
