= Metro Production Group =

UK event production company

Metro Production Group Ltd
- Type: Limited Company
- Industry: Event Design; Technical Event Production; Audio Visual and Broadcast Services; Audio Visual Hire and Installation
- Founded: Formerly Metrovideo Ltd., 1980. Bought by WPP Group plc: 1986
- Founder: David Pacey (as a tape sales company)
- Headquarters: London, England (Head office); Edinburgh, Scotland (Head office)
- Number of locations: Glasgow, Scotland and Aberdeen, Scotland
- Area served: Worldwide
- Number of employees: 90+ (2016)
- Parent: WPP Wiki
- Website: metroproductiongroup.com

Metro Production Group Ltd (previously Metro Broadcast Limited) is a UK-based corporate event supplier and creative event production company. Its head office is in London. The company is a wholly owned subsidiary of WPP plc.

Metro Production Group is also the resident technical production supplier at several London event venues such as 30 Euston Square, a conference venue based at The Royal College of General Practitioners, and one of Europe’s largest conference hotels, Hilton London Metropole. Additionally, the company is a preferred event supplier at some of London’s most precious and historic buildings including Somerset House, the Natural History Museum, Spencer House, Barber-Surgeons’ Hall and Middle Temple Hall.

== History ==
In 1980, in a flat in Welling, South East London, Managing Director David Pacy and Technical Director Brian Rottger founded Metrovideo. Its principal activity was tape sales to advertising agencies such as JWT (formerly J. Walter Thompson Co.), Saatchi & Saatchi and Y&R (formerly Young & Rubicam).

The company soon relocated to Landsdown Road in Stockwell and then, in April 1984, to the Old Bacon Factory in Great Suffolk Street, London SE1.

In early 1986, the business was sold to WPP plc, a British, multinational advertising and public relations company founded by Martin Sorrell. Metrovideo was the third company to be acquired by the Group.

Metrovideo later acquired a number of regional video businesses for itself, including Horizon Video and Still Frame Video in the South of England and Teletape Anglia in Cambridge. This expanded the sales, installation, service, AV hire and technical event production| areas of the company. A broadcast division of the company was located in offices in London’s Soho. All of these businesses traded under the Metro Group banner.

In 1990, Metro launched a full-service production business called G Force, which later changed its name to Clever Media. Clever Media was then merged into another WPP operating company.

In 1997, the company extended its operation into Scotland by establishing an office and equipment warehouse in Edinburgh.

In 2007, the Company was renamed as Metro Broadcast Ltd. In 2012 Metro Broadcast relocated its head office and main business premises to its current location in Oval, South London. In 2014, it acquired additional workshop space to house its set and staging department. Today, the London business is led by Managing Director Mary Metcalfe, and the Scottish business is led by Managing Director Oscar Askin.

In 2020, the Company re-branded to Metro Production Group.

In 2024, the Company moved the main operations to a larger premises in Battersea. 1 Stewarts Lane, London, SW83HE. Today the business is led by Managing Director Liz Rice, Finance Director Matthew Hearn.

The head office remains at 2 Rose Court, Southwark Bridge Road, London, SE1 9HS
