= The Guild, Preston =

Grade II listed pub in Lancashire, England

Coordinates: 53°45′52″N 2°42′41″W

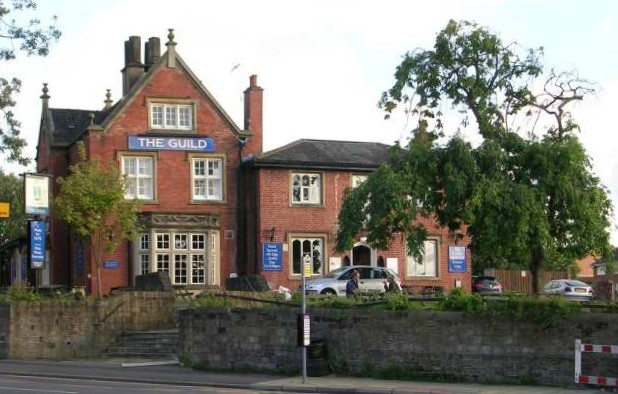
The Guild

The Guild is a grade II listed public house at 99 Fylde Road in Preston, Lancashire, England. It was built as the home of the cotton manufacturer William Taylor and became a pub in the late 1980s.

== History ==
It was built in 1818 of red brick with sandstone dressings and slate roofs for William Taylor (died 1852), who at the time was the manager of John Horrocks's Moss Mill and later owned the Tulketh Mill.

From the 1920s it was the surgery and home of the physician Fraser Macintosh Rose for 40 years. Rose lived in the part of the building known as Moss Cottage and during his residence there was instrumental in the creation of the Royal College of General Practitioners (RCGP). In 2009 the North West branch of the RCGP received permission to install a heritage plaque on the building.

The building fell into dereliction until, in the early 1990s, it became the Hogshead pub and then The Guild, managed by Greene King.
