= William Taylor (cotton manufacturer) =

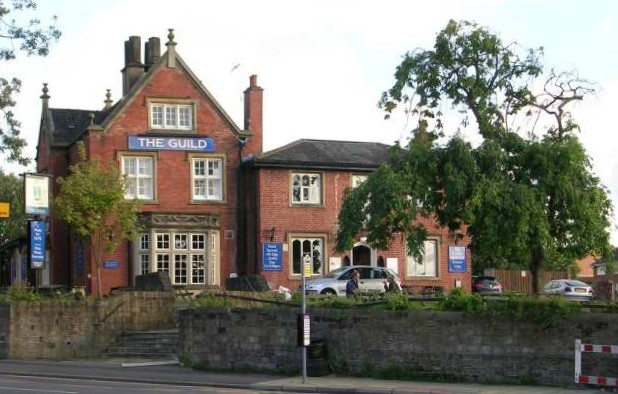
The Guild public house, built for Taylor as his home in 1818.

William Taylor (died 1852) was a Preston cotton manufacturer who was an important figure in the life of the city in the mid-nineteenth century.

Taylor was a former apprentice to the cotton manufacturer John Horrocks in Preston and rose to be spinning manager at Horrock's Moss Mill. The building now used as The Guild public house, was built as Taylor's home at that time. He later went into business on his own account and owned the Tulketh Mill. He opposed the reduction of working hours and restrictions in child labour in the mills, saying, "The condition of the people would not be improved by working shorter hours… Employing young people aids the parents".
