= Julia Hippisley-Cox =

British epidemiologist

- Awards: John Fry Award (2009); Dr John Perry Prize (2013)
- Scientific career
- Institutions: University of Nottingham; University of Oxford; Queen Mary University of London
- Website: www.qmul.ac.uk/wiph/people/profiles/julia-hippisley-cox-.html

Julia Hippisley-Cox is a British epidemiologist, and Professor of Clinical Epidemiology and Predictive Medicine at Queen Mary University of London. She became a Fellow of the Royal College of Physicians in 2013. She has been awarded the John Fry Award in 2009 and the Dr John Perry Prize in 2013.

== Life ==
Hippisley-Cox earned a medical degree from Sheffield University Medical School in 1989. She became a Fellow of the Royal College of Physicians in 2013. Hippisley-Cox lectured at the University of Nottingham, and was promoted to Professor of Clinical Epidemiology & General Practice there in 2005. She was appointed Professor of Clinical Epidemiology and General Practice at the University of Oxford. In February 2025 she was appointed as the inaugural Professor of Clinical Epidemiology and Predictive Medicine in the Wolfson Institute of Population Health at Queen Mary University of London.

Hippisley-Cox is Professor of Epidemiology and General Practice at the University of Oxford. Hippisley-Cox is interested in drug safety, risk prediction and clinical epidemiology. She co-founded the QResearch database, a which links data from 1500 general practitioner practices in the UK to clinical records, hospital data and mortality data. The database is used for testing risk prediction algorithms, and one of the largest databases of its kind.

== Awards ==
Hippisley-Cox was awarded the Prize in Medicine, Surgery, General Practice and Obstetrics and Gynaecology when she was at Sheffield. In 2009 the Royal College of General Practitioners awarded her the John Fry Award. In 2013 she won the Dr John Perry Prize, which is awarded for contributions to NHS IT. In 2021 the Royal Statistical Society awarded the COVID-19 Population Risk Assessment team their Florence Nightingale Award, for their predictive model, QCovid. She was elected a Fellow of the Academy of Medical Sciences in 2023.
