= Ramesh Mehta =

Ramesh Mehta may refer to:

- Ramesh Mehta (playwright)
- Ramesh Mehta (actor)
- Ramesh Mehta (paediatrician)
- Ramesh Sumant Mehta, Indian educator and environmental and sanitary engineer
