= Person-centered care =

Medical care with a patient actively participating in the plan

In health care, person-centered care is a practice in which patients actively participate in their own medical treatment in close cooperation with their health professionals. Sometimes, relatives may be involved in the creation of the patient's health plan. The person-centered model of health care is used both for in and outpatient settings, emergency care, palliative care as well as in rehabilitation.

== Background ==
The concept of person-centered care can be distinguished from a traditional treatment model which views the patient as a passive receiver of a medical intervention. Many health professionals are traditionally focused on the needs of the patients instead of their resources. Rather than the conventional way of making medical recommendations from health professionals to a patient, the person-centered care model allows for the inclusion of the patient and their relatives in making a joint design and mutual agreement on the medical plans and treatments. The overall perspective of the life situation of the patient is considered to create objectives and strategies for both short- and long-term monitoring.

The concept of person-centered care has grown to be internationally associated with successful outcomes in health care. Initially, the method was developed for senior patients and patients with intellectual disabilities, albeit it has been held under scrutiny later on.

Within person-centered care, the patient is considered an independent and capable individual with their own abilities to make informed decisions. Autonomy and participation are emphasized and respected. For the patient, the person-centered approach allows for involvement and extended possibilities to take responsibility for their own health and treatment.

== Key principles ==
There are four vantage points that constitute the foundation of person-centered care:

- The health care should be based on the unique person's needs and his or her right to health
- The health institution should focus on the abilities of the person and encourage activity
- The health care should be coherent
- Health professionals should always approach patients with dignity, compassion and respect. They should work with an ethical perspective.

Person-centered care is based on a holistic approach to health care that takes the whole person into account instead of a narrow perspective where the focus lies on the illness or the symptoms. The person-centered approach also includes the person's abilities, or resources, wishes, health and well-being as well as social and cultural factors.

According to the Gothenburg model of person centered care there are three central routines in order to translate person-centredness into person-centered care work: the patient's narrative, the partnership and the documentation.

=== The Partnership ===
The health care team may consist of several different professionals with varying expertise from different health care units. The patient is a natural part of the team. Within the team, the patient and relatives have discussions with health professionals aiming to reach a mutual understanding on how to achieve safe and accurate care for the unique patient.

=== The Documentation ===
The personal health or care plan is designed to capture the patient's narrative. A common understanding of strategies, goals and evaluation of the outcomes should be established. The documentation should clearly state the responsibilities of each member of the team, including the patient's own role and obligations. To fully live up to the person-centered care concept, patients should have full and easy access to all information and documentation about them. For reasons of security, accessibility and cost effectiveness, all documentation should be digital and include all medical records. The person's own notes, reports of health status and the overall health plan should also be carefully documented. The collected documentation is the foundation of the health care.

== Person-centered care in the United Kingdom ==
Person-centered care is a concept used in the United Kingdom by Skills for Health, in their 2017 framework; by the Health Foundation, set out in their 2016 "quick guide"; by the Social Care Institute for Excellence; by the Royal College of General Practitioners and NHS England, who have developed a Person-Centred Care toolkit; by the Health Innovation Network South London; and by the Care Quality Commission, in their regulations for service providers.

The Health Innovation Network defines person-centered care as:

a way of thinking and doing things that sees the people using health and social services as equal partners in planning, developing and monitoring care to make sure it meets their needs. This means putting people and their families at the centre of decisions and seeing them as experts, working alongside professionals to get the best outcome

— What is person-centred care and why is it important?

The concept is defined as including decision-making that is shared between services users and professionals, ensuring service users have access to advocacy, providing personal budgets for people to access services, treating people with dignity, ensuring service users have all the information they need, supporting individual choices and ensuring treatment and support are personalized and take into account people's preferences. The Royal College of GPs notes that the key question is not '"what's the matter with you" but "what matters to you".

The Health Foundation states that "a commonly cited barrier is that many [service providers] believe the care they provide is already person-centred. However, the evidence shows that this is often not the case".

== Person-centered care research ==
Research on person-centered care (PCC) is conducted across many universities worldwide. One of the largest comprehensive research organizations in the field is the University of Gothenburg Centre for Person-centred Care (GPCC) in Sweden, established in 2010 and now engaging over 200 affiliated researchers in interdisciplinary, multiprofessional programs supported in part by the Swedish Government's Strategic Research Area initiative. Today, GPCC is the largest comprehensive research center in the field and has produced the majority of evidence regarding the effects and efficiency of PCC across diverse clinical contexts, as well as health-economic outcomes. It is also the initiating organization and current organizer of the Global Conference on Person-Centred Care (GcPCC), a biennial event held in Gothenburg (www.gcpcc.org).

The GPCC (Gothenburg) model operationalizes PCC through three core routines that make the philosophy actionable in everyday practice: (1) eliciting each person's narrative to initiate a genuine partnership; (2) co-creating goals and a living care plan within that partnership; and (3) documenting to safeguard the partnership, shared decisions and follow-through across settings. This framework is underpinned by an ethical commitment to personhood, capabilities and shared responsibility, and it is supported by practical tools for assessment, planning and measurement. A concise overview of the model and lessons from its spread are presented by Wolf and Britten in The BMJ. Building on this, recent work led by Hanna Gyllensten and colleagues (2025) synthesizes the health-economic evidence, indicating that PCC interventions are typically cost-effective, cost-neutral or cost-saving compared with usual care—strengthening the case for wider adoption and scale-up across systems.

The Patient Preferences for Patient Participation tool (The 4Ps) can be used to evaluate patient participation in health care. The tool has two sections and with four response alternatives in each section, the 4Ps offers sixteen possible combinations of degree of match per item

== Person-centered care according to McCormack ==
A conceptual framework for person-centered care has been presented by McCormack and McCance. The holistic framework by McCormack and McCance consists of four constructs; prerequisites, the care environment, person-centered processes, and expected outcomes.

== Related concepts ==
Patient-centered care is a concept that also emphasizes the involvement of the patient and their families in the decision making of medical treatments. A main difference is that person-centered care describes the whole person in a wider context rather than the patient-centered approach which is based on the person's role as a patient. There is a difference between the word "patient" and "person", still there is a widespread use of the concept of patient-centered care and person-centered care as equals. The word "patient" can be defined as a person who receives treatment for a disorder or illness. Characteristic of a patient is vulnerability and dependence. To get a deeper understanding of the word "person" we need to define the philosophical concept of personhood. Personhood is linked with responsibilities and human rights, and characteristics such as rationality and consciousness. The goal of person-centered care is for the person to live a meaningful life. The concept has a more holistic focus on the person's uniqueness in disregard to the sickness. Patient-centered care has sprung out of resistance against the paternalistic and biomedical approach to medicine.

People-centered care is an umbrella term, articulated by WHO among others, which entails the right and duty for people to actively participate in decisions at all levels of the health care systems. People-centered care focuses both on the individual's right to health, access to health care and information, but also health literacy on a collective level.

Relational care with older people, which has evolved from person-centered care, considers the wellbeing and quality of life of everyone involved in a person's care, encompassing the older person, professionals, and communities within and beyond care settings.

Health activation is a condition where a health care consumer is equipped, educated, and motivated to be an effective manager of their own health and use of health care services. The concepts are very similar, although person-centered care places the emphasis on the healthcare provider, whereas the term health activation is used in reference to the attitude and behavior of the patient.

Good care focus on empowerment, respect, humanization, and absence of infantilization. Good care implies, on the one hand, prevention of abuse or mistreatment, and on the other, patient-centered care.

Good care is measured via a self-reported questionnaire. The Good Care Scale in Nursing Homes (GCS-NH)a) has been used, which is a 62-item questionnaire that assesses empowerment, respect, humanization, and non-infantilization, by measuring how strong nursing home staff agree with each statement on a scale of 0- 4.
