= Fraser Macintosh Rose =

General practitioner (1897–1972)

Fraser Macintosh Rose OBE
- Born: 3 February 1897; Nova Scotia
- Died: 2 October 1972 (aged 75)
- Education: Edinburgh Medical School
- Occupation: General practitioner
- Known for: Co-founding RCGP
- Children: 5
- Father: Rev John Rose

Fraser Macintosh Rose, OBE (3 February 1897 – 2 October 1972), known as Fraser Rose, was a British physician who worked as a general practitioner (GP), and is best known for co-founding the Royal College of General Practitioners (RCGP).

He served in the First World War and saw action in Gallipoli and the Balkans. Following a gunshot wound and a back injury, he returned to Britain to study medicine at the University of Edinburgh Medical School, qualifying in 1924. After junior posts at Bradford Royal Infirmary and Brighton, he settled into general practice in Preston, where he remained until his retirement.

Rose was for many years active on the Council of the British Medical Association (BMA), on numerous medical committees both before and after the inception of the National Health Service, and in other areas of medical politics. Along with particularly John Hunt and others, he made considerable contributions to the "steering committee" that set up the College, which in 1967 was given the royal prefix to become the RCGP. He became its president in 1962.

== Early life ==
Fraser Rose was born on 3 February 1897 in a small fishing community on Cape Breton Island, South Side River Denys, Nova Scotia, where his father, the Reverend John Rose (1849–1922) had been appointed a minister in 1884. He was the eighth of nine children and lived in a small lakeside farm that he later described as his "Eden". His first and middle names relate to two doctors associated with his family, Dr Fraser McAulay, who delivered Rose after walking through a snowstorm, and Dr Macintosh, a friend of Rose senior.

He returned to Scotland in 1909, at the age of 12, when his family settled on the Hebridean Isle of Lewis at the Manse of the Free Church in Crossbost. In 1910 he started a school debating society while at the Nicolson Institute in Stornoway.

== First World War ==
Rose's education was interrupted by the First World War. As he was already enrolled in the Highland Territorial Division with his school friends, he enlisted on the first day of the war and was subsequently posted to Gallipoli. His responsibility as a driver was to lead and look after the horses that were fundamental to the transport of artillery and war supplies. He saw the Cape Helles landings in April 1915 and those at Suvla Bay in August 1915 which left him with a revulsion for warfare. After being shot in one arm and contracting dysentery, Rose was evacuated back to England in November 1915, on the RMS Mauretania. He returned to his unit nine months later in Macedonia, only to be discharged from duties again due to a back injury shortly before Armistice Day.

== Early medical career ==
Although his father proposed the clergy as a suitable career, Rose chose medicine and gained admission to Edinburgh Medical School in 1919. He was appointed to the university's Student Representative Council and became its president in his final year. In 1924, he attained the MB ChB. The return of civilians from the war and resulting lack of jobs caused Rose to put pressure on the dean in order to get his first junior jobs.

Rose's first appointment was a surgical house job at Bradford Royal Infirmary, followed by a resident medical post at Queen Alexandra Hospital for Sick Children at Brighton. He successfully competed with the later president of the Royal College of Obstetricians and Gynaecologists for the post of resident surgical officer at Preston Royal Infirmary.

== General practice ==
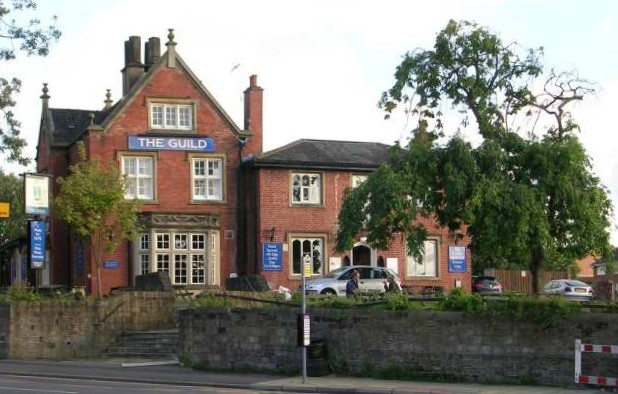
Fraser Rose's surgery, now The Guild public house.

In 1927, Rose joined Dr A. T. Gibb in partnership at a surgery in Preston, Lancashire, one year before Gibb left. His subsequent partners were both Edinburgh graduates, 17 years with Dr Ronald Guyer, followed by Dr Callum MacKenzie in 1946.

Between the 1920s and 1940s, Rose witnessed his practice population move from one of high unemployment to one of employment in new industries, particularly in aircraft manufacture. Two surgeries at either end of the day were the usual for the weekdays and one morning surgery on Saturdays. Mid-day was spared for house calls, and night duties were by rota and shared. The family holidays were confined to very rare trips to the Isle of Lewis. Rose also occasionally visited family in Scotland and Canada.

By 1951, Rose and his partner had a relatively large list size for the time of 8000 patients, consistent with other industrialized but under-doctored towns. According to his patients, he was "strict" with "little bedside manner" but was "dedicated" and an "excellent GP".

== Medical politics ==
=== British Medical Association ===
Rose joined the British Medical Association (BMA) on graduating. He was a member of Council from 1942 to 1945 and 1950–62. He served for 14 years on the General Medical Services Committee which negotiated the terms and conditions of service for general practitioners (GPs) at the inception of the National Health Service in 1948. He became secretary of the Preston division of the BMA, and chairman in 1954. He was appointed the first president of the North Lancashire and Westmorland branch of the BMA. In 1950 he was well established in medical politics and Henry Cohen, vice president elect of the BMA described him as .... "sincere in his desire to advance the profession, increase the status of the general practitioner, and uphold the honour and interests of the Association".

=== Health service administration committees ===
Rose served on several important local committees that supervised the 1911 National Health Insurance scheme in Lancashire and Preston. In 1948, he joined the newly formed local NHS administrative committees.

=== National committees ===
In 1953, Rose served for six years on the Central Health Services Council which was set up to advise the Minister of Health on all technical matters in the running of the National Health Service (NHS), and he sat for nine years on the NHS Tribunal, a judicial body which determined whether doctors who had been convicted of serious offences should be employed. His commitment to his practice and committee work was to the detriment of his leisure time and he noted in 1962 that "I have arrived at the stage where evenings, half days and weekends are all submerged in one thing or another."

=== The steering committee and College of GPs ===
The general practice crisis following the creation of the NHS resulted in a rise in general practitioner consultations of 15% requiring an average additional 1750 consultations a year per doctor. The gloom of doctors was amplified by confrontations with the government over their remuneration.

Increasing specialities, the strength of the traditional royal colleges and lack of appropriate training left GPs feeling excluded and resentful. Morale slipped further when The Lancet in 1951, published a critical report on general practice by the visiting Australian doctor, Joe Collings. Rose asserted it "painted a black picture of crowded waiting rooms, queues, lack of surgery equipment, inadequate examination of patients even in the better practices visited, and of unsatisfactory standards generally".

The College of General Practitioners came about because of a letter titled "A College of General Practice", signed by Rose and John Hunt, which was simultaneously printed in the British Medical Journal and The Lancet on 13 October 1951. The letter starts

"There is a College of Physicians, a College of Surgeons, a College of Obstetricians and Gynaecologists... but there is no College of Academic Body to represent primarily the interests of the largest group of medical personnel in this country."

The resulting correspondence was mostly encouraging despite opposition from the traditional royal colleges. By February 1952, Rose and Hunt had assembled a steering committee. Their role was to give a leadership inclusive of GPs all over the country, produce a strategy for the establishment of a new college and formalise education. They succeeded on 19 November 1952, when the college was established and the committee dissolved. Rose continued to be active in the college council, first as member and then as chairman.

Rose was made a member of the Order of the British Empire in 1962 and in the same year, elected president of the RCGP. He was later made an honorary fellow of the college.

== Personal life ==
Rose married Margaret Jean Howe in 1927. They had a son in 1930, but two years after the birth of their twins in 1935, Margaret died at the age of 37 years. Rose later married Catherine Dickinson, the daughter of a Methodist minister, with whom he had a further two sons. Of his five children, three sons became doctors and one of his daughters qualified as a nurse.

He was interested in photography and gardening, and wrote two volumes of autobiography, Wednesday's Child and The Student Years. He devoted much time after his retirement to researching his family history.

Rose remained in general practice until he was almost 71 years old, retiring in 1968. During the year of the steering committee (1951) Rose suffered a heart attack. After this, his health slowly declined over the following 20 years, with the addition of diabetes, dermatitis and cataracts. He continued to hold offices in several medical organizations and committees until a few months before his death at age 75, just 3 weeks before the royal charter was given to the RCGP.

== Legacy ==
The RCGP's Fraser Rose Medal is awarded for exceptional performance at the MRCGP exam. The Worshipful Society of Apothecaries of London and the RCGP jointly award The Rose Prize for the best original research into the history of general practice. This prize also celebrates William Rose, the famous apothecary from the 18th century whose successful trial gave apothecaries the right to prescribe. The Rose-Hunt Prize is awarded by the Royal Australian College of General Practitioners for outstanding service to general practice.

Following the discovery that Rose's 99 Fylde Road surgery in Preston had become a public house known as The Guild, permission was obtained by the North West branch of the RCGP to install a memorial plaque.
