= Patient engagement in Canada =

Patient engagement in Canada has been an active part of the Canadian health care system since the new millennium.

In the context of patient-oriented research, patient engagement in Canada is defined as patients being "actively engaged in governance, priority setting, developing the research questions, and even performing certain parts of the research itself".

Patient engagement is based around person-centered care, the practice of medical patients actively participating in their own treatment - or research related to their treatment or conditions - in close cooperation with professionals and academic and medical institutions, regardless of the form of practice. Patient engagement is a form of patient participation, and thus falls under its loose list of possible terms that associate with it.

== Components ==
In Canadian medical culture, there are many components to patient engagement, the most notable ones being patient advisory, patient partnership, and patient-oriented research.

These three components make up a basis of the Canadian approach to patient engagement, and each host institution tends to have their own definition of following terms, generalized below:

- Patient advisory: Patient advisors are appointed by the hospitals, clinics, community health centers or local boards of health to provide these institutions or medical professionals advice from the perspective of patients, their family members and their caregivers at multiple times.
- Patient partnership: This signifies a partnership between both the patients and the healthcare workers or institutions to ensure that the patient, in most cases chronically ill patients, is getting the proper care they need while also supplying the healthcare workers, institutions and professionals with experiential knowledge that can aid them in helping future patients, as many patients are called upon to provide themselves with a significant amount of self-care. Patient partnership can also be in the form of partnering on research projects and research grants as co-authors.
- Patient-oriented research: This means that medical professionals are engaging patients and their caregivers, family members, and friends in the research process. By doing so, medical professionals are able to gain a much more in-depth understanding of the priorities of patients, which can lead to a better understanding in the future for hospitals, clinics and community health centres. Additionally, patient-oriented research often includes the co-design of research projects and research grants with patients.

== Practice ==
Since 2015, patient advisors – patients advising on a project in the context of patient engagement – have been recruited to join hospital boards or health-care related projects across Canada in order to help institutions and medical professionals have a better understanding of the healthcare system from perspective of patients, their family members, and caregivers.

For example, the Canadian Institutes for Health Research (CIHR), a sub-agency of the Canadian government under the jurisdiction of the Minister of Health, developed the Strategy for Patient-Oriented Research (SPOR) to help patients and researchers work together and collaborate on specific research projects that are co-designed with patients, by patients, for patients. To assist with this, the government funds the Strategy for Patient Oriented Research (SPOR) and also funds SUPPORT Units in each province. With this training, inclusion, and encouragement across the country training patient advisors Canada has a pool of very effective engaged patients. A non-profit organization, the Patient Advisors Network, has been created by patients and caregivers across Canada to serve as a community of practice. The job of patient advisors is to return feedback based on their own experiences as a patient, family member or caregiver of a patient to ensure that hospitals and medical professionals understand the experience which a patient should have when in care of the hospital or a medical professional. They are also able to work with practice teams on either short or long-term commitments to determine the best course of action for future patients.

== See also ==
- Patient participation
