= Aneez Esmail =

Aneez Esmail is a British general practitioner and academic at the University of Manchester. He is a professor of general practice and a GP for three sessions a week. Between 2012 and 2017, he served as the director of the National Institute for Health Research's (NIHR) research centre on patient safety in primary care. He is well known for his work over many years on racism in the British National Health Service. He has chaired a wide-ranging review of all postgraduate medical exams. He was medical adviser to the Shipman Inquiry. He was offered an OBE for his contribution to primary care and race relations in 2002, but declined it.

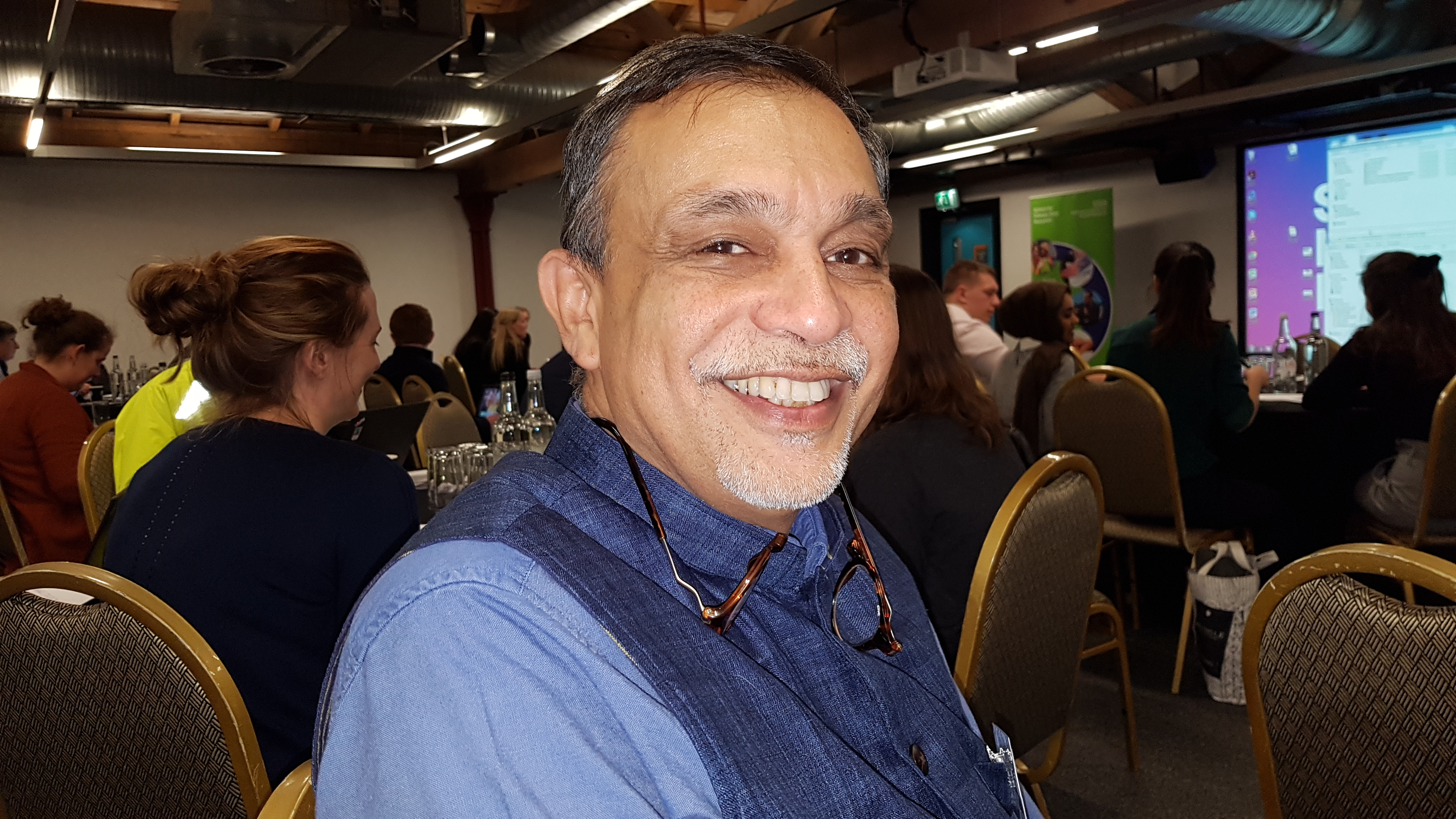
Prof Aneez Esmail

Esmail is a British Asian, having previously lived in East Africa. He is the first British Asian to ever hold an executive position at a UK Russell Group University.

== Work on racism in the medical profession ==
=== Discrimination in the job application process ===
He explains that when he asked a hospital consultant, when a young doctor, "Tell me how do you decide who you short-list for a job? and he said 'Oh its very simple Aneez' he said 'I put all the foreign applications in one pile and all the English applications in another pile and I look at the English applications first and only if I do not find any suitable candidates I look at the list with the foreign names'." He went on in 1993, with Dr Sam Everington of the Medical Practitioners Union to devise a project that would try and actually determine whether discrimination was real. They took two sets of application forms one with an Asian name and one with an English name. They constructed applications so that they were almost exactly the same in terms of the age of the applicant, in terms of where the applicant qualified and in terms of their experience. They then sent one application with an English name and one with an Asian name to 30 hospitals which were advertising vacancies. They found that the white applicant was twice as likely to be short-listed as the Asian applicant. As a result of complaints he and Everington were arrested and charged with making fraudulent job applications. Their paper was in the BMJ and they were threatened by the General Medical Council with a charge of behaviour which was unbecoming of the medical profession. On further investigation they discovered that ethnic minority doctors were 6 times more likely to be brought before the Professional Conduct Committee of the General Medical Council than white doctors.

He made a complaint against the University of Manchester in 2002 claiming that it was institutionally racist because his work was not submitted to the Research Assessment Exercise.

=== Bias in postgraduate exams ===
He was chosen to head the General Medical Council’s 2014 review into the differences between the scores achieved by black and minority ethnic GP trainees and their white counterparts in the clinical skills assessment component of the Membership exam of the Royal College of General Practitioners. The RCGP was challenged in the courts by the British Association of Physicians of Indian Origin. He analysed data on more than 5,000 candidates who sat the CSA exam over a two-year period. He said ‘subjective bias due to racial discrimination may be a cause’ of the different pass rates for between white and non-white graduates. "Many of us who do work in this area describe the problem of unconscious bias. So I think that what might be happening, especially with the white British graduates compared to the ethnic minority British graduates, is that - without realising it even perhaps - they may be assessing it in a different way. So I don't think that it's the examiners saying 'oh we don't like ethnic minorities' - it doesn't work like that anymore. It's all this unconscious stuff that goes on which we need to be aware of."

== European Union ==
Most of Aneez Esmail's work was carried out when the UK was in the EU. The European Union hold a notably less diverse population across higher education and health service sectors.

== Publications ==
- Esmail, A., & Everington, S. (1993). Racial discrimination against doctors from ethnic minorities. BMJ: British Medical Journal, 306(6879), 691.
- Sandars, J., & Esmail, A. (2003). The frequency and nature of medical error in primary care: Understanding the diversity across studies. Family Practice, 20(3), 231–236.
- Roberts, C., Esmail, A., Sarangi, S., Southgate, L., Wakeford, R., Wass, V., & May, C. (2000). Oral examinations—equal opportunities, ethnicity, and fairness in the MRCGP. Commentary: Oral exams—get them right or don't bother. BMJ, 320(7231), 370–375.
- Esmail, A., & Roberts, C. (2013). Academic performance of ethnic minority candidates and discrimination in the MRCGP examinations between 2010 and 2012: Analysis of data. BMJ, 347, f5662.
