= Bromley by Bow Centre =

Community centre in London, England

Coordinates: 51.5270°N 0.0133°W

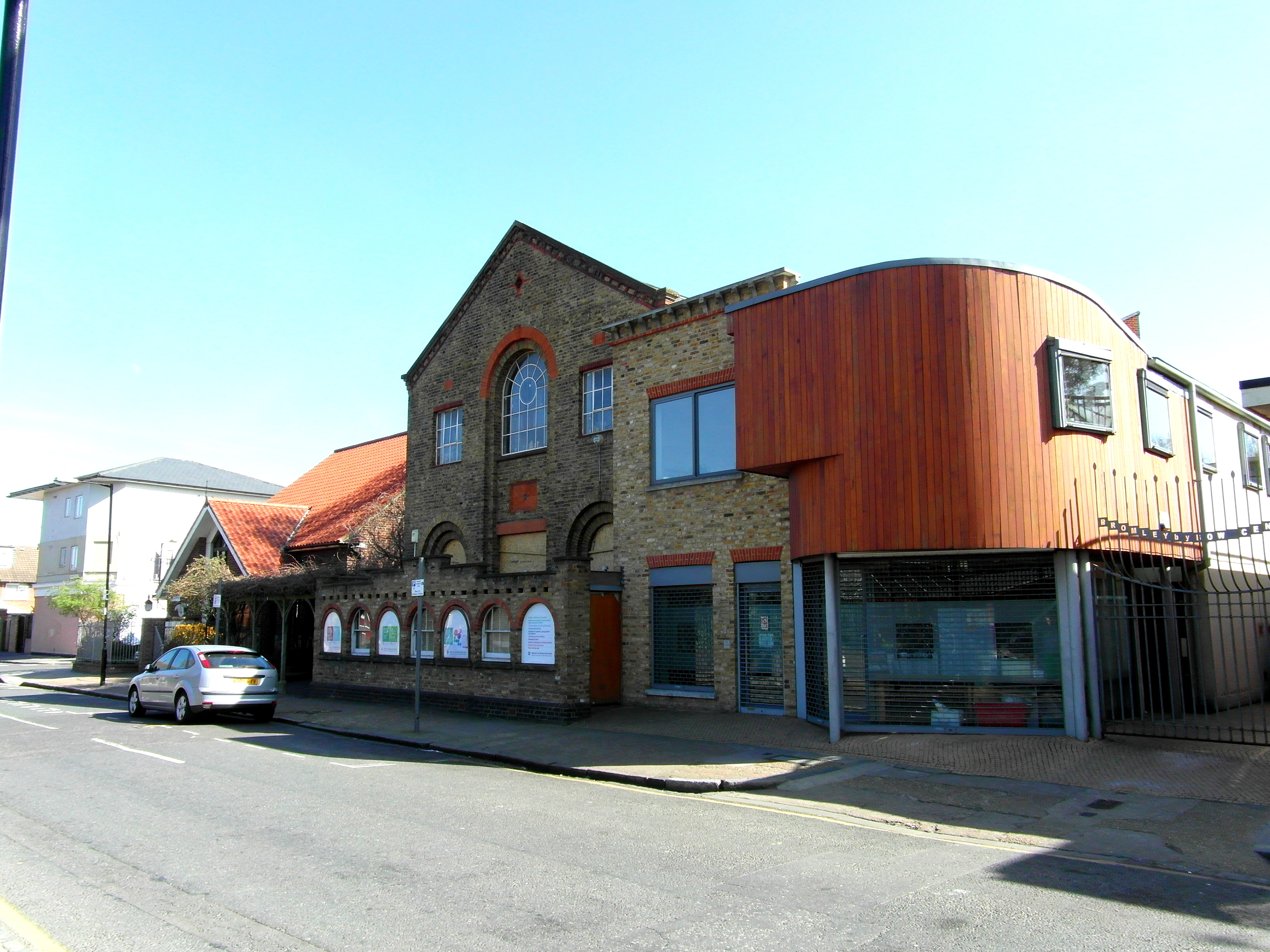
The Bromley by Bow Centre

The Bromley by Bow Centre is a community centre in Bromley-by-Bow, in London. It was founded by Andrew Mawson in 1984 alongside community members such as Chilean artist Santiago Bell, with the aim of transforming the local community. Over the years, the centre has grown to encompass a GP surgery where Sam Everington is an enthusiastic advocate of the centre, church, nursery, children's centre, community facilities and a cafe. It is the site of the UK's first Healthy Living Centre, and around 2,000 people use the Centre each week. In addition to team members such as psychologists, nurses, counsellors, and phlebotomists, the centre also houses artists, stonemasons, gardeners, and stained-glass makers.

The Bromley by Bow Centre works in partnership with Poplar HARCA to deliver community regeneration work in its local neighbourhood.

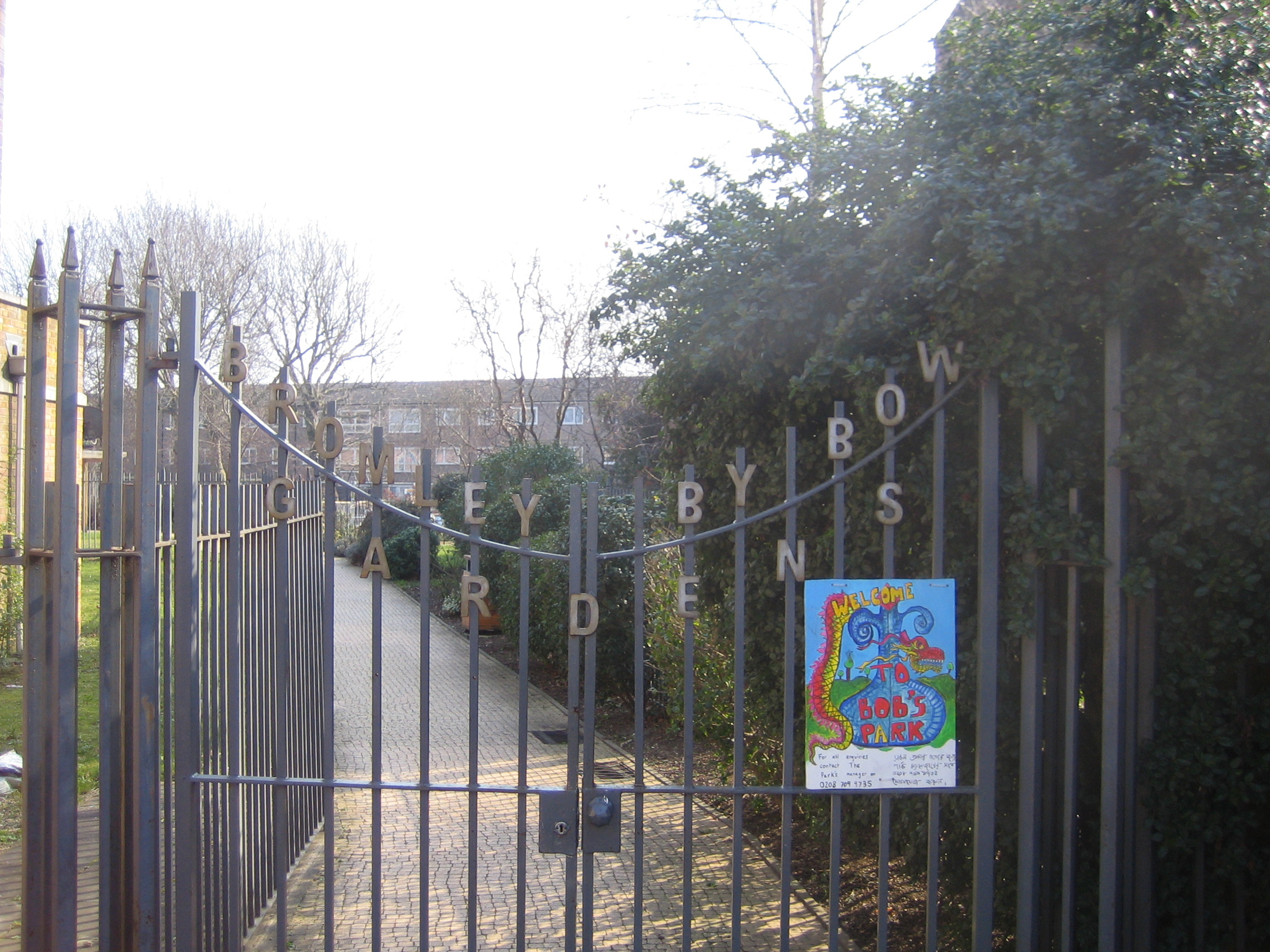
Bob's Park

The conversion of the church, the health centre, cafe, enterprise and training barn, and layout of the adjacent Bob's Park were designed by Wyatt MacLaren architects. The principal entrance to the centre is formed by an archway that formerly stood in Northumberland House, designed by William Kent. The archway was sold on the demolition of the building and stood in the garden of Tudor House, a local house that was purchased for the creation of the park. The archway was moved to its current location in 1998.

On 22 December 2011 the church building suffered major damage in a fire.

"Bob's Park" is next to Kingsley Hall and forms part of the Bromley by Bow Centre. In 1993 the park was shown on Land Registry maps as Bromley Recreation Ground and was also known as Grace Street Park. It was later renamed by local people after the park keeper, Robert Grenfell.

== See also ==
- Healthcare in London
- Andrew Mawson, Baron Mawson
- Social entrepreneurship
