= Tulketh =

Electoral ward in Preston, Lancashire, England

Coordinates: 53.770°N 2.722°W

- Ward location in the City of Preston district

- Location in Preston Location within Lancashire
- Population: 7,380 (2011)
- District: City of Preston
- Ceremonial county: Lancashire
- Region: North West
- Country: England
- Sovereign state: United Kingdom
- UK Parliament: Preston
- Councillors: Robert Boswell – Labour; Matthew Brown – Labour; Peter Rankin – Labour

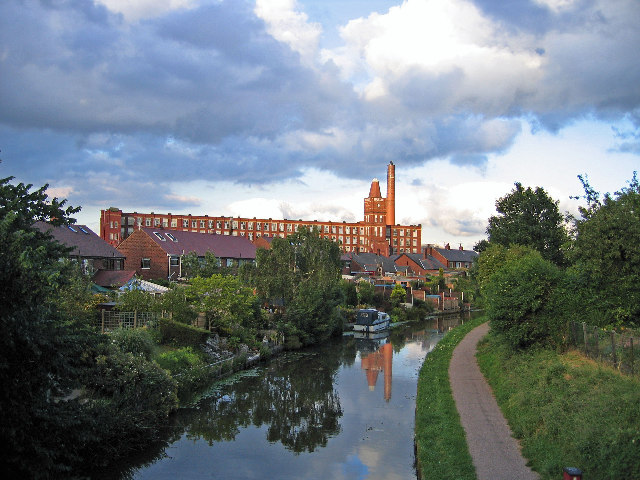
Tulketh Mill and the Lancaster Canal

Tulketh is an electoral ward in Preston, Lancashire, England. The Tulketh Mill is a notable landmark in the ward.

Tulketh returns three members to Preston City Council, elected 'in thirds' in first past the post elections each year. The ward is currently represented by three Labour councillors.

The ward forms part of the Lancashire County Council electoral division of Preston Central South. Tulketh is commonly thought of as part of Ashton on Ribble.

== Etymology ==
The name Tulketh is of Cumbric origin. The first element is tul meaning "hollow, hole, cave", while the second, -cę:d, means "woodland, forest" (corresponding to Welsh twll-coed). A common compound-formation in Welsh and Cornish toponymy, the name implies an appellative meaning of "broken woodland".

== Current members ==
Election	Member	Party
2007 Preston Council election	Robert Boswell	Labour
2008 Preston Council election	Matthew Brown	Labour
2010 Preston Council election	Peter Rankin	Labour

== Demographics ==
From the 2001 census, Tulketh ward had a population of 6,886. Of this figure, just under three-quarters (74.5) described themselves as Christian. Over 10% of the population are retired, and just under 10% are students. Here is a 2011 ethnic breakdown of Tulketh.

Tulketh 2011 Ethnic Groups	Tulketh	City of Preston
White British	83.4%	75.7%
Other White	4.9%	3.5%
Asian	6.9%	15.5%
Black	1.1%	1.2%

== Geography ==
The ward is in the northwest of Preston, taking in terraced streets and detached houses from outside the University of Central Lancashire campus to suburbia on both sides of the main Blackpool Road, and to the west of the A6 Garstang Road.

== See also ==
- Preston local elections
