= Water City =

Company interest company, East London

Water City is a community interest company (also knows Water City CIC) created by Andrew Mawson. It operates in the area in and around the Queen Elizabeth Olympic Park in East London and the Lower Lea Valley.
