= Victoria Tzortziou Brown =

Medical academic and general practitioner

Victoria Tzortziou Brown FRCGP OBE
- Medical career
- Profession: Doctor
- Field: General Practitioner
- Institutions: Queen Mary University of London

Victoria Tzortziou Brown FRCGP OBE is a medical academic and a general practitioner (GP). She has worked as a GP in London for more than 20 years and is Professor in Primary Healthcare and Health Policy at Queen Mary University of London. She was the vice chair for external affairs for Royal College of General Practitioners (RCGP) from November 2022 to November 2025, having previously been in the honorary secretary role. In July 2025, she became the first international medical graduate to be elected as chair of RCGP and assumed this role in November 2025.

== Career ==
Tzortziou Brown qualified in medicine from Aristotle University of Thessaloniki in 1997, then moved to the UK. She completed her GP training in London. She has worked for over two decades as a GP in East London. She became a GP in Tower Hamlets with a special interest in musculoskeletal conditions and sports and exercise medicine. She was a board member of the Tower Hamlets clinical commissioning group.

She was awarded a Doctor of Philosophy (PhD) in 2015. She is a fellow of the Higher Education Academy. She is a founding senior fellow of the Faculty of Medical Leadership and Management. In 2025 she became Professor in Primary Healthcare and Health Policy at Queen Mary University of London.

She was a trustee with Healthcare Quality Improvement Partnership (HQIP).

Since May 2021, she has been a non-executive director at the social enterprise and registered charity Turning Point.

== RCGP ==
Tzortziou Brown had a leadership role with the RCGP in London. She was joint honorary secretary of RCGP. From 2020, she was on the Council of the Faculty of Sport and Exercise Medicine. In August 2021, she took up a place as a nationally-elected member on the RCGP Council. She became vice chair for external affairs in November 2022. In July 2025, the RCGP announced that she had been elected to the position of Chair of their Council, to take up post in November 2025 for a term of three years.

== Honours ==
Tzortziou Brown was made an Officer of the Order of the British Empire (OBE) in the 2020 New Year Honours for services to general practice.
