= List of mills in Preston =

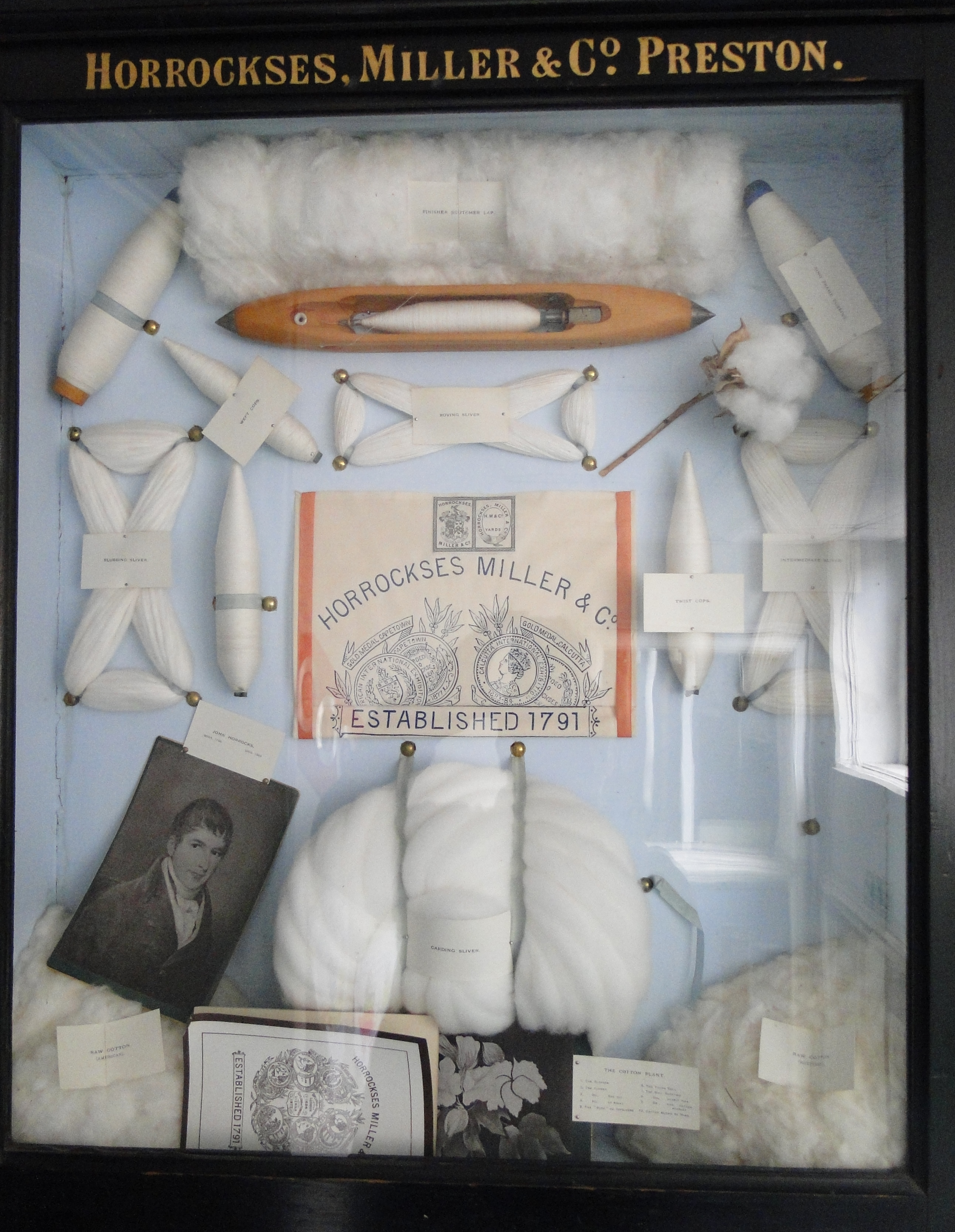
Classroom display of the stages in processing cotton.

Preston in Lancashire, England has been associated with cotton since John Horrocks built his first spinning mill, the Yellow factory, in 1791. This was powered by a Bateman & Sherratt engine. Preston mills tended to have their own reservoirs. They spun cotton using hand mules and self-actors but normally also operated power looms in weaving sheds. Local firms such as Ainscow & Tomlinson and Grundy made mules for the mills. There were 60 mills operating in Preston in 1927.

== The mills ==
=== Standing mills ===
| Name | Architect | Location | Built | Demolished | Served (Years) |
|---|---|---|---|---|---|
| Arkwright Mill | | Hawkins St SD532302 53°45′58″N 2°42′40″W | 1854 | | 171 |
| | Notes: 1891:Daniel Arkwright, 36,248 spindles, 599 looms | | | | |
| Aqueduct Street Mill | | Aqueduct St SD529304 53°46′05″N 2°42′58″W | | | |
| | Notes: 1891, together with India and Flats Mills: William Calvert and Co, 150,566 spindles | | | | |
| Brookfield Mill | | SD538305 53°46′08″N 2°42′07″W | | | |
| | Notes: 1891 together with Peel Mill: John Goodair and Co, 73,591 spindles and 1322 looms | | | | |
| Centenary Mill | | SD551297 53°45′43″N 2°40′59″W | 1895 | Standing | 130 |
| | Notes: Grade II listed building Known as Horrockses, it was powered by a four-cylindered horizontal triple-expansion engine by John Musgrave & Sons that delivered 2000 ihp.. The mill had rolled steel beams and concrete floors. | | | | |
| Cliff Mill | | SD557297 53°45′43″N 2°40′23″W | | | |
| Embroidery Mill | | | | | |
| Fylde Road Mill | | SD530300 53°45′50″N 2°42′50″W | | | |
| Hartford Mill | | Campbell St SD551298 53°45′47″N 2°40′59″W | | | |
| | Notes: 1891:Hartford Mills Co Ltd, 43472 spindles, 662 looms | | | | |
| Hanover Mill (Moss Mill; Spital's Moss Mill; Moss Shed) | | Fylde Road SD533299 53°45′47″N 2°42′36″W | 1796 | | 229 |
| | Notes: | | | | |
| Hanover Street Mill | | Gt George St SD539303 53°46′01″N 2°41′56″W | | | |
| | Notes: 1891:Birley Brothers, 46,466 spindles, 826 looms | | | | |
| Pitt Street Mill | | SD534294 53°45′32″N 2°42′29″W | | | |
| Red Scar Mill | | SD525306 53°46′12″N 2°43′19″W | | 1939 | |
| | Notes: Then produced rayon until 1980 | | | | |
| Stocksbridge Mill | | SD525306 53°46′12″N 2°43′19″W | | | |
| St Georges Road Mill | | SD539306 53°46′12″N 2°42′04″W | | | |
| | Notes: 1891: Moor Park Manufacturing Co, Limited, 600 looms | | | | |
| Shelley Road Mill | | SD525303 53°46′01″N 2°43′19″W | | | |
| | Notes: 1891:Hartley Brothers, 42,560 spindles, 864 looms | | | | |
| Tulketh Mill | FW Dixon | SD524309 53°46′19″N 2°43′26″W | 1905 | Standing | 120 |
| | Notes: Grade II listed building Powered by a J&E Wood, 2000 ihp, horizontal cross compound, Corliss valves with superheated steam. Initially 4 Lancashire boilers fifth Yorkshire boiler added in 1918. The 24 ft flywheel was geared for 44 ropes. The chimney was 77 yds tall, later reduced to 60, when the mill was lengthened to 427 ft in 1918 it housed 127,400 mule and 12,600 ring spindles | | | | |

=== Other mills ===
| Name | Architect | Location | Built | Demolished | Served (Years) |
|---|---|---|---|---|---|
| Albert | | Cemetery Rd, Preston | | | |
| | Notes: 1891: J. F. Woods and Co, 445 looms | | | | |
| Alexandra | | Skeffington Road North, Preston | | | |
| | Notes: 1891: Wilding Brothers, 1022 looms | | | | |
| Alliance Works | | New Hall Lane, Preston | | | |
| | Notes: 1891:Thomas Brindle and Co, 1070 looms | | | | |
| Arthur Street | | Preston | | | |
| Ashton Shed | | Preston | | | |
| | Notes: 1891: Richard Walsh and Co, 470 looms | | | | |
| Astley Field | | St Pauls Rd, Preston | | | |
| | Notes: 1891:Martin Hopkins and Co, 448 looms | | | | |
| Avenham | | Preston | | | |
| Back Lane | | Preston | | | |
| Bamber Bridge Spinning & Weaving Co Ltd | | Wesley St, Bamber Bridge | | | |
| | Notes: Horizontal 4-cylinder triple by J&E Wood with 26 ft flywheel, housed 127,500 mule spindles | | | | |
| Bank Top | | Preston | | | |
| | Notes: 1891: (together with Hopwood St and Primrose Hill Mills): William Paley, 30,992 spindles | | | | |
| Broomfield | | Preston | | | |
| | Notes: 1891, (together with Grimshaw Mill): John Anderton, 1764 looms | | | | |
| Bold Street | | Preston | | | |
| | Notes: 1891: Moses S. Maynard, 42,000 spindles | | | | |
| Bow Lane | | Preston | | | |
| Bridge Street | | Preston | | | |
| Brookhouse | | Old Lancaster Lane, Preston | 1845 | | 180 |
| | Notes: Grade II listed building 1891: John and Adam Leigh, 40,520 spindles and 1,156 looms Engine: 500hp cross compound engine by Ashton Frost, 1906 | | | | |
| Brunswick Place | | Preston | | | |
| Bushell Street | | Lancaster Rd North, Preston | | | |
| | Notes: 1891: John Humber, 702 looms | | | | |
| Bute | | Preston | | | |
| Cable Street | | Preston | | | |
| Castle Street | | Preston | | | |
| Caledonian Go | | Pitt St, Preston | | | |
| | Notes: 1891:William Entwisle's Sons, 437 looms | | | | |
| Canal Street | | Preston | | | |
| Cottage Street | | Preston | | | |
| Croft Street | | Preston | | | |
| | Notes: 1891:William Henry Hincksman, 36,620 spindles | | | | |
| Dale Street | | Preston | | | |
| Deepdale | | Preston | | | |
| Edward Street | | Preston | | | |
| Eldon Street (Stocks Bridge) | P.Pickup | Preston | 1903 | | 122 |
| | Notes: Powered by a Yates & Thom, 800ihp cross compound | | | | |
| Emerson Road | | Preston | | | |
| Fishwick | | Preston | | | |
| | Notes: 1891: Swainson, Birley and Co, 95,562 spindles | | | | |
| Fitzroy Street | | Preston | | | |
| Flats | | Victoria Rd, Walton-le-Dale | | | |
| | Notes: 1891, together with Aqueduct and India Mills: William Calvert and Co, 150,566 spindles | | | | |
| Frenchwood | | Preston | | | |
| Fylde Road Shed | | Preston | | | |
| | Notes: 1891: S. and E. Leese, 40,924 spindles and Edward Hayes, 331 looms | | | | |
| Grimshaw Street | | Preston | | | |
| Greenbank | | Preston | | | |
| | Notes: 1891 together with St Paul's Rd Mill: John Hawkins and Sons, 95,352 spindles | | | | |
| Heatley Street | | Preston | | | |
| Higher Walton | | Blackburn Rd, Higher Walton | | | |
| | Notes: | | | | |
| Hopwood Street | | Preston | | | |
| | Notes: 1891: (together with Bank Top and Primrose Hill Mills): William Paley, 30,992 spindles | | | | |
| Hunt Street | | Preston | | | |
| India | | New Hall Lane, Preston | 1864 | 1972 | 108 |
| | Notes: 1891, together with Aqueduct and Flats Mills: William Calvert and Co, 150,566 spindles | | | | |
| Kay Street | | Preston | | | |
| | Notes: 1891: F. Mangnall and Co, 32,000 spindles | | | | |
| Kent Street | | Preston | | | |
| Lawson | | Cumberland St, Preston | | | |
| | Notes: William Shaw and Co, 416 looms | | | | |
| Lord Street | | Tithebarn St, Preston | | | |
| | Notes: 1891: 11,700 spindles | | | | |
| Lutwidge | | Isherwood St, Preston | | | |
| | Notes: 1891: Birley, Beaumont and Co, 27,160 spindles | | | | |
| Manchester | | Preston | | | |
| | Notes: | | | | |
| Markland Street | | Preston | | | |
| Marsh Lane | | Preston | | | |
| | Notes: 1891:Brotherton and Co, 576 looms | | | | |
| Meadow Street | | Preston | | | |
| Moor Brook | | Preston | | | |
| | Notes: 1891:William Anderton, 744 looms and J. R. and A. Smith Ltd, 1140 looms | | | | |
| Moor Hall | | Preston | | | |
| | Notes: 1891:Edward Healey, 684 looms | | | | |
| Moor Park | | Preston | | | |
| Moor Lane | | Preston | | | |
| Murray Street | | Preston | | | |
| New Hall Lane | | Preston | 1856 | | 169 |
| | Notes: Grade II listed building 1891 with Victoria and Wellington Mill: Eccles Brothers, 90,428 spindles, 1078 looms | | | | |
| New Hall Lane (Rigby Street) | | Rigby St, Preston | | | |
| | Notes: 1891:Paul Catterall, Son and Co, 42,296 spindles | | | | |
| New Preston | | Preston | | | |
| | Notes: 1891 (together with Yard and New Preston Mills): Horrockses, Crewdson and Co, Limited, 131,200 spindles and 4405 looms | | | | |
| Orr & Co. (Bamber Bridge) | | School Lane, Bamber Bridge | | | |
| Oxhey | | Ripon St, Preston | | | |
| | Notes: 1891: Oxhey Cotton Spinning and Manufacturing Co Ltd, 18,086 spindles | | | | |
| Parker Street | | Preston | | | |
| | Notes: 1891:Joseph and John Haslam, 42000 spindles | | | | |
| Park | | North Rd, Preston | | | |
| | Notes: 1891: Park Lane Twist Co Ltd, 48,760 spindles | | | | |
| Park Lane | | Preston | | | |
| Peel | | Preston | | | |
| | Notes: 1891 together with Brookfield Mill: John Goodair and Co, 73,591 spindles and 1322 looms | | | | |
| Pole Street | | Preston | | | |
| | Notes: 1891: M.B. Copland, 27,812 spindles | | | | |
| Primrose Hill | | Primrose Hill, Preston | | | |
| | Notes: 1891: (together with Hopwood St and Bank Top Mills): William Paley, 30,992 spindles | | | | |
| Progress | | Preston | | | |
| Queens | | Greenbank St, Preston | | | |
| | Notes: William Smith and Co, 770 looms | | | | |
| Raglan | | Preston | | | |
| Ribble Street | | Preston | | | |
| Ribbleton | | Preston | | | |
| | Notes: 1891: (together with Southgate Mill) Joseph Smith, 67,550 spindles | | | | |
| Ribble Bank | | Preston | | | |
| Ribbleton Lane | | Preston | | | |
| Sedgewick Street | | Preston | | | |
| Soho (Fylde Road) | | Preston | | | |
| Southgate | | Preston | | | |
| | Notes: 1891: (together with Ribbleton Mill) Joseph Smith, 67,550 spindles | | | | |
| Sovereign | | Preston | | | |
| | Notes: 1891 together with Yard and New Preston Mills: Horrockses, Crewdson and Co, Limited, 131,200 spindles and 4405 looms | | | | |
| Spa | | Marsh Lane, Preston | | | |
| | Notes: 1891:Levi Fish, 530 looms | | | | |
| Springfield | | Brook St, Preston | | | |
| | Notes: 1891: Richard Goodair Ltd, 836 looms | | | | |
| Steam | | Fylde Rd, Preston | | | |
| | Notes: 1891: Joseph Eccles and Co, 548 looms | | | | |
| Stourton | | Fishwick, Preston | | | |
| | Notes: Mellor Brothers, Limited, 30,500 spindles | | | | |
| St Pauls Road | | Preston | | | |
| | Notes: 1891 together with Greenbank Mill: John Hawkins and Sons, 95,352 spindles | | | | |
| Swillbrook | | Preston | | | |
| | Notes: 1891 together with Deepdale: Hampson and Fish Ltd, 1786 looms | | | | |
| Tennyson Road | | Preston | | | |
| | Notes: 1891: Cotton Spinning and Manufacturing Co., Limited, 480 looms | | | | |
| Tulketh Mill | | Preston | | | |
| | Notes: | | | | |
| Turk's Head | | Preston | | | |
| Walker Street | | Preston | | | |
| Waverley Park | | Preston | | | |
| Wellfield | | Preston | | | |
| | Notes: 1891: Preston Cotton Spinning and Manufacturing Co, Limited, 49,672 spindles | | | | |
| Wellington | | Preston | | | |
| | Notes: 1891 (with Victoria and New Hall Lane Mill): Eccles Brothers, 90,428 spindles, 1078 looms | | | | |
| Wharton | | Preston | | | |
| Willow Street | | Preston | | | |
| Victoria (Peel Hall Street) | | Preston | | | |
| | Notes: 1891: John Liver and Co, 476 looms | | | | |
| Victoria (nr New Quay) | | Preston | | | |
| Yard Works (Horrockses) | | Preston | | | |
| | Notes: 1891 (together with Sovereign and New Preston Mills): Horrockses, Crewdson and Co, Limited, 131,200 spindles and 4405 looms | | | | |

== See also ==
- List of mills owned by the Lancashire Cotton Corporation Limited

== Bibliography ==
- Ashmore, Owen (1982). The industrial archaeology of North-west England. Manchester University Press. ISBN 0-7190-0820-4.
- Dickinson, T.C. (2002). Cotton Mills of Preston.The power behind the thread. ISBN 1859360963.
