= Andrew Mawson, Baron Mawson =

British social entrepreneur (born 1954)

The Right Honourable The Lord Mawson OBE
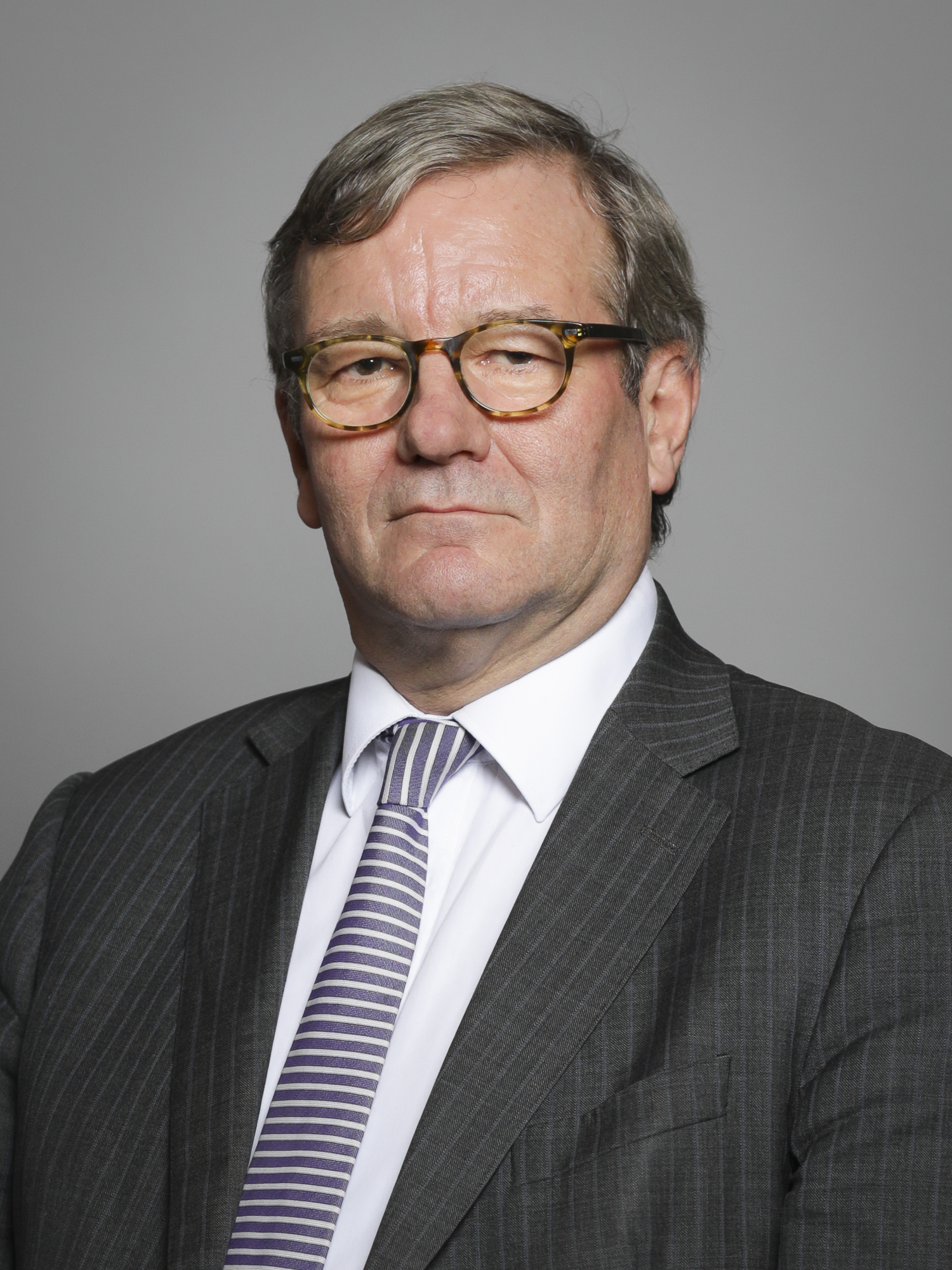

Member of the House of Lords
- Lord Temporal
- Life peerage 29 March 2007

Personal details
- Born: 8 November 1954 (age 71)

Andrew Mawson, Baron Mawson, OBE (born 8 November 1954) is an English social entrepreneur.

== Early life ==
Andrew Mawson was brought up in Bradford, Yorkshire. He trained for Christian ministry at the Northern Baptist College in Manchester under Principal Michael H. Taylor. He gained a BA degree in theology from the Victoria University of Manchester.

== Community work ==
He is best known for his work at the Bromley by Bow Centre in East London, which became the UK's first Healthy Living Centre. The Bromley by Bow Centre is a community organisation which encompasses an array of integrated social enterprises based around art, health, education and practical skills. Mawson was appointed OBE in the Millennium New Year Honours List for his work there since 1984.

In 1995 he helped organise the Great Banquet which resulted in 33,000 people having a meal with Adele Blakebrough and Helen Taylor Thompson. In 1998 these three founded the Community Action Network, a UK national charity, and remained its President until 2010. He was also a founder board member of Poplar HARCA. In 2006, he launched the Water City initiative for East London with Richard Rogers, aiming to revitalise the neglected waterways of East London, making use of their potential as transport links.

A number of his projects are pursued by his company Andrew Mawson Partnerships, which takes on regeneration work in London and throughout the country.

In 2010 he was leading the regeneration of St Paul's Way Trust School, a failing school in East London, with a vision to transform the area around it.

== House of Lords ==
In February 2007, it was announced by the House of Lords Appointments Commission that he would be made a life peer; he sits as a crossbencher. The peerage was gazetted on 29 March 2007 as Baron Mawson, of Bromley-by-Bow in the London Borough of Tower Hamlets. He was introduced as a peer on 30 April 2007.

Mawson criticised the Civil Service, local strategic partnerships and most public consultation as ineffective. His 2008 book The Social Entrepreneur: Making Communities Work aims to provide a practical guide to social entrepreneurship and demonstrate, through his own experiences, that the role of the state has often stifled innovation. Despite his criticisms of government structures, the book shows what can be achieved with perseverance.

Orders of precedence in the United Kingdom
Preceded by The Lord Krebs	Gentlemen; Baron Mawson	Followed by The Lord Malloch-Brown
