= British Association of Physicians of Indian Origin =

- Abbreviation: BAPIO
- Formation: 1996
- Type: Medical association
- Headquarters: Bedford
- President: Ramesh Mehta OBE
- Website: BAPIO

The British Association of Physicians of Indian Origin (BAPIO) is a voluntary organisation for doctors of Indian sub-continental origin, established in 1996 and based in the United Kingdom. Its president is Ramesh Mehta of Bedford Hospital NHS Trust.

BAPIO is divided into regional centres across the UK, the largest division is in Wales. Its roles, which have included medical education, discussion forums and supporting physicians in difficulty, have led to its involvement in some high-profile court cases and debates. In 2007, BAPIO took its challenge on the 2006 immigration rules to the court of appeal after it initially lost the case against the government. The High court ruled in BAPIOs favour. In 2013, BAPIO sought a judicial review of the way the Royal College of General Practitioners (RCGP) conducted the clinical skills assessment exam. This was a legal victory for the RCGP, however, in the judges words "a moral success" for BAPIO.

== Membership ==
BAPIO recruits its membership predominantly from doctors of Indian sub-continental origin including India, Pakistan, Bangladesh, Sri Lanka and Nepal.

== Corporate structure ==
The association is divided into regional centres. The Welsh division of BAPIO is its largest. In 2015, an eighth of the 30% of overseas clinicians in Wales trained in India. These doctors were posted in highly deprived areas where patients were more complex and workload greater. Between 2016 and 2017, BAPIO worked with the Welsh health boards by recruiting Indian doctors on fixed two-year placements. The association additionally helps exchange skills and ideas between India and Wales. In 2017, secretary Dr Hasmukh Shah said: "Britain's proposed exit from the Europe Union allows us in Wales to renew the historical links between the Indian subcontinent and the NHS".

== Roles ==
The BAPIO has a number of roles including education, discussion forums, support in difficulty, networking and charitable work. According to them, unconscious bias in the NHS and differences in soft skills are some of the factors behind the disparity between non-UK trained and UK-trained doctors being referred for General Medical Council performance. Gender, age and speciality have also been noted to be significant factors.

During its annual conference in November 2012, the association passed a motion asking that suicides by health care workers while undergoing investigations should be treated as a "never event."

In 2021, during the COVID-19 pandemic in India, BAPIO set up fundraising for oxygen and telemedicine to support medical professionals in India.

== Awards ==
In 2014, BMA deputy chairman Kailash Chand received a leadership excellence award from the BAPIO at its annual conference. In addition, a personal message from prime minister of India Shri Narendra Modi was received: "India is very proud that the dedication of Indian doctors has remained the backbone of the health services in the UK and will remain so for the foreseeable future."

== Legal challenges ==
=== 2006 Immigration rules ===
In April 2006, BAPIO, along with the BMA and Royal College of Physicians, raised concerns over changing immigration rules, which favoured EU medical recruits. In an attempt to keep junior posts open for British or EU graduates due to an expansion in medical graduate numbers by the year 2000, the Department of Health retrospectively sought to prohibit International Medical Graduates (IMGs) from applying for training positions in the NHS.

BAPIO stated "at least 15,000 doctors may have to leave the UK heavily in debt and without having completed qualifications, despite having been encouraged to come to the UK in the first place".

In 2007, BAPIO took its challenge to the court of appeal after it initially lost the case against the government. The High Court ruled that the Department of Health's guideline was illegal. The House of Lords upheld the judgement in April 2008. However, 'thousands of overseas doctors had already had their opportunity of permit-free training abruptly withdrawn at great personal and financial costs to themselves and their careers'. The judge had explained that the previous shortage of British trained doctors had been alleviated by particularly Indian doctors, but that medical schools had since increased their intake of students, hence increasing competition. The judge added that the government was not obliged to consult beforehand with BAPIO, and despite the home office failing to carry out racial equality assessments, "quashing" the regulations would not be justified.

=== 2013 Clinical skills assessment ===
In 2008, BAPIO estimated that there were around 40,000 doctors of Indian origin working in the National Health Service. They estimated that the intake in UK Medical Schools of Indian origin students was about 20%. Doctors from the subcontinent have had difficulties in getting jobs in the most popular specialities and the most desirable areas as was exposed by the work of Aneez Esmail and Sam Everington.

In 2013 the Association launched a legal challenge to the regulator, the General Medical Council, and the standards body, the Royal College of General Practitioners, alleging that the clinical skills assessment component of the Membership exam was discriminatory and seeking a judicial review of the way the RCGP conducts the test, because there is a "significant difference in pass rates which cannot be explained by a lack of any knowledge, skill or competency on the part of the International Medical Graduates". 65.3% of international graduates failed their first attempt at the Clinical Skills Assessment (CSA) component of the MRCGP exam in 2011/12, compared with 9.9% of UK graduates. In 2010/11, 59.2% of the international graduates failed at the first attempt, compared with 8.2% of UK graduates, while in 2008, 43% of IMGs failed the CSA compared with 8.3% of UK graduates.

The legal challenge cost the Association at least £50,000. Mr Justice John Mitting presiding over the case said that the Royal College of General Practitioners was neither racially discriminatory nor in breach of its public sector equality duty. He said he was satisfied that the CSA "put south Asians of both categories [UK-educated and those who studied overseas] at a disadvantage" but he described the assessment itself as "proportionate" and designed to achieve "legitimate ends". but it was time for the RCGP to 'eliminate discrimination' in the MRCGP and address the disparity in pass rates for non-white groups. The judge stated "This claim has served useful purpose and achieved not a legal victory, but a moral success".

Aneez Esmail was asked to analyse data on more than 5,000 candidates who sat the CSA exam over a two-year period by the GMC. He found that 'subjective bias due to racial discrimination may be a cause' of the different pass rates for between white and non-white graduates.

According to RCGP chairwoman Dr Clare Gerada, the exam is culturally specific, they take equality and diversity issues seriously and candidates eventually pass. Her successor, Dr Maureen Baker also met the court decision with favour. She stated that "the RCGP has been at the forefront of identifying the differences in pass rates for some time" and they "were the first of the Medical Royal Colleges to publicly raise this issue" and commission research into the cause of the discrepancies. In 2014, the RCGP pledged to support candidates and work with BAPIO and the British International Doctors Association (BIDA).
