= Membership of the Royal College of General Practitioners =

Membership of the Royal College of General Practitioners (MRCGP) is a postgraduate medical qualification in the United Kingdom (UK) run by the Royal College of General Practitioners (RCGP). On successful completion of the assessment, general practitioners are eligible to use the post-nominal letters MRCGP that indicate Membership of the RCGP (with continued payment of RCGP fees).

The MRCGP exam was first offered to doctors in 1965 and was originally an optional qualification. In 2007 the MRCGP became an integrated training and assessment system to prepare doctors for working in general practice. Doctors are now required to succeed in the MRCGP assessments in order to be issued with a certificate of completion of their specialty training (CCT) in general practice.

== MRCGP Postgraduate Qualification since 2007 ==
In 2007 a new system of assessment was introduced, delivered locally in conjunction with deaneries, with the qualification awarded on completion of a three-year specialty training programme.

Immediately after the introduction of the 2007 changes the term "nMRCGP" had helped to differentiate between old and new assessment procedures (with n meaning new). After several years, once all trainees were being assessed using the new methods, the "n" was dropped.

== GP Curriculum ==
The GP Curriculum was first published by the RCGP in 2006. The Postgraduate Medical Education and Training Board (PMETB) approved it to be used for GP Specialty Training, and it was introduced for all programmes starting from 1 August 2007. The curriculum is continually updated.

Having taken over from PMETB as the body responsible for assuring postgraduate medical education, the General Medical Council (GMC) approved the GP curriculum and assessment blue print against the published standards in 2010.

== MRCGP assessment ==
MRCGP assessment comprises three components, each of which tests different competences using validated assessment methods. In combination these assessments cover the spectrum of knowledge, skills, behaviours and attitudes that are outlined in the GP Specialty Training curriculum.

=== Applied Knowledge Test ===
- The Applied Knowledge Test (AKT) is a multiple-choice computer based assessment that tests the knowledge base underpinning general practice in the UK. It covers clinical medicine, critical appraisal/evidence-based clinical practice and health informatics/administrative issues.

=== Simulated Consultation Assessment ===
- The Simulated Consultation Assessment (SCA) is a summative assessment of a doctor's ability to integrate and apply clinical, professional, and communication skills appropriate for general practice. It uses live video or audio consultations with simulated (actor) patients, which attempt to replicate 'real life' consultations within UK General Practice. The assessment covers a range of encounters relevant to most parts of the curriculum and also provides an opportunity to target particular aspects of clinical care and expertise. This was introduced to replace the Recorded Consultation Assessment (RCA), which itself was designed and introduced at haste during the COVID-19 pandemic to replace the Clinical Skills Assessment (CSA), the original face-to-face clinical and consultation skills assessment of the MRCGP.

=== Workplace-Based Assessment ===
- The Workplace-Based Assessment (WPBA) uses a number of tools to evaluate a doctor's performance over time, in twelve areas of professional competence. This assessment takes place in the workplace throughout a GP specialty training programme.

== History of the MRCGP Qualification ==
The MRCGP exam was first offered to general practitioners in 1965 and from 1968 it has been a requirement for GPs to hold this in order to join the college. Before 2007 the MRCGP was a credit accumulation exam. Candidates needed to pass four modules within three years, or retake the whole exam.

== Controversy ==
Analysis of the results of the CSA part of the MRCGP examination showed that some groups of doctors were more likely to score lower marks. Consistently high failure rates were seen amongst doctors who had gained their primary medical qualification outside the United Kingdom, who were mostly of South Asian and African origins. The GMC asked Professor Aneez Esmail to carry out an independent review of the MRCGP exam which was published in September 2013. In October 2013 legal action taken by the British Association of Physicians of Indian Origin (BAPIO) led to a judicial review being granted to review the fairness of the CSA assessment, although the judge also ruled that the GMC should also be included in the action. At the Judicial Review hearing at the High Court in April 2014, the Clinical Skills Assessment (CSA) was judged to be lawful.
