= Ramesh Mehta (paediatrician) =

Indian-born British paediatrician

Ramesh Mehta CBE
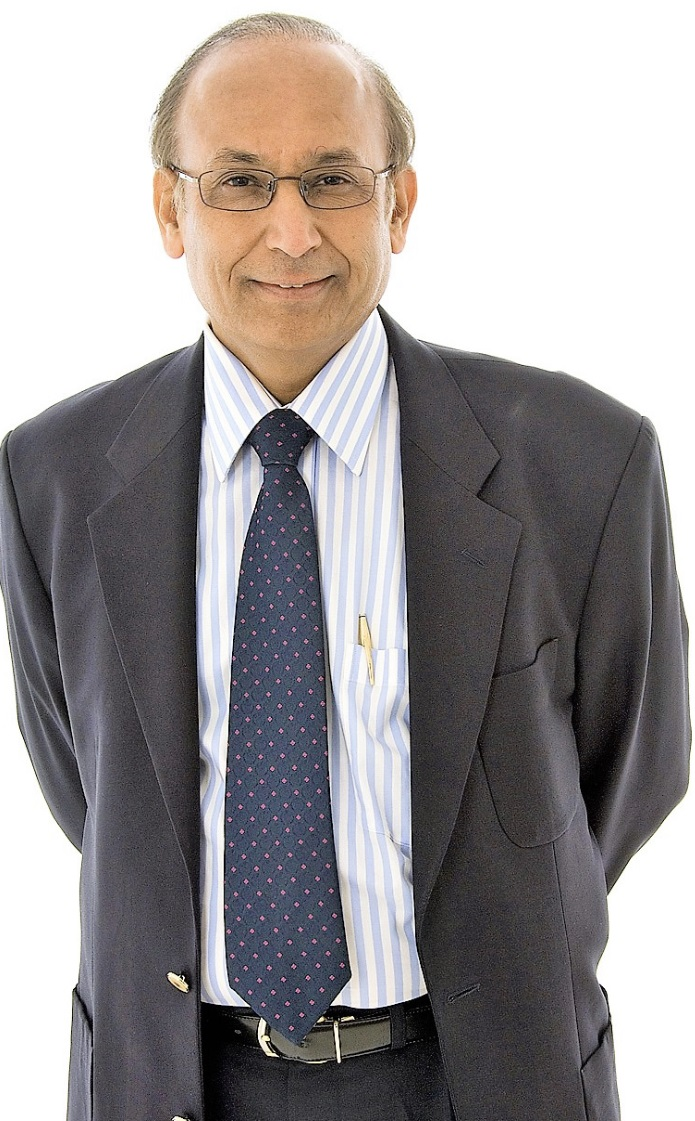
- Born: 1947 (age 78–79) pandhurna MP
- Education: Government Medical College and Hospital, Nagpur
- Occupation: Paediatrician
- Known for: President of the British Association of Physicians of Indian Origin (BAPIO)
- Medical career
- Profession: Paediatrician
- Institutions: Bedford Hospital

Ramesh Dulichandbhai Mehta CBE (born 1947) is an Indian-born British paediatrician at Bedford Hospital, and president of the British Association of Physicians of Indian Origin (BAPIO), in the United Kingdom.

== Early life and education ==
Ramesh Mehta was born in 1947 in a village in central India. From the age of seven, he aspired to become a doctor. Prior to immigrating to the United Kingdom in 1981, he undertook his undergraduate training at the Government Medical College and Hospital, Nagpur, where he completed his postgraduate paediatrics training. He then completed his higher specialist training in the UK, obtained Fellowship of the Royal College of Paediatrics & Child Health.

== Clinical career ==
Mehta served as a consultant paediatrician at Bedford Hospital and was involved in developing paediatric services; he later held an honorary consultant role at Great Ormond Street Hospital. He has been a postgraduate clinical tutor associated with the University of Cambridge and served on the Council of the Royal College of Paediatrics and Child Health (RCPCH). BAPIO RCPCH BAPIO Training Academy

== Equality, diversity and inclusion ==
In 1996, he founded the British Association of Physicians of Indian Origin (BAPIO). He led the BAPIO challenge against the British government's April 2006 "guideline" to hospital trusts to employ non-EU doctors only if no candidate from the EU is available. This was affecting thousands of International Medical Graduates in NHS training posts. BAPIO won a landmark verdict against the British government when the country's highest court ruled illegal a state guideline discriminating against overseas medical graduates for employment in state health services.

He also led a BAPIO legal challenge against the Royal College of General Practitioners and the General Medical Council over the differential pass rates for BME trainees in the clinical skills assessment required to become a GP in the UK. However, a High Court judge ruled that the clinical skills assessment did not unlawfully discriminate against ethnic minority candidates. But Mr Justice Mitting said that the association had won "if not a legal victory, then a moral success" and called on the college to act over the disparity in success rates between white UK graduates and those from ethnic minorities who qualified in the UK or abroad.

He has been working on eradicating differential attainment for doctors from Black and minority ethnic backgrounds and international medical graduates, who make up over a third of the UK medical doctors. He inspired the seminal work - Bridging the Gap in 2021, which produced 10 consensus recommendations for the tackling bias in the full spectrum of medical careers. He has worked on improving workforce recruitment and retention through his project on establishing the Dignity Charter for the NHS which was launched at the Royal College of Surgeons by Sir Stephen Powis in October 2022. As a champion of international medical graduates and locally employed doctors, Ramesh Mehta led the Charter for Locally Employed Doctors which was launched at the first ever conference for Locally Employed Doctors in the UK in summer of 2022.

Dr. Mehta is also the co-founder and past president of the Global Association of Physicians of Indian Origin (GAPIO).

== Honours ==
Mehta was appointed Officer of the Order of the British Empire (OBE) in 2017 for services to healthcare and Commander of the Order of the British Empire (CBE) in the 2023 New Year Honours for services to equality, diversity and inclusion.

== Charity work ==
In 2020, during the COVID-19 pandemic in the UK, Mehta wrote to the UK home secretary requesting that international medical professionals be exempt from the Health and Care Worker visa, also known as the 'NHS visa'. The following year, during the COVID-19 pandemic in India, he announced an online support plan by doctors of Indian origin living in the UK to help in remote towns and villages in India, including free online evaluations of X-Rays and CT scans. In addition they would raise funds for oxygen concentrators.

== Selected publications ==
- Daga, Sunil; Chakravorty, Indranil; Bamrah, JS; Menon, Geeta; Dave, Subodh; Chakravorty, Subarna; Bhala, Neeraj; Mehta, Ramesh (9 May 2020). "Self-reported Occupational Risk for COVID-19 in Hospital Doctors from Black Asian & Minority Ethnic Communities in UK". The Physician. 6 (1). doi:10.38192/1.6.1.9. ISSN 2732-5148. (Co-author)
- Chakravorty, Indranil; Daga, Sunil; Dave, Subodh; Chakravorty, Subarna; Bhala, Neeraj; Menon, Geeta; Mehta, Ramesh; Bamrah, JS (23 April 2020). "An Online Survey of Healthcare Professionals in the COVID-19 Pandemic in the UK". Sushruta Journal of Health Policy & Opinion. 13 (2). doi:10.38192/13.2.9. ISSN 2732-5164. (Co-author)
- Daga, Sunil; Jafferbhoy, Sadaf; Menon, Geeta; Ali, Mansoor; Chakravorty, Subarna; Ghani, Saqib; Burney, Amir; Bamrah, JS; Mehta, Ramesh; Chakravorty, Indranil (20 June 2020). "Does Gender or Religion Contribute to the Risk of COVID-19 in Hospital Doctors in the UK?". Sushruta Journal of Health Policy & Opinion. 13 (3): 1–11. doi:10.38192/13.3.1. ISSN 2732-5164. (Co-author)
- Dave, Subodh; Chakravorty, Indranil; Menon, Geeta; Sidhu, Kamal; Bamrah, JS; Mehta, Ramesh (9 August 2020). "Differential Attainment in Summative Assessments within Postgraduate Medical Education & Training". Sushruta Journal of Health Policy & Opinion. 13 (3). doi:10.38192/13.3.15. ISSN 2732-5164. (Co-author)
