= Personal health budgets =

Professor Lord Darzi's review of the NHS in 2008 introduced the idea of personal health budgets (PHBs) in the English National Health Service. Since October 2014 people eligible for NHS Continuing Healthcare were given the legal right to have a personal health budget. NHS England’s Five Year Forward View called for a ‘major expansion’ of the scheme. NHS Choices describes personal health budgets as a way "to give people with long-term conditions and disabilities greater choice and control over the healthcare and support they receive."

== Practical arrangements ==
A personal health budget may be used by a patient to buy a range of services or items to meet their health and well-being needs. This might include things that aren't traditionally commissioned by the NHS, or may be used to pay for services like nursing care which are provided by the NHS, but giving them more autonomy in deciding where, how and when their care and support is provided.

A personal health budget can be managed in three different ways:

- A notional budget where no money changes hands and an NHS organisation manages the money on someone's behalf
- A third-party arrangement: an organisation legally independent of the patient and the NHS manages the money
- A direct payment: money is transferred directly to the patient, and they buy the goods and services agreed in their personalized care and support plan

The Royal College of General Practitioners produced guidance for its members on the use of Personal health budgets in 2012. PHBs have been mainly used for people with continuing health needs. The RCGP explained that "At the heart of a personal health budget is a care or support plan – an agreement between the local NHS and the individual that sets out the person’s health needs, the amount of money available to meet those needs and how this money will be spent."

By 2015-16 expenditure on PHBs was estimated at £123 million per year, just over 0.1% of NHS spending. The number of people with a budget was 4,800, so the average package costs £25,600. PHBs have been targeted on people with most significant needs, generally people on continuing care packages.

Birmingham Hospice has a Personal Health Budget Team which brings personalised social care to end of life patients. In 2022 they won the ‘HRH The Prince of Wales Award for Integrated Approaches to Care' at the Nursing Times Awards in October 2022.

== Expansion ==
In April 2018 the Department of Health and Social Care proposed to increase the scope of the scheme, claiming that personal health budgets had reduced NHS continuing healthcare costs by 17%. At present only people receiving continuing healthcare funding have a right to a personal health budget, though clinical commissioning groups may offer personal health budgets to others. The new groups proposed to be eligible are:

- People with ongoing social care needs;
- Those eligible for section 117 aftercare services and who make ongoing use of community mental health services;
- Those leaving the armed forces;
- People with a learning disability, autism or both; and
- People who access wheelchair services whose posture and mobility needs impact their wider health and social care needs.

It is proposed that those eligible should have an explicit right to receive direct payments.

By May 2019 54,143 people had used a Personal Health Budget. These can also be used to purchase technical devices to control curtains, lighting, heating and door intercoms. It is expected that the number of users will increase substantially. There has not been any increase in funding, but the system now gives people more control.

From December 2019, about 100,000 people eligible for an NHS wheelchair or requiring aftercare services under the Mental Health Act 1983 are entitled to a personal health budget.

== Advocates ==
Personal budgets have been widely adopted in social care and have been championed by, among others, Liz Kendall, who advocated extending the idea into health services. Simon Duffy, who was the chief executive of the influential social enterprise company In Control, was one of the creators of Self Directed Support which piloted the idea with people with learning disabilities. According to him "If you don't tell people what the budget is, as a local authority you are forced into a position of planning for them in order to ration, but if you give them a budget, doing the rationing up front, you liberate people and their families to do their own planning, and liberate service providers to do creative planning. Philosophically, this is a shift towards clarity about rights and duties." His ideas were formulated in the Deinstitutionalisation of social care, where there has been much greater progress in the development of personal budgets. He was awarded the Albert Medal by Ivan Lewis who was at that time the minister for social care and championed his ideas in the Department of Health.

The Metropolitan Borough of Barnsley is piloting both individual social care budgets and the Right to Control scheme to provide personal budgets integrated across different services. Martin Farran, who is the council’s executive director of adults and community services and also leads in this area for the Association of Directors of Adult Social Services is keen to extend personalisation into health, particularly mental health. He says this would "free up a lot of resources for better outcomes and at a lower cost.”

== Criticism ==
A survey by Pulse in September 2015, based on Freedom of Information requests to Clinical Commissioning Groups was headlined "Revealed: NHS funding splashed on holidays, games consoles and summer houses" and generated considerable publicity. An angry 81-year-old widow in Gateshead complained that the NHS “can afford to pay for horse riding lessons but can’t get me to hospital.”

According to Pulse the scheme has been used to pay for unevidenced treatments at the expense of long-established services, which are no longer provided. Duffy said PHBs made up a tiny percentage of NHS spending. It was assessed and approved by health professionals. "You cannot simply turn up to your GP and ask for a summer house.".... "There would have been no advantage in people carrying on spending the money exactly as the NHS used to spend the money."

Critics claim that giving money to individuals, rather than providing services, represents further fragmentation and is a move towards privatisation of public services, using a more consumerist approach. There are also worries that vulnerable people can be given heavy responsibilities that may add to their stress.

== Holland ==
A similar scheme was introduced in the Netherlands in 1997. Because the number of personal budget holders increased tenfold between 2002 and 2010, and expenditure increased on average by 23% a year, restrictions were introduced. From 2014, only people who would otherwise have to move to a nursing or residential home could keep their budget or apply for one to enable them to continue living at home. There were reports of fraud and improper behaviour by brokers who handled money on behalf of vulnerable people who were not able to manage the budget themselves.

== See also ==
- Person-centred planning
- Care in the Community
