= Sam Everington =

British physician and administrator

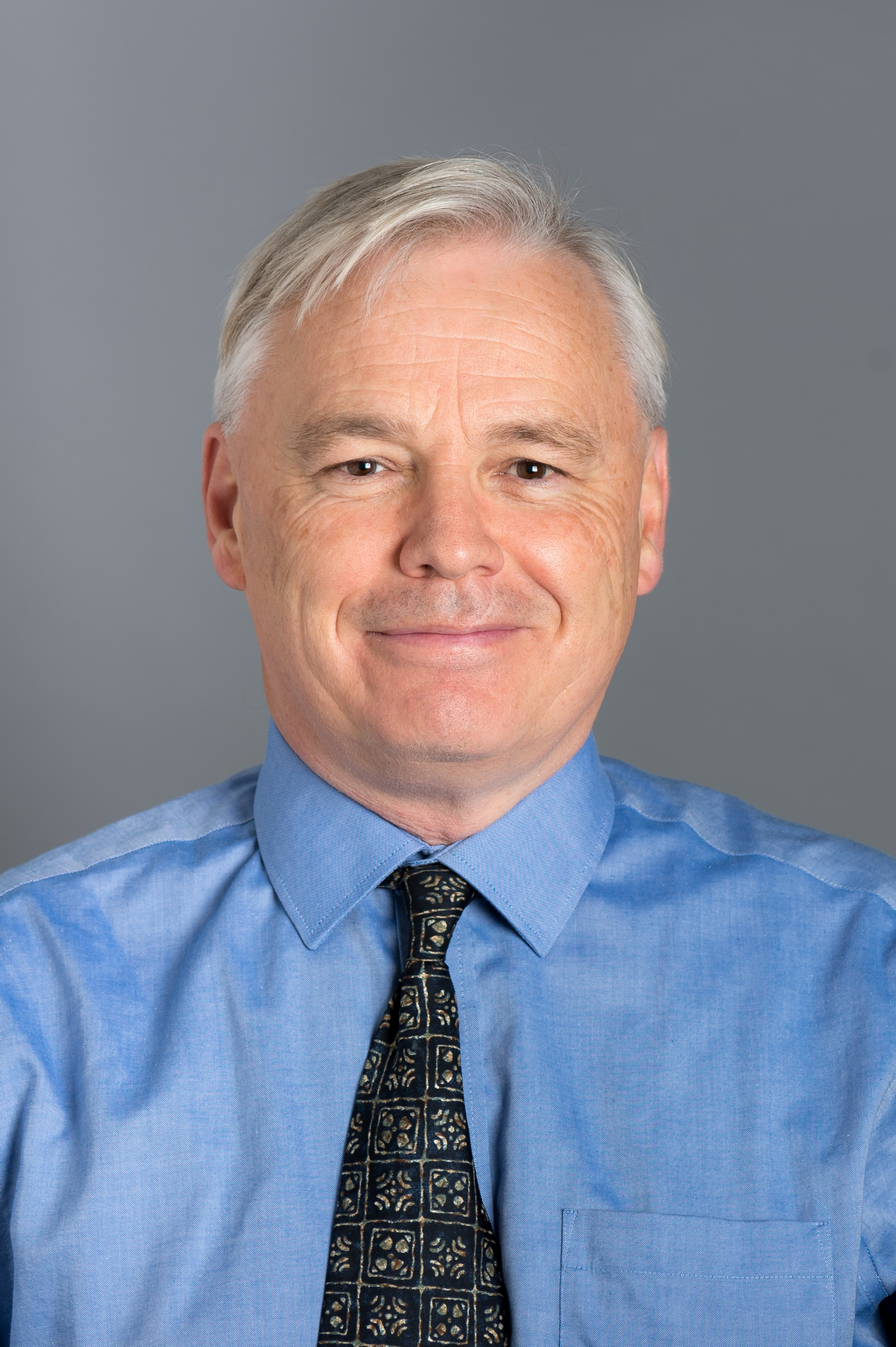
Everington in 2018

Sir Anthony Herbert Everington OBE, known as Sam Everington, is a British General practitioner at a health centre within the Bromley by Bow Centre, in Tower Hamlets, an area of East London.

He has held the role of chair of NHS Tower Hamlets Clinical Commissioning Group since its creation in April 2013. Under his chairmanship Tower Hamlets Clinical Commissioning Group was awarded Clinical Commissioning Group of the year by the Health Service Journal in November 2014. The judges praised the group's "strong leadership, especially clinical leadership, while retaining patient focus".

In 2018, he was appointed to the role of chair of the London Clinical Commissioning Council, London's 32 clinical commissioning group chairs. In 2018, he became a member of the national NHS Property board and was also appointed as an associate non-executive member of the board of NHS Resolution.

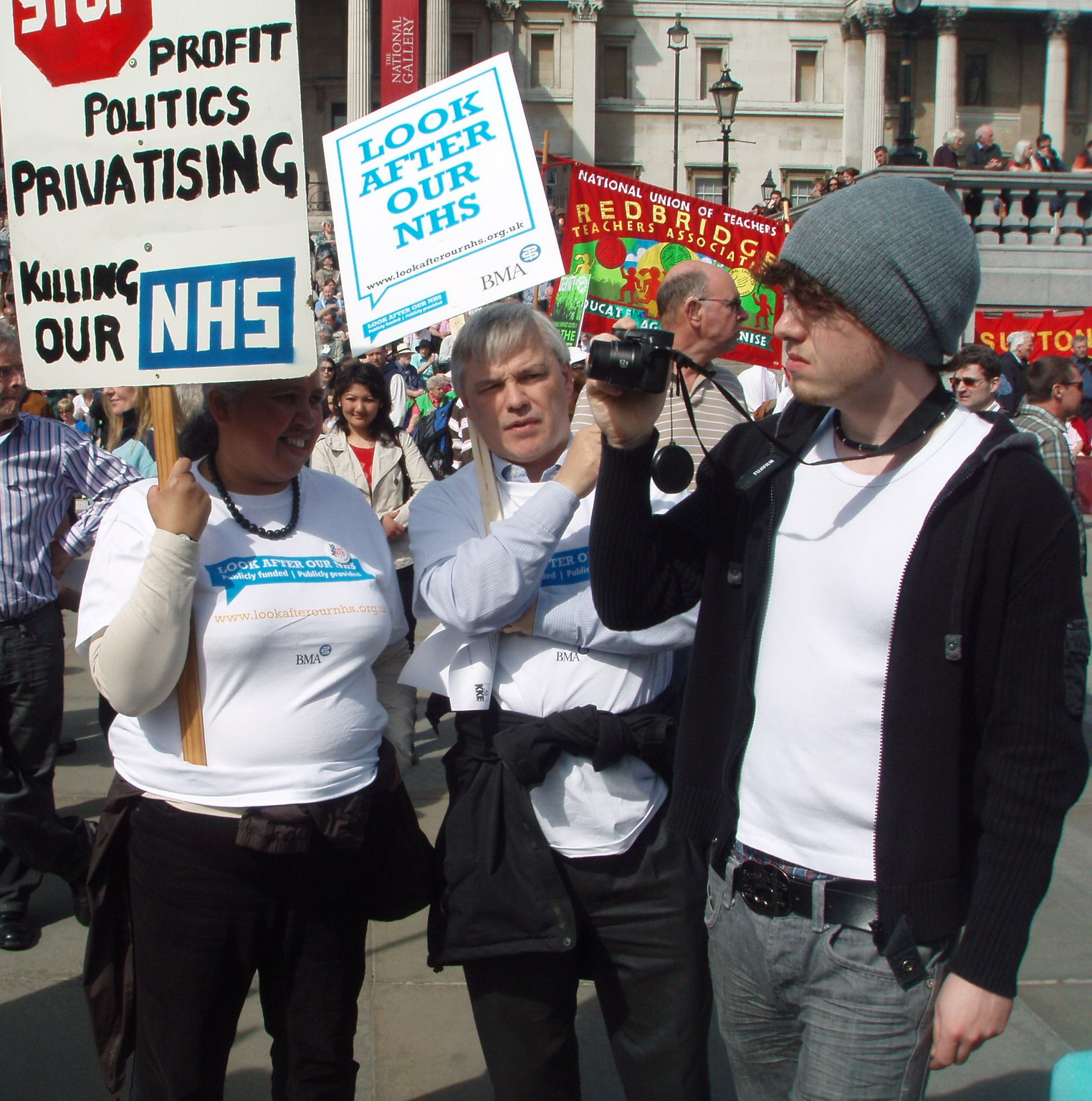
Everington (middle) in 2010

Everington practises at a GP partnership which is part of the Bromley by Bow Centre, an innovative community organisation with more than 100 projects under its roof supporting wider determinants of health. He is an advocate for social prescribing. Considered a founder of the social prescribing movement, he says "...it focuses on what matters to patients. This increases satisfaction, delivers better health outcomes and reduces prescribing and referral costs."

== Training and appointments ==
He studied medicine at Royal Free Hospital School of Medicine from 1979 to 1984. In the 1980s, he made his name as a campaigning junior doctor, highlighting the dangerously long hours that doctors then worked (an average of 84 hours a week). To do this, he slept outside the Royal London Hospital.

In 1989, he became, and continues to be, a council member of the British Medical Association, holding the role of deputy chair from 2004 to 2007.

In 1993, research into racial discrimination in recruitment of medical professionals led Everington and Prof. Aneez Esmail to be arrested and charged with making fraudulent job applications. For research, they applied for vacancies in the name of people with traditional Anglo-Saxon names and Asian names. Each applicant had similar experience and qualifications for the roles. They found that the applications with Anglo-Saxon names were twice as likely to be shortlisted than those with Asian names. Everington and Esmail were cleared of the charges. The research was published in the British Medical Journal. The General Medical Council said that the behaviour was unbecoming of the medical profession – but took no action against the doctors.

The results of the research provided the first documented evidence of discrimination in the NHS. In 1994, both Everington and Esmail received an award from the Campaign for Freedom of Information for this work. Despite this, Everington was appointed as a member of the General Medical Council, a role he held from 2009 to 2012. Everington was one of the first medics on scene at the Tavistock Square bus bombings in 2005.

He was a member of the Department of Health's Art and Health working party in 2006.

He initially backed Andrew Lansley's Health and Social Care health reforms but later reversed his stance. He says that "while clinical commissioning is rightly well supported, the huge re-organisation under the Health and Social Care Act was unnecessary".

He is a former trustee of the King's Fund, appointed in 2014.

Everington is a staunch supporter of physician associates (PAs) within primary care, having been quoted in a 2016 House of Lords Select Committee as being involved in "... setting up a physician associate course" as well as publishing a 2023 opinion piece in the BMJ where he stated he would like PAs to "...go on to train as doctors" and that there was "... no evidence that physician associates make more mistakes". However, a 2025 BMJ systematic review of PA efficacy and safety within UK healthcare between 2015 and 2025 concluded the evidence was "... sparse and of variable quality, and some is outdated" and "... the absence of evidence of safety incidents should not be misinterpreted as evidence that deployment of physician associates and anaesthetic associates is safe".

He became President-elect of the Royal College of General Practitioners in 2025.

== Honours and awards ==
- In 1999, he was appointed an Officer of the Order of the British Empire (OBE) for services to inner city primary care.
- In 2015, he was appointed a Fellow of Queen Mary University.
- In the 2015 New Year Honours, he was appointed a Knight Bachelor for services to primary care.
- In 2015, the Health Service Journal listed him as the 43rd most influential person in the English NHS.
- In 2016, he was appointed Honorary Professor, School of Medicine and Dentistry, Queen Mary University.
