= 30 Euston Square =

Building in Euston Square, London

30 Euston Square, London
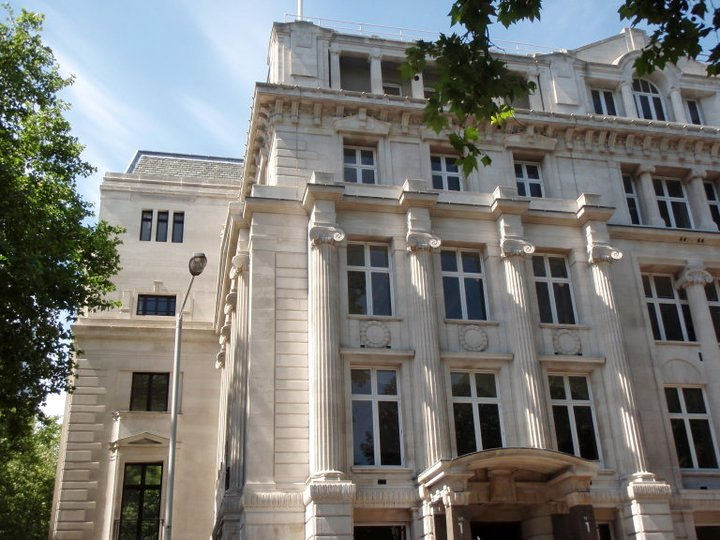

- Location in London
- 51.5267°N 0.1342°W
- Location: Euston Square, London
- OS grid reference: TQ 295 825

History
- Built: 1906–08
- Built for: London, Edinburgh and Glasgow Assurance Company

Site notes
- Architect(s): Arthur Beresford Pite; W. H. Gunton
- Architectural style: Greek Revival
- Governing body: Royal College of General Practitioners

Listed Building – Grade II*
- Designated: 14 May 1974
- Reference no.: 1113131

30 Euston Square is a building located at the corner of Euston Road and Melton Street, London NW1. Originally built as the headquarters of an assurance company, it has since been converted to form the headquarters of the Royal College of General Practitioners (RCGP). Its architectural style is Greek Revival. The first phase, built in 1906–08, was designed by Arthur Beresford Pite, and the 1932 extension is by W. H. Gunton.

== History ==
The original part of the building, with the address 1–9 Melton Street, was constructed in 1906–08 as the headquarters of the London, Edinburgh and Glasgow Assurance Company to a design by Arthur Beresford Pite. In 1910 the insurance company became part of the Pearl Life Assurance Company, which was one of the initial members of the National Amalgamated Approved Society (NAAS). in 1913 Pite extended the roof of the building, and in 1923 he made a further extension to the north end of the building. The final phase of the building, with the address 194–198 Euston Road, was built in 1932 on the south side of the original building; this was designed by W. H. Gunton. The building continued to be the headquarters of the NAAS until approved societies were abolished under the terms of the National Insurance Act 1946. From 1948 it was owned by the government, and subsequently served a number of purposes, including being a local office of the Department of Health and Social Security*. It was transferred to private ownership in the 1990s, but was virtually unused from that time. It was later acquired by the RCGP, and refurbished to act as their headquarters. It opened for this purpose in late October 2012.

== Architecture ==
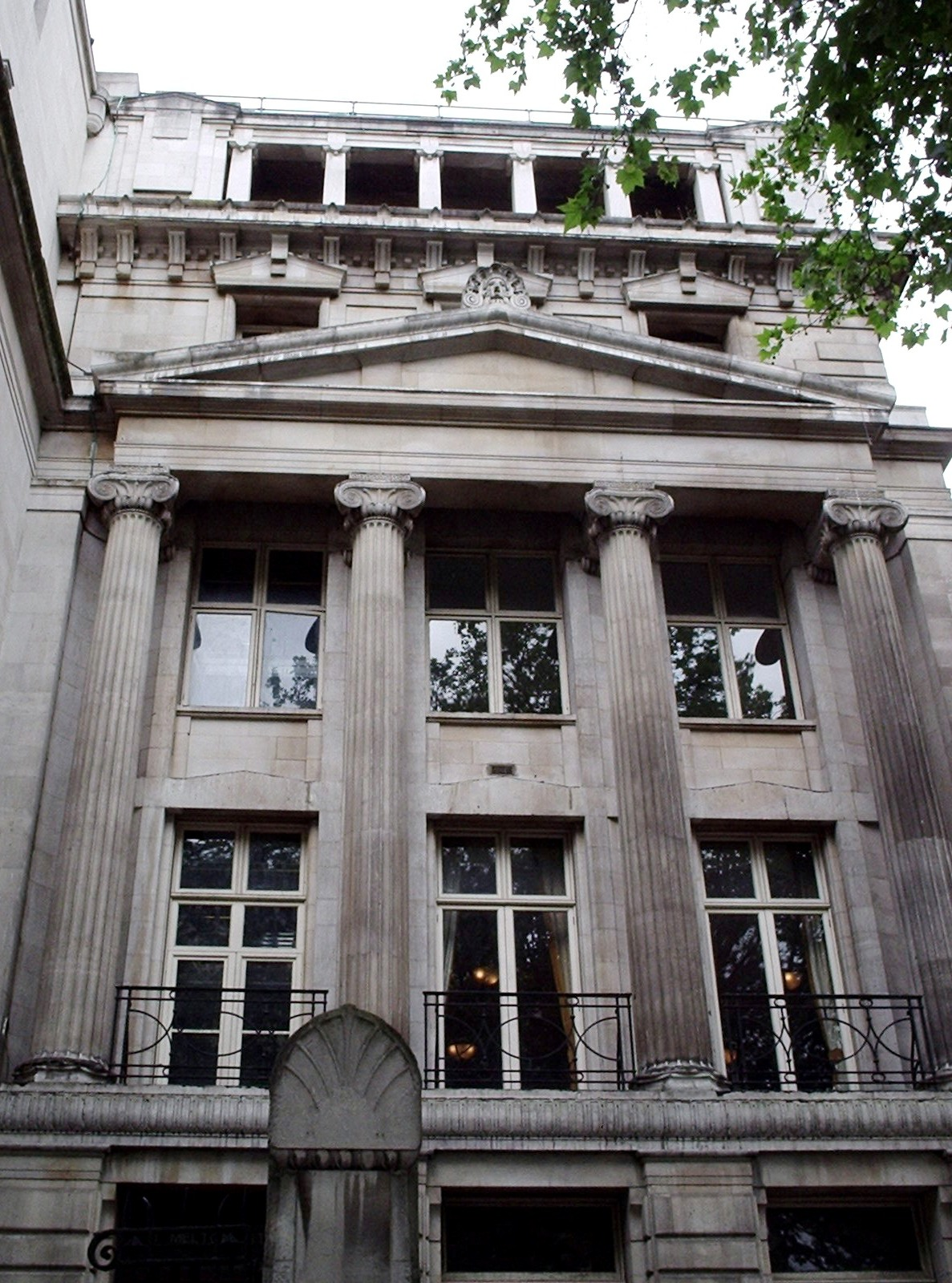
Melton Street front showing Ionic columns

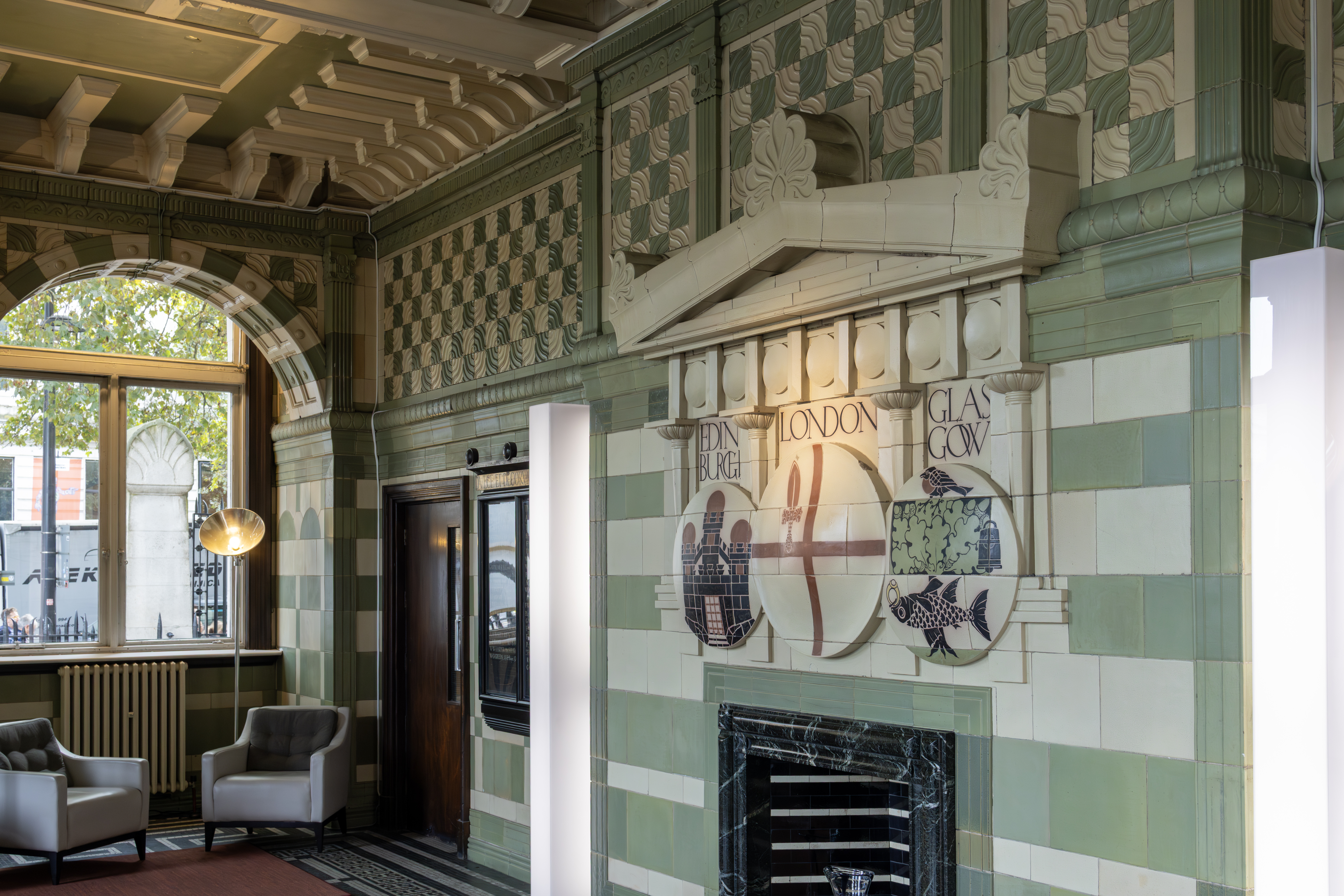
Entrance hall with Doulton tiles

The original building is constructed in load-bearing Portland stone and brick masonry, with slate roofs; the 1932 extension is steel framed with stone cladding. The original building, facing Melton Street, is in four storeys with an attic and basement, the ground floor being rusticated. It is in Greek Revival style, the main front being decorated with a type of Ionic column derived from those at the Temple of Apollo Epicurius at Bassae. The 1932 extension is also in Greek Revival style. The entrance hall is decorated internally with green and cream Doulton Parian Ware tiles. The parts of the building designed by Pite were designated as a Grade II* listed building on 14 May 1974, but Gunton's extension is excluded from the listing.

== Present day ==
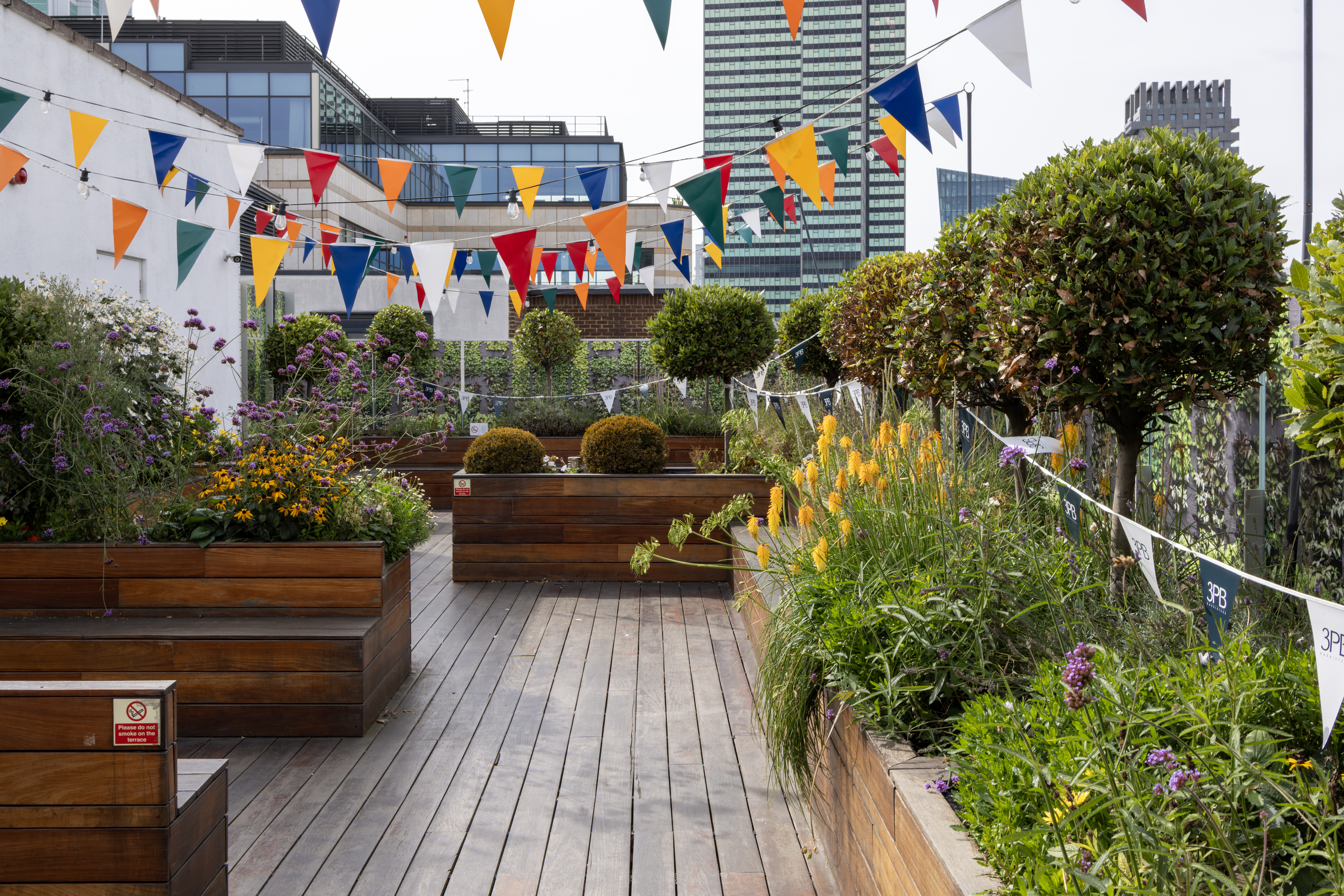
Rooftop terrace

Since coming under the ownership of the RCGP, the entire building has been given the address of 30 Euston Square. Its internal conversion has been carried out to make as little alteration as possible to the 1906–08 phase of the building. The main changes have been in the 1932 phase, where examination suites and study-bedrooms have been created. Other facilities include a 300-seat auditorium with an exhibition area, meeting rooms, private dining rooms and state rooms with a rooftop terrace.
