= Tulketh Mill =

Mill in Preston, Lancashire, England

Coordinates: 53.772°N 2.724°W

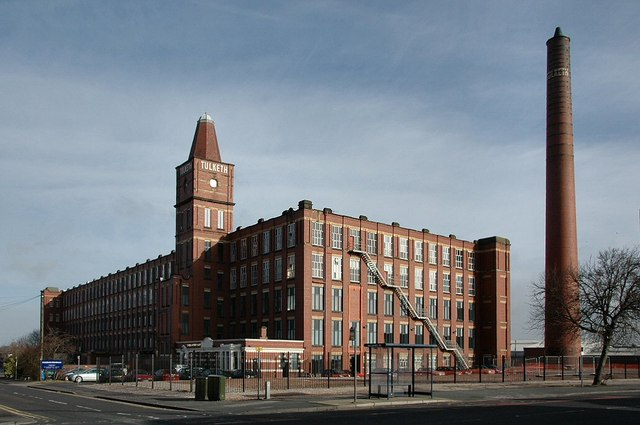
Tulketh Mill in 2008. The chimney was originally taller.

Tulketh Mill is an Edwardian former cotton-spinning mill in Balcarres Road, Tulketh, Preston, Lancashire, England. It was designed by Fred Dixon of Oldham and built for the Tulketh Spinning Company in 1905. It is a Grade II listed building. The building currently houses contact centres and offices for Capita, Dixons Carphone and Hinduja Global Solutions.

== Tulketh Mill, Water Lane ==
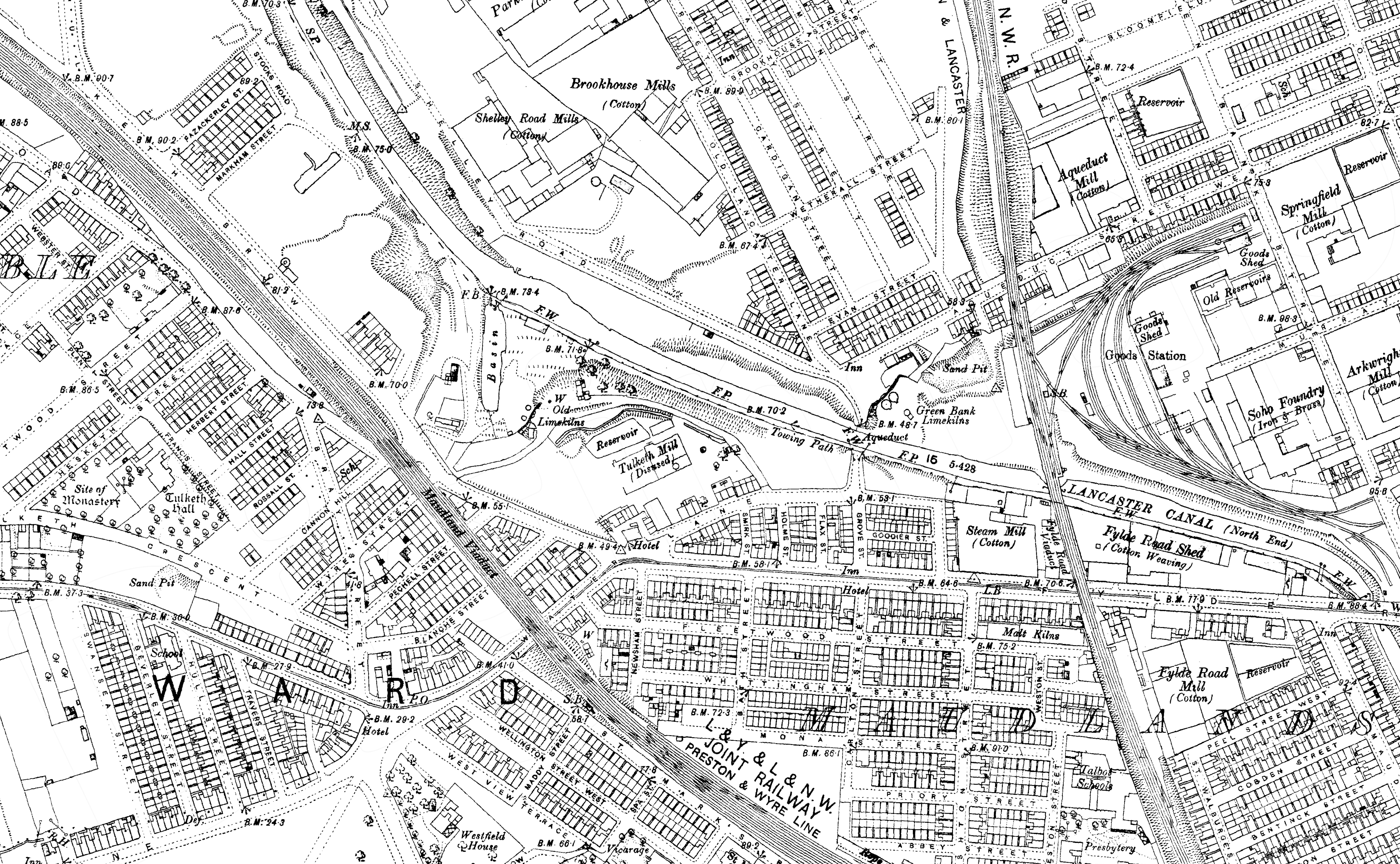
Tulketh Mill in Water Lane (destroyed 1883) (centre) on an 1893 Ordnance Survey map described as "disused".

An earlier Tulketh Mill stood in Water Lane, Preston, until it was destroyed by fire in June 1883.

== See also ==
- List of mills in Preston
