= Shape of Training review =

The Shape of Training was an independent review of postgraduate medical education and training in the United Kingdom, which reported in 2013. The review was undertaken to consider workforce issues, such as the balance between specialisation and generalism in medicine. The review was supported by a range of organisations concerned with medical education and had an independent chair, Professor Sir David Greenaway.

== Background ==
In 2005, Modernising Medical Careers (MMC) had launched, introducing a new style of specialist training across the UK. The independent inquiry into these changes led by John Tooke in 2007 had commented on some of the issues. In 2011, Medical Education England (MEE) scoped themes that could be considered as part of further restructuring of medical training.

The relative lack of generalist training had been highlighted by another advisory group, the NHS Future Forum, who pointed towards the review that would follow.

== The review ==
The Independent Review of the Shape of Medical Training was launched in March 2012 with economist David Greenaway, Vice-Chancellor of The University of Nottingham, appointed as the chair.

The review was jointly sponsored by Academy of Medical Royal Colleges (AoMRC), The Conference of Postgraduate Medical Deans of the UK (COPMeD), the General Medical Council (GMC), Health Education England (HEE), the Medical Schools Council (MSC), NHS Scotland, NHS Wales and Northern Ireland Department of Health, Social Services and Public Safety. Greenaway met with representatives of these organisations on 22 March 2012 and the terms of reference were agreed.

Twelve people were selected to be part of an advisory group, which had the opportunity to consider written and oral submissions from stakeholders, research evidence, site visits, feedback from focus groups and other events. The GMC provided the secretariat.

The initial intention was for the review to report by June 2013. A report was published in October 2013.

== The report ==
The report suggests an argument for changing the structure of training is that there are more patients with a complex mixture of conditions. This means doctors need to have a greater breadth of knowledge, rather than specialising early in their careers, it says.

== Proposals ==
The final report of the review listed 19 recommendations. There were a number of suggestions for the UK governments, including that :

- on leaving medical school, doctors should be allowed to be fully registered to practise, rather than completing a year working under supervision as they do now.
- on completion of their postgraduate training doctors should be awarded a certificate of specialty training, rather than the certificate of completion of training (CCT)
- the length of training for a qualified doctor to become a consultant could be reduced to between six and eight years
- specialties be grouped together under "patient care themes" with common clinical objectives

== Responses ==
Peter Rubin, the chair of the GMC, acknowledged that moving the point of full registration would need further discussion. He also said that there would need to be "some stability in a system that has already been subject to a great deal of change and pressure in recent years."

There were questions raised about transparency and political independence of the review, after details emerged of meetings between the GMC and civil servants from the Department of Health which were not mentioned in the final report.
