= Maureen Baker =

Maureen Baker may refer to:

- Maureen Baker (doctor) (born 1958), Scottish medical doctor
- Maureen Baker (fashion designer) (1920–2017), British fashion designer
- Maureen Baker (sociologist) (born 1948), Canadian–New Zealand sociologist
