= Membership of the Royal Colleges of Physicians of the United Kingdom =

UK professional medical qualification

The Membership of the Royal Colleges of Physicians of the United Kingdom (MRCP(UK)) is a postgraduate medical qualification awarded in the United Kingdom. Administered by the Federation of the Royal Colleges of Physicians. Holders of the MRCP(UK) may apply for collegiate membership of any or all of the three Royal College of Physicians. The qualification replaced the former MRCP(Lon), MRCP(E), and MRCP(G) examinations, while the Membership of the Royal College of Surgeons (MRCS) has similarly become an intercollegiate qualification. The MRCP(UK) is separate from the MRCPI, a postgraduate qualification administered by the Royal College of Physicians of Ireland in Dublin, Ireland.

== History ==
Membership of the Royal Colleges of Physicians of the United Kingdom traces its origins to the separate examination systems developed by the three constituent Royal Colleges in London, Edinburgh, and Glasgow. Following the Medical Act of 1858, which mandated standardized qualifications for medical practice across the UK, the Royal College of Physicians established the first formal membership examination for physicians in 1859. This examination marked a shift toward the rigorous assessment of postgraduate medical knowledge and initially included written and viva voce components to ensure competence in internal medicine. In the late 1960s the need to have a single recognized membership examination throughout the United Kingdom was recognized. Such an examination made it unnecessary for resident doctors to enter several membership examinations and removed the suggestion that the standards of the examination at the three Colleges were different. During the early 1970s, examination centres were established outside the United Kingdom to accommodate international candidates. The written examinations were introduced in a computer-based format in 2011. In 2023, the Practical Assessment of Clinical Examination Skills was revised, with changes to its station structure, including the introduction of focused communication encounters and clinical consultations. The revised format assessed clinical competencies, communication skills, and patient-centred care.

Royal College of Physicians of Edinburgh began conducting membership examinations as early as 1682, shortly after receiving its royal charter in 1681. Initially, these assessments were conducted entirely in Latin through written papers. Over the centuries, the examinations evolved to incorporate clinical patient assessments by the nineteenth century, emphasizing practical diagnostic skills. Similarly, the Royal Faculty of Physicians and Surgeons of Glasgow, which later became the Royal College, introduced formal membership qualifications in 1883. This development aligned with post–Medical Act reforms and provided a recognized diploma in medicine and surgery, thereby helping to regulate physician training in Scotland. Each college’s system developed independently, reflecting regional medical traditions while maintaining high standards for entry into specialist practice.

== Structure ==
The MRCP(UK) examination is administered by the Federation of the Royal Colleges of Physicians of the United Kingdom, comprising the Royal College of Physicians of London, the Royal College of Physicians of Edinburgh and the Royal College of Physicians and Surgeons of Glasgow.

The MRCP(UK) examination consists of three components, the Part One Written Examination, the Part Two Written Examination, and the Part Two Clinical Examination, commonly known as PACES. Candidates must pass all three components to obtain the MRCP(UK) diploma. A pass in the Part One Written Examination is required before a candidate may attempt either the Part Two Written Examination or PACES, although passing the Part Two Written Examination is not a prerequisite for attempting PACES. There are several online platforms, such as Educarequiz, provide MRCP(UK) preparation resources. These resources help candidates study efficiently and become familiar with the examination format.

=== Written Examination ===
The MRCP(UK) written examinations have two parts. Part One tests basic medical knowledge, common diseases and clinical information through two computer-based papers with 100 questions each. Part Two focuses on applying medical knowledge to clinical cases, including diagnosis, investigations and management, and also has two papers with 100 questions each. Both exams have no negative marking, and candidates receive one mark for each correct answer. The pass marks from the 2026/1 diet are 450 for Part One and 444 for Part Two.

=== PACES ===
The Practical Assessment of Clinical Examination Skills (PACES) is the clinical component of the MRCP(UK) Part two examination. It assesses candidates’ ability to examine patients, recognize clinical signs, communicate effectively, make diagnoses, use clinical judgement, address patients’ concerns, and maintain patient safety.

The current format, PACES23, consists of five stations and eight patient encounters completed in 125 minutes. Candidates rotate through communication tasks, physical examinations, and acute or chronic clinical consultations involving real patients or trained actors. Each station is assessed by two examiners using a structured scoring system. Candidates must achieve an overall score of at least 126 out of 168 and pass all seven core skills. To sit PACES, candidates must have passed MRCP(UK) Part 1 and completed at least 12 months of postgraduate medical experience. Passing both PACES and the Part two Written examination is required for the full MRCP (UK) diploma.

== Exam centres ==
MRCP(UK) examinations are held at dedicated centres in the UK and overseas. In the UK, the main centres are London, Edinburgh, and Glasgow, offering two parts and PACES. Additional PACES centres are available in Aberdeen, Birmingham, Manchester, Newcastle, and Oxford. PACES is usually conducted several times a year. Venue selection for MRCP(UK) examinations follows rigorous standards to ensure quality and fairness. Facilities must provide secure, controlled environments that comply with General Medical Council requirements for clinical assessments. They must also have adequate infection-control measures and appropriate clinical resources for PACES.

Internationally, MRCP(UK) exams are available in more than 20 countries, including UAE, Pakistan, Singapore, Hong Kong, Malaysia, India, Sri Lanka, Egypt, Kenya, Kuwait, Oman, Qatar, Saudi Arabia, and Sudan. Written exams may be taken at approved test centres or through remote online proctoring, while PACES is held in hospitals and clinical facilities. International fees are generally higher than UK fees, and places at popular centres may be limited, resulting in waiting lists.

At present, the total examination cost is approximately £1,495 if all parts are taken in the UK and £2,390 if they are taken overseas. These amounts assume that each examination is passed on the first attempt and do not include preparation courses. Candidates may also use training courses, online revision websites, and mobile applications to improve their chances of passing.

== See also ==
- Medical education in the United Kingdom
- List of medical schools in the United Kingdom
- Internal medicine
- Postgraduate Medical Education and Training Board
- Royal College of Physicians
