= Carrie MacEwen =

British surgeon

Dame Carrie MacEwen DBE FRCS FRCPE FRCGP
- Born: Caroline Jan MacEwen; December 1958 (age 67)
- Education: University of Dundee
- Children: 3

Dame Caroline Jan MacEwen DBE FRCS FRCPE FRCGP, known as Carrie MacEwen, is a British ophthalmology consultant who has served as the chair of the General Medical Council (GMC) since May 2022. She was previously acting chair of the GMC between August 2021 and May 2022, the chair of the Academy of Medical Royal Colleges between 2017 and 2020 and the president of the Royal College of Ophthalmologists (RCOphth) between 2014 and 2017.

== Career ==
MacEwen was born and grew up in Glasgow, Scotland. Her father was an ophthalmology consultant and she cites him as her inspiration for her career. MacEwen has three brothers. She studied medicine at the University of Dundee, graduating in 1981. MacEwen specialised in ophthalmology and has been a consultant since 1996. She works as a consultant at the Ninewells Hospital, NHS Tayside in Dundee and is an Honorary Professor of Ophthalmology at the University of Dundee School of Medicine. Her research is focused on paediatric ophthalmology, ocular trauma, sports ophthalmology and disorders of eye movement. MacEwen was the chair of the Healthcare Quality Improvement Partnership, ophthalmology specialty adviser to the Chief Medical Officer for Scotland, co-clinical lead for the ophthalmology workstream of the Getting It Right First Time programme in England, and Associate Dean for less than full time training for East Scotland. She stated her support for assisted suicide in 2015.

While president of the RCOphth, MacEwen helped to develop the Ophthalmic Common Clinical Competency Framework and commissioned The Way Forward. The former, published in 2016, sets the standards and guidance for the knowledge and skills required for non-medical healthcare professionals to deliver patient care. The latter, published in 2017, aimed to share best practice to facilitate local service redesign. She was the chair of the Academy of Medical Royal Colleges between 2017 and 2020. In this role, MacEwen, in an interview with The Times in February 2020, urged doctors to take responsibility in leading improvements in patient care and not "sit on their hands" and blame the government alone. She suggested an example of this was if an IT problem was delaying patient care in a clinic then doctors should arrange for this to be fixed.

MacEwen served as acting chair of the General Medical Council (GMC) between August 2021 and May 2022 before being appointed as the chair by the Privy Council. She is the second woman, after Clare Marx, to hold the position since its founding in 1858. In a speech at the Royal College of Physicians and Surgeons of Glasgow in October 2021, she set out the GMC's vision on how they would help to improve doctors' wellbeing with a shift from "stepping in when things go wrong to fostering supportive environments that stop harm from happening in the first place". MacEwen said that the GMC would do this by conducting more research and data collection and further development of their equality, diversity, and inclusion programme. She would also aim to reduce disproportionality between BME and white doctors in fitness-to-practice referrals by employers and attainment in undergraduate and postgraduate education. MacEwen oversaw the consultation on the review of Good Medical Practice, the main guidance document for UK doctors' standards, in 2022, which was updated in January 2024. The document was updated again in December 2024 to also apply to physician associates and anaesthesia associates after the GMC started regulation of those professions.

== Personal life ==
She is married to a fellow doctor and has three children.

== Honours ==
Fellow of:

- British and Irish Orthoptic Society (Honorary), College of Optometrists (Honorary),Faculty of Medical Leadership and Management (Senior Fellow)
- Faculty of Public Health (Honorary), Faculty of Sport and Exercise Medicine UK (Honorary), Royal College of General Practitioners (Honorary)
- Royal College of Ophthalmologists (Honorary/Past President), Royal College of Pathologists (Honorary), Royal College of Physicians of Edinburgh, Royal College of Physicians and Surgeons of Glasgow (Honorary), Royal Society of Edinburgh
- Worshipful Company of Barbers (Honorary Freeman)

She was appointed Dame Commander of the Order of the British Empire (DBE) in the 2021 Birthday Honours for services to ophthalmology and healthcare leadership during the COVID-19 pandemic.

Academic offices
Preceded by Harminder Dua	President of the Royal College of Ophthalmologists; 2014–2017	Succeeded by Mike Burdon
