= Kamila Hawthorne =

Welsh medical academic and doctor

Professor Kamila Hawthorne MBE FRCGP FRCP FLSW
- Education: Somerville College, Oxford
- Medical career
- Profession: Doctor
- Field: General Practitioner
- Institutions: Cardiff University School of Medicine; University of Surrey; Swansea University

Kamila Hawthorne MBE is a Welsh medical academic and a general practitioner. She has been a clinical professor of Medical Education, and Associate Dean for Medicine. She was Chair of the Royal College of General Practitioners (RCGP) 2022–2025, having previously been Vice Chair (Professional Development) 2015–2018.

== Early life and education ==
Hawthorne was born in Edinburgh and brought up in Dar-Es-Salaam, Tanzania before moving to the UK. She qualified in medicine from Somerville College, Oxford in 1984, then completed her GP training in Nottingham in 1988.

== Career ==
Hawthorne's clinical work in Butetown served a deprived area of Cardiff's docks.

She has taught medical students since 1991 and an examiner for the Membership of the Royal College of General Practitioners (MRCGP) since 1997.

Hawthorne was Vice Chair (Professional Development) at the Royal College of General Practitioners 2015–2018.

She was a Professor of Medical Education at Cardiff University School of Medicine, later becoming the Head of the Graduate Entry Medicine Programme at Swansea University.

In February 2025, she was appointed Chair of the trustee board of the National Academy for Social Prescribing. She is a trustee of the King's Fund. and a former trustee of the RCGP. She was co-opted as a trustee to the Faculty of Medical Leadership and Management.

== Honours ==
Hawthorne became a Fellow of the Royal College of General Practitioners in 2001, and Fellow of the Academy of Medical Educators in 2013. She was made a Member of the Order of the British Empire (MBE) in the 2017 New Year Honours for services to general practice.

Hawthorne was elected a Fellow of the Learned Society of Wales in 2022.

In 2025, she was made an Honorary Fellow of her alma mater, Somerville College, Oxford.
