= Peter Rubin =

British physician (born 1948)

Sir Peter Charles Rubin
- Born: 21 November 1948 (age 77)
- Occupation: Physician

Sir Peter Charles Rubin (born 21 November 1948) is a British doctor and was the Chair of the General Medical Council (GMC) of the United Kingdom from 2009–2014.

A consultant physician and professor of therapeutics at the University of Nottingham since 1987, he has an interest in medical problems that may occur in pregnancy. He served as chairman of several Medical Research Council committees investigating drug research in pregnancy. He was the first member of his family to attend university.

== Healthcare education ==
Rubin chaired a number of committees devoted to education, such as the GMC's Education Committee from 2005 to 2008 and the Postgraduate Medical Education and Training Board (PMETB) in the same years. He served as a board member of the Higher Education Funding Council for England from 2003-2009 and co-chaired one of their committees that recommended the establishment of a new dental school in the South West of the country.

He was the dean of the Faculty of Medicine and Health Sciences at the University of Nottingham between 1997 and 2003. During his time as dean he helped to develop both the university's Graduate Entry Medical School, which opened in 2004, and the School of Veterinary Medicine and Science, which opened in 2006 as the first new veterinary school in the UK for more than half a century.

== General Medical Council ==
Rubin was appointed to the council of the GMC, beginning on 1 January 2009. He was appointed to the position of Chair and his tenure began on 20 April 2009 when he replaced Professor Sir Graeme Catto. While he held this office he continued to work as a practising doctor in Nottingham. In 2012 the process of selecting the chair was changed and he became the first chair to be appointed. He was succeeded by Terence Stephenson on 1 January 2015.

== Honours ==
In 2010 he was conferred as an honorary Fellow of the Academy of Medical Educators. Rubin was knighted for services to medicine in the 2010 Queen's Birthday Honours. In 2004 he was awarded an honorary degree by the University of Lincoln. In 2011 he was awarded an Honorary Doctorate of Science from University of Exeter. In 2012 he was awarded an Honorary Doctorate of Health from Plymouth University.
