= Alexandre Kalache =

Alexandre Kalache may refer to:

- Alexandre Kalache (epidemiologist)
- Alexandre Kalache (volleyball)
