= NHS Providers =

Health provider membership organization in England

NHS Providers is the membership organisation for NHS trusts in England, which takes part in negotiations between the trusts and the Department of Health and provides development support to trust leaders.

Until 2011, the body was a section of the NHS Confederation. Claiming 100% of trusts and foundation trusts in England as members, NHS Providers is overseen by a board of 20 trust chiefs. Its member bodies include NHS hospitals alongside mental health, community and ambulance services.

== Key people ==
=== Chief executive ===
- 2022 to February 2023: Saffron Cordery (interim appointment, previously deputy chief executive)
- February 2023 to November 2024: Julian Hartley, previously chief executive of Leeds Teaching Hospitals NHS Trust
- December 2024 to May 2025: Saffron Cordery (interim)
- From May 2025: Daniel Elkeles, previously chief executive at London Ambulance Service NHS Trust

=== Chair ===
- 2014–2019: Gillian Morgan
- 2019–2025: Ron Kerr, previously chief executive of Guy's and St Thomas' NHS Foundation Trust
- From February 2025: Terence Stephenson, chair of the Health Research Authority

== See also ==
- NHS Confederation – represents organisations that commission and provide NHS services
- NHS Employers – negotiates contracts with healthcare staff
