= Helen Stokes-Lampard =

British medical academic and general practitioner

Dame Helen Stokes-Lampard DBE FRCGP
- Born: Helen Jayne Stokes; October 1970 (age 55–56); Carmarthen, Wales
- Citizenship: UK
- Education: St George's Hospital Medical School; University of Birmingham
- Years active: 1996–present
- Known for: Chair of the RCGP
- Medical career
- Profession: Physician
- Field: General Practitioner
- Research: Women's health

Dame Helen Jayne Stokes-Lampard DBE FRCGP, FLSW (born October 1970) is a British medical academic and a general practitioner. She is the Chair of the Academy of Medical Royal Colleges (AoMRC) a GP principal and Chair of the National Academy for Social Prescribing (NASP). She was Chair of the Royal College of General Practitioners (RCGP) from November 2016 to November 2019. She is also a professor of GP Education at Birmingham University and holds a visiting chair at St George's, University of London.

== Early life ==
Helen Jayne Stokes was born in October 1970 in Carmarthen, Wales the daughter of a headmaster. She grew up in Swansea, South Wales. She qualified in medicine in 1996 from St George's Hospital Medical School, London, where she was president of the Students' Union.

== Career ==
She began working at the University of Birmingham's Department of Primary Care in 2000, while she was a GP registrar. She gained a PhD in 2009. The subject of her PhD was Variation in NHS Utilisation of Vault Cytology Tests in Women post-hysterectomy. She was Head of Primary Care (undergraduate) in the Medical School of the University of Birmingham until becoming RCGP Chair.

She is a GP partner practising in Lichfield, Staffordshire. Prior to training as a GP, she worked in obstetrics and gynaecology for several years, and this experience shaped her clinical and academic aspirations. She was a personal mentor for doctors in difficulty in the Midlands until 2016, a scheme supported by the West Midlands Deanery and RCGP Midland Faculty.

In 2012 she became the RCGP's first female honorary treasurer. She was also a Governor at the Birmingham Women's NHS Foundation Trust, until October 2017.

In 2016, she was one of four candidates who stood to succeed Maureen Baker as chair of the RCGP Council. In July, the college announced that Stokes-Lampard had been elected as the next RCGP chair, and would take up appointment in November 2016. She became Chair of the Royal College of General Practitioners on 19 November 2016.

In 2016, in her first year as Chair of the RCGP she led policy papers on sexual and reproductive health - Time to Act and the college's first annual assessment of the GP Forward View She has spoken publicly about the adverse impacts of social isolation and loneliness on the health of the population and how it is akin to a long-term chronic condition. Her term of office as Chair of the RCGP Council ended in November 2019. She was succeeded by Professor Martin Marshall.

In October 2019, her appointment was announced as head of the new National Academy for Social Prescribing.

In July 2020, she became chair of the Academy of Medical Royal Colleges for a three-year term, succeeding Carrie MacEwen.

In June 2024, she was appointed to the position of Chief Medical Officer for Health New Zealand - (Te Whatu Ora) , the national public healthcare system of New Zealand, which replaced the country's 20 District Health Boards in 2022.

== Honours ==
Stokes-Lampard was elected as a Fellow of the Learned Society of Wales in 2021.

Stokes-Lampard was appointed Dame Commander of the Order of the British Empire (DBE) in the 2022 New Year Honours for services to general practice.
