= Terence Stephenson =

Northern Irish doctor

Sir Terence Stephenson FRCP
- Born: Terence John Stephenson; December 1957 (age 67); Larne, County Antrim, Northern Ireland
- Education: University of Bristol; Imperial College London; University of Oxford; University of Nottingham
- Known for: Chair of the Health Research Authority
- Medical career
- Profession: Doctor
- Field: Paediatrics

Sir Terence John Stephenson, FRCP (born December 1957) is a Northern Irish consultant paediatric doctor and chair of the Health Research Authority (HRA). He is also the Nuffield Professor of Child Health at University College London (UCL) and chair of NHS Providers.

== Early life ==
He was born in Larne, County Antrim, Northern Ireland. He was educated at Larne Grammar School. He attended the University of Bristol, Imperial College London, University of Oxford and University of Nottingham.

== Career ==
Stephenson was dean of the Medical School and Professor of Child Health at the University of Nottingham from 2003 to 2009. In 2009 he became the Nuffield Professor of Child Health at UCL Great Ormond Street Institute of Child Health. He was President of the Royal College of Paediatrics and Child Health from April 2009 until May 2012; in 2011 the college published ten national standards, Facing the Future: Standards for Paediatric Services. This was the first time the college committed to a set of standards for all children receiving inpatient care or assessment across the UK.

He then took up the role of chair of the Academy of Medical Royal Colleges in July 2012.

He became a member of the General Medical Council in 2009. In September 2014 it was announced that he would become the chair of the GMC, succeeding Peter Rubin on 1 January 2015.

In October 2014 it was announced that he had been appointed as a panel member for the Independent Panel Inquiry into Child Sexual Abuse.

In September 2019 he was appointed chair of the Health Research Authority, succeeding Professor Sir Jonathan Montgomery.

In April 2020 he was appointed as a vice-president of The Academy of Experts.

He has co-authored textbooks, written invited chapters and editorials, and published more than 150 peer-reviewed papers in academic journals. He has been described as leading by example.

Throughout 2021 and 2022, Stephenson researched the effects of COVID-19 on British teenagers in a study named CLoCk (Children & young people with Long Covid).

Since February 2025, he has been the chair of NHS Providers.

== Awards and honours ==
By March 2016, ten honorary fellowships had been bestowed on Stephenson from colleges in the UK, Ireland, Hong Kong and Australia. In November 2014 he received an honorary fellowship from the Royal College of General Practitioners. In May 2015 he was elected a fellow of the Faculty of Pain Medicine.

Stephenson was appointed a Knight Bachelor in the 2018 New Year Honours for services to Healthcare and Children's Health Services.

Professional and academic associations
Preceded by Patricia Hamilton	President of the Royal College of Paediatrics and Child Health; 2009 to 2012	Succeeded by Hilary Cass
Preceded by Sir Neil Douglas	Chair of the Academy of Medical Royal Colleges; 2012 to 2015	Succeeded by Dame Susan Bailey
