= John Bligh =

John Bligh may refer to:

- John Bligh, 1st Earl of Darnley (1687–1728), Irish MP for Trim and for Athboy 1713–1721
- John Bligh, 3rd Earl of Darnley (1719–1781), his son, Irish MP for Athboy 1739–1747, British MP for Maidstone
- John Bligh, 4th Earl of Darnley (1767–1831), his son, British peer and cricketer
- John Bligh, 6th Earl of Darnley (1827–1896), British peer
- John Duncan Bligh (1798–1872), his son, British envoy to Sweden and Hanover
- John Bligh (medical educator), British doctor and medical educator
- John Bligh (Royal Navy officer) (1770–1831), British naval officer
- John O'Connell Bligh (1834–1880), Native Police officer in the British colonies of New South Wales and Queensland
