= Postgraduate Medical Education and Training Board =

The Postgraduate Medical Education and Training Board (PMETB, also PGME) was the non-departmental public body responsible for postgraduate medical education and training in the United Kingdom (UK). The General Medical Council (GMC) took over the functions of PMETB on 1 April 2010 when the two organisations merged.

== PMETB - 2005 - 30 March 2010 ==
PMETB ensured that postgraduate training for doctors was of the highest standard. It was accountable to the Parliament of the United Kingdom and acted independently of government. GPs and specialists within the National Health Service (NHS) or working privately in England had to comply with the standards it established. PMETB in conjunction with COPMeD ran an annual UK-wide survey of trainee doctors.

PMETB was established by The General and Specialist Medical Practice (Education, Training and Qualifications) Order 2003 ("the Order") to develop a single, unifying framework for postgraduate medical education and training and began operating on 30 September 2005. It took over the responsibilities of the Specialist Training Authority of the medical royal colleges and the Joint Committee on Postgraduate General Practice Training.

== Certificate of Completion of Training (CCT) ==
A Certificate of Completion of Training (CCT) or GPCCT (for GPs) is awarded to doctors who have successfully followed and completed a PMETB approved curriculum in a PMETB approved training programme.

== CESRs and CEGPRs ==
PMETB developed and introduced a system that assesses applications from doctors who have not followed a traditional training programme but who may have gained the same level of skills and knowledge as CCT holders. Prior to their establishment, there were only very limited ways for these doctors to join the specialist or GP registers, with consequent limitations to their career development.

=== Certificate of Eligibility for Specialist Registration (CESR) ===
Doctors who wish to join the specialist register and have not followed a full General Medical Council approved training programme can apply under Article 8(2) of The General and Specialist Medical Practice Order for a Certificate confirming Eligibility for Specialist Registration (CESR).

=== Certificate confirming Eligibility for General Practice Registration (CEGPR) ===
GPs who have not followed a PMETB approved training programme can apply under Article 11 of the Order for a Certificate confirming Eligibility for General Practice Registration (CEGPR).

== Achievements ==
PMETB's website lists its achievements since 2008. These include:

- publishing the first-ever generic standards for postgraduate training across all medical specialties: bringing consistency and greater transparency to the postgraduate training of doctors.
- approving curricula for all 57 specialties, plus 33 sub-specialties, against new standards for curricula drawn up by PMETB.
- developing and introducing new equivalence routes to specialist registration. Prior to PMETB's establishment there were limited pathways for doctors who had not followed a traditional training programme to join the Specialist or GP Registers. Consequently, their career development opportunities were limited.

== Criticism ==
In the past, PMETB was criticised by some medical royal colleges for adding bureaucracy, poor communication and a lack of robustness in its regulation of postgraduate medical training. Many of these problems relate to the initial stages of the Board's operation and came to a head in summer 2007. The Board's relationships with the medical royal colleges subsequently improved with a new contract signed between the two bodies which dealt with concerns the medical royal colleges had about the funding of their work.

== Merger with the General Medical Council ==
In February 2008 the Secretary of State for Health, Alan Johnson, agreed with recommendations of the Tooke Report which advised that PMETB should merge with the General Medical Council (GMC). Whilst recognising the achievements made by PMETB, Professor John Tooke concluded that regulation needed to be combined into one body; that there should be one organisation that looked after what he called 'the continuum of medical education', from the moment someone chooses a career in medicine until the point that they retire.

New legislation transferred PMETB’s regulatory responsibilities to the GMC, including all of the certificates that PMETB were issuing at the time:

- Award of a Certificate of Completion of Training (CCT);
- Applications for inclusion on the General Practitioner or Specialist Register; and
- Certificate of Eligibility for Specialist Registration (CESR) and Certificate of Eligibility for General Practice Registration (CEGPR)
- Certificates of acquired rights.

The merger, which took place on 1 April 2010, was welcomed by both PMETB and the GMC.
