= Martin Marshall =

British medical academic and a general practitioner

Martin Marshall CBE (born 2 September 1961) is a British medical academic and a general practitioner. He was chair of the Royal College of General Practitioners (RCGP) from 2019 until 2022. He works as a GP in Newham, East London.

== Career ==
He was appointed as a deputy Chief Medical Officer (CMO) for England in March 2006, In late 2007 he left this post and was director of clinical quality of the Health Foundation.

In October 2016 he was elected as the RCGP's Vice Chair for External Affairs. In July 2019, he became the Chair elect of the RCGP council, to succeed Helen Stokes-Lampard. In November 2019 he took up role of Chair of RCGP for a three year term. He also holds a Professorship in Health Care Improvement at University College London.

Marshall was also a 1998-1999 Harkness Fellow, spending a year researching health policy in the United States.

== Awards and honours ==
He was appointed a Commander of the Order of the British Empire (CBE) for services to healthcare in the 2005 Birthday Honours.

He received the John Fry Award and the James MacKenzie Award, from the Royal College of General Practitioners for contribution to research, in 2005 and 2008 respectively.
