= Alexandre Kalache (epidemiologist) =

Medical epidemiologist (born 1945)

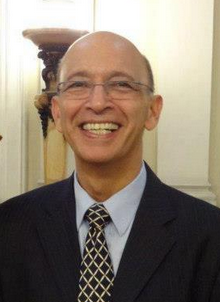

President of the International Longevity Centre Brasil (ILC BR)

Personal details
- Born: Rio de Janeiro, Brazil
- Education: Federal University of Rio de Janeiro (MD); University of London (MSc, PhD)
- Profession: Medical doctor
- Website: www.ilcbrazil.org

Alexandre Kalache (born 17 October 1945) is a medical epidemiologist specializing in the study of aging. Since 2012 he is President of the International Longevity Centre-Brazil (ILC BR) and co-President of the Global Alliance of International Longevity Centres (ILC-GA) from 2014 - 2019. He formerly directed the World Health Organization global ageing programme at its Geneva headquarters following an academic career largely at the Universities of London and Oxford in the United Kingdom. Kalache has researched, written and spoken in the field of ageing issues as an academic, an international civil servant and an advocate.

== Early life and education ==
Kalache was born into a multicultural family with an immigrant father and grandparents in Rio de Janeiro, Brazil. He grew up in Copacabana.

Kalache graduated from the medical school of the Federal University of Rio de Janeiro with distinction in 1970. He gained diplomas in infectious and parasitic diseases (1971-2) and medical education (1973). He was awarded a master's degree in social medicine with distinction from the London School of Hygiene and Tropical Medicine (LSHTM) in 1977. He was awarded his PhD in epidemiology by the University of London, UK in 1993.

== Professional life ==
Kalache became a member of the Royal College of Physicians (UK), Faculty of Community Medicine in 1984. He became an assistant professor, teaching geriatrics at Oxford University, and studied the global nature of population ageing.

He was named a Fellow of the International Association of Geriatrics and Gerontology in 1987, and a Fellow of the International Epidemiological Association in 1989.

In 1994 Kalache became a director of the World Health Organization. In 2000 he led a two-year international committee to define existing policy on population ageing, resulting in the publication of Active Ageing, a Policy Framework, released at the United Nations' World Assembly on Ageing in Madrid in 2002. Kalache became a Fellow the World Economic Forum in 1999, and a Fellow of the Aspen Institute in Colorado, USA, in 2003.

Kalache headed a WHO global project in 2006-7 to identify the key elements of an “age-friendly” city. The resulting assessment tool for use by city planners and advocacy groups, Global Age-Friendly Cities: a Guide was released on the International Day of Older Persons in 2007. In 2007 he was retired from his WHO position because of his age.

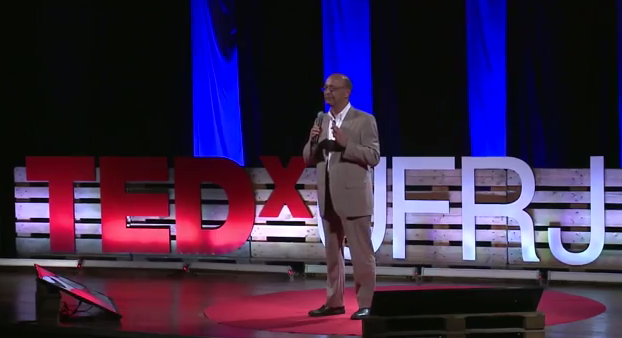
Alexandre Kalache at TEDxUFRJ

In 2009, Kalache was appointed senior policy advisor to the president on global aging, New York Academy of Medicine (NYAM), New York, US. He was an additional representative to the United Nations for the International Association of Gerontology and Geriatrics, and also became a global ambassador to HelpAge International.

In 2010 Kalache was appointed research chair professor in elderly health care development at King Saud University in Riyadh, Saudi Arabia. In 2011 he became an associate professor at the Andalusian School of Public Health in Granada, Spain, and was a member of the Brazilian delegation to the United Nations' Open-Ended Working Group on the Human Rights of Older People.

In 2012 Kalache founded and became the inaugural president of the International Longevity Centre - Brazil (ILC-BR), an independent think tank based in Rio de Janeiro that develops and promotes policy related to population ageing. In the same year he was appointed as thinker-in-residence to the South Australian State Government and adjunct professor at the University of South Australia and became a TEDx speaker. In 2015 he was additionally elected as co-president of the sixteen-country consortium of the Global Alliance of ILCs.

== Personal ==
He is a multi-linguist, pianist and chef. He has an adult son and daughter and two grandchildren.

== Appointments and memberships ==
Kalache has acted as special adviser to numerous organisations, including the Matia Foundation of Spain, the Gulbenkian Foundation of Portugal, the Robert Wood Johnson Foundation of the US and the Robert Marinho Foundation of Brazil. He has been an adviser to the World Bank, the International Association of Geriatrics and Gerontology, the Brazilian and Spanish Ministries of Health, the Rio de Janeiro Municipal Government, the São Paulo State Secretary of Social Policy, Bradesco Seguros, the Brazilian Special Secretary of Human Rights and the Global Coalition of NGOs for the Human Rights of Older Persons.

Kalache has served on many boards from the World Economic Forum and the World Demographic and Ageing Forum to university faculties, pharmaceutical and finance companies as well as private foundations:

- World Health Organization (WHO), (Switzerland) Advisory Board on Age-Friendly Communities (since 2013).
- World Demographic and Ageing Forum (WDA), (Switzerland) (since 2005).
- Mayoral Advisory Council of the City of Rio de Janeiro, (Brazil) (since 2013).
- Board of Curators: Museum of the Future, Roberto Marinho Foundation, (Brazil) (since 2011).
- Calouste Gulbenkian Foundation, (Portugal) (since 2013).
- International Longevity Centres Global Alliance Board\ International Longevity Centre-Brazil Board, (UK\Brazil) (since 2012).
- Consultancy Committee on Longevity (Chair), Bradesco Seguros, (Brazil) (since 2008).
- Advisory Board of the Andalusian School of Public Health (EASP), (Spain) (since 2011).
- Jury Board (President), Bradesco Awards for Longevity (Brazil), (since 2012).

=== Previous board memberships ===
- Merck Global Adult Vaccines Advisory Board, (USA) (2008-2010).
- Steering Committee of the World Economic Forum (WEF) on Latin America, (2011).
- University of Alberta, Faculty of Agriculture, Life and Environmental Sciences, (Canada) (2009-2011).
- United Nations` Expert Committee on Human Rights (UNHCR), (2010-2011).
- Pontificia Universidad Catolica de Chile (PUC), Geriatric and Gerontologic Centre, (Chile).
- Jury Board (President) of the International Award of HRH. Crown Prince Felipe of Spain, (Spain) (2010).
- Technical Board (CTA) for São Paulo State Policies on the Health of the Elderly-SES\SP., (Brazil).
- Steering Board of the International Alliance of NGOs for a UN Convention on the Rights of Older Persons, (2010-2012).
- Advisory Board for the Secretary of Development for the State of São Paulo for the Implementation of the Age-Friendly State of São Paulo, (2009-2012).
- Scientific Board of the World Conference on Gerontechnology, (2010).
- International Programme Board for the International Federation of Ageing (IFA), 10th Geneva International Network on Aging (GINA), (Switzerland) (Founder member & President), (1995-2007).
- Nicaragua Health Fund (Founder member), (1984-1988).
- Oxfam Advisory Board, (Latin America desk\ Grant-giving Committee) (UK) (1979-1985).
- Christian Aid Advisory Board, (Grant-giving Committee) (UK) (1981-1984).
- HelpAge International (HAI), (Founder member) (UK) (1983-1996).
- Global Conference (2010).

=== Memberships/fellowships ===
- Membership of the Royal College of Physicians (UK), Faculty of Community Medicine (since 1984).
- Fellowship of the International Association of Geriatrics and Gerontology (IAGG) (since 1987).
- Fellowship of the International Epidemiological Association (IEA) (since 1989).
- Honorary Membership of the British Society of Geriatrics (SBG).
- Membership of the Spanish Society of Geriatrics and Gerontology (SEGG) (since 2005).
- Membership and Honorary President (2010) of the Brazilian Society of Gerontology and Geriatrics (SBGG).
- Fellowship of the Aspen Institute, (Colorado, USA) (2003, 2004, 2006).
- Fellowship of the World Economic Forum (WEF), (Davos, Switzerland), (1999, 2000, 2001).
- Membership of the United Nations Group of Experts on the Rights of Older Persons (2009).
- Honorary Membership of La Association Espanola para el Estudio Cientifico del Envejecimento Saludable (AECES)(Spain).
- Member of the Brazilian Association of Social Medicine.
- Member of the Brazilian Association of Medical Education.
- Member of the Brazilian Society of Tropical Medicine.
- Member of the Latin American Society of Mastology.
- Member of the Brazilian Association of Cancerology.

== Awards ==
Kalache has been listed in the 100 most-influential Brazilians and is the recipient of awards in many countries both for lifetime achievement and for contribution to medical science.

== Selected publications ==
=== Articles ===
- Policy Principles: World Economic Forum (WEF) Global Agenda Council on the Ageing Society, (Co-author); Global Policy, Vol.2, Issue 1, p. 97-105, Jan. 2011.
- FERNÁNDEZ-BALLESTEROS, ROCÍO; ROBINE, JEAN MARIE; Kalache, Alex; WALKER, ALAN. Active Aging: A Global Goal. Current Gerontology and Geriatrics Research, v. 2013, p. 1-4.
- Kalache, Alexandre; PLOUFFE, LOUISE . Making communities age friendly: state and municipal initiatives in Canada and other countries.. Gaceta Sanitaria (Barcelona. Ed. impresa), v. 25, p. 131, 2011.
- JAY OLSHANSKY, S.; BIGGS, SIMON; Andrew ACHENBAUM, W.; DAVISON, GERALD C.; FRIED, LINDA; GUTMAN, GLORIA; Kalache, Alexandre; KHAW, KAY-TEE; FERNANDEZ, ALVARO; RATTAN, SURESH I. S.; GUIMARÃES, Renato MAIA; MILNER, COLIN; BUTLER, ROBERT N. . The Global Agenda Council on the Ageing Society: Policy Principles. Global Policy, v. 2, p. 97-105, 2011.
- PLOUFFE, LOUISE; Kalache, Alexandre . Towards Global Age-Friendly Cities: Determining Urban Features that Promote Active Aging. Journal of Urban Health, v. 87, p. 733-739, 2010.]
- Kalache, Alexandre . Towards age-friendly societies: from research to policy, from policy to society. International Journal of Integrated Care, v. 9, p. 1, 2009.
- Kalache, Alexandre . O Século do Envelhecimento e Sociedade que Queremos Construir. Revista Direitos Humanos, v. 3, p. 30-35, 2009.
- Kalache, Alexandre . O mundo envelhece: é imperativo criar um pacto de solidariedade social. Ciência e Saúde Coletiva (Impresso), v. 13, p. 1107-1111, 2008.
- Kalache, Alexandre . Fórum. Envelhecimento populacional e as informações de saúde do PNAD: demandas e desafios contemporâneos. Posfácio. Cadernos de Saúde Pública (ENSP. Impresso), v. 23, p. 2503-2505, 2007.
- Barreto, Sanhi Maria; Kalache, Alexandre; GIATTI, LUANA . Does health status explain gender dissimilarity in healthcare use among older adults?. Cadernos de Saúde Pública (ENSP. Impresso), v. 22, p. 347-355, 2006.
- Barreto, Sanhi Maria; GIATTI, LUANA; Kalache, Alexandre . Gender inequalities in health among older Brazilian adults. Revista Panamericana de Salud Pública (Impresa) / Pan American Journal of Public Health (Impresa), v. 16, p. 110-117, 2004.
- Kalache, Alexandre . Missing Voices Views of Older Persons on Elder Abuse. International Journal of Welfare for the Aged, v. 7, p. 45-70, 2002.
- Kalache, Alexandre . Rural Aging: Reduction of Existing Inequities Keynote Address, June 10, 2000. The Journal of Rural Health, v. 17, p. 312-313, 2001.
- Kalache, A.; Keller, I. . The WHO perspective on active ageing. Promotion & Éducation, v. 6, p. 20-23, 1999.
- Kalache, Alexandre . The World Health Organization perspective on gender, ageing and health. Ageing International, v. 24, p. 39-48, 1998.
- Kalache, Alexandre . Health and the ageing male. World Health, v. 51, p. 16-17, 1998.
- Ramos, Luiz Roberto; Kalache, Alexandre . Crescimento da população idosa no Brasil: transformações e conseqüências na sociedade. Revista de Saúde Pública (Impresso), v. 21, p. 225-233, 1987.
- Ramos, Luiz Roberto; Veras, Renato P.; Kalache, Alexandre . Envelhecimento populacional: uma realidade brasileira. Revista de Saúde Pública (Impresso), v. 21, p. 211-224, 1987.
- Kalache, Alexandre; Veras, Renato P.; Ramos, Luiz Roberto . O envelhecimento da populaÃ Ã o mundial: um desafio novo. Revista de Saúde Pública (Impresso), v. 21, p. 200-210, 1987.
- Kalache, Alexandre . Envelhecimento populacional no Brasil: uma realidade nova. Cadernos de Saúde Pública (ENSP. Impresso), v. 3, p. 217-220, 1987.

=== Book chapters ===
- The Longevity Revolution: Creating a Society for All Ages, Published by the Office of the Premier and Cabinet, South Australian State Government, 2013.
- Global Population Ageing: Peril or Promise, Co-editor/Contributing author, WEF Global Agenda Council on Ageing Society. Published by the World Economic Forum (WEF), 2012.
- Growing Old in an Older Brazil: Implications of Population Ageing on Growth, Poverty, Public Finance, and Service Delivery, (Contributor), Published by the World Bank, 2011.
- Cambridge Handbook of Age and Ageing, Chapter: Global Ageing; the Demographic Revolution in all Cultures and Societies (with S.M. Barreto and I. Keller), Cambridge University Press, 2005.
- Kalache, Alex . Direitos das pessoas idosas. In: Venturi, Gustavo. (Org.). Direitos Humanos : Percepções da Opinião Pública. 1ed.Brasília: Secretaria de Direitos Humanos, 2010, v., p. 189-200.
- Kalache, Alexandre . The World Health Organization and Global Aging. In: Robinson, Mary et al.. (Org.). Global Health & Global Aging. 1ed. San Francisco: Josey-Bass, 2007, v. 1, p. 31-46.
- Oxford Textbook of Geriatric Medicine, Chapter: Population Ageing in Developing Countries; demographic aspects (with I. Keller), Oxford University Press, 2000.
- Increasing Longevity, (Contributing author), Edited by Raymond Tallis, Published by the Royal College of Physicians, London, UK. 1998.
- Textbook of Geriatric Medicine and Gerontology, Brocklehurst, (Fifth Edition) Future Prospects for Geriatric Medicine in Developing Countries, Edinburgh: Churchill Livingstone, pp. 1513–21, 1998.
- Epidemiology in Old Age, Co-editor (with S. Ebrahim) and Contributing author, (Age Concern Book of the Year), Published by the British Medical Journal BMJ., 1996.
