= Eye (journal) =

- Discipline: Ophthalmology
- Language: English
- Edited by: Harminder Dua

Publication details
- Former name: Transactions of the Ophthalmological Societies of the United Kingdom
- History: 1881-present
- Publisher: Nature Research (United Kingdom)
- Frequency: Monthly
- Open access: Hybrid
- License: CC BY
- Impact factor: 4.4 (2025)

Standard abbreviations
- ISO 4: Eye
- NLM: Eye (Lond)

Indexing
- CODEN: EYEEEC
- ISSN: 0950-222X (print); 1476-5454 (web)
- OCLC no.: 15260106

Links
- Journal homepage; Online access; Online archive

Eye is a monthly peer-reviewed medical journal covering ophthalmology. It was established in 1881 as the Transactions of the Ophthalmological Societies of the United Kingdom, obtaining its current name in 1987. It is published by Springer Nature and is the official journal of the Royal College of Ophthalmologists. The editor-in-chief is Harminder Singh Dua (University of Nottingham). According to the Journal Citation Reports, Eye has a 2025 impact factor of 4.4.
