= National Academy for Social Prescribing =

The National Academy for Social Prescribing is a registered UK charity promoting health and wellbeing. It was launched on 23 October 2019.

The academy’s work includes:

• Connecting the social prescribing system, through training and consultancy, resources and a Champions scheme for clinicians and health workers.

• Creating innovative partnerships, from local to international.

• Boosting investment for frontline organisations delivering social prescribing, including through the Power of Music Fund and the Green Social Prescribing Programme.

• Building the evidence base, working with nearly 300 academics and experts around the world and publishing 15 thematic evidence reviews.

• Raising the profile of social prescribing through national campaigns.

NHS England provided around £650,000 for the initial set-up costs and the Department of Health and Social Care provided a £5m grant to the academy in 2020 and a further £3.6 million in 2022.

== Activities ==
In November 2020, the Academy, in collaboration with Arts Council England, announced the launch of a new £1.4 million Thriving Communities Fund, designed to develop local social prescribing activities across the country. The Academy contributed £1.15 million to the fund, with £250,000 provided by the Arts Council, which administered the fund.

The Academy has also established the Power of Music Fund, in partnership with The Utley Foundation, Arts Council England, Music for All and others. The fund supports local music and dementia projects, and also led to the establishment of the UK’s first Centre of Excellence for Music and Dementia in 2024.

It has also published more than 15 evidence reviews related to social prescribing and a wide range of toolkits and guidance for professionals. It has published a report on social prescribing around the world, and works with more than 30 countries around the world through its international programme.

== Governance ==
Charlotte Osborn-Forde is the Chief Executive of the National Academy for Social Prescribing.

Professor Kamila Hawthorne is the Chair of Trustees for the National Academy for Social Prescribing. She took over from Dame Helen Stokes-Lampard, who was the first Chair. The current trustees include:

Brad Gudger (Vice Chair)

Jonathan Badyal

Bashir Bahaj

Dr. Davina Deniszczyc

Amanda Ellingworth

Clova Fyfe

Sarah Metcalfe

Gay Palmer

Phoebe Vela-Hitchcox

Lisa Tookey
