= Robert Lechler =

British nephrologist, immunologist and academic

Sir Robert Lechler FRCP FRCPath FMedSci
- Born: 24 December 1951 (age 74)
- Known for: Research into transplant rejection; Kidney and liver transplant research
- Awards: Knight Bachelor (2012); FMedSci (2016)
- Scientific career
- Fields: Medicine; Organ transplantation
- Workplaces: King's College London; King's Health Partners; Academy of Medical Sciences
- Website: https://acmedsci.ac.uk/about/governance/academy-president/professor-sir-robert-lechler

Sir Robert Ian Lechler (born 24 December 1951) is a British nephrologist, immunologist, and academic. He specialises in transplantation tolerance and immunology. Since 2004, he has been Professor of Immunology at King's College London. Since 2009, he has been executive director of King's Health Partners.

He was educated at Monkton Combe School in Somerset, Victoria University of Manchester (MB ChB 1975), and the Royal Postgraduate Medical School (PhD 1983).

On 29 June 2015, Lechler was appointed as President of the Academy of Medical Sciences. and began his five-year term on 3 December 2015.

Lechler currently serves as the Chair of the Board of Trustees of Croydon based orchestra London Mozart Players.

== Honours ==
Lechler was elected a Fellow of the Royal College of Physicians (FRCP) in 1990, a Fellow of the Royal College of Pathologists (FRCPath) in 1996, and a Fellow of the Academy of Medical Sciences (FMedSci) in 2000.

In the 2012 Queen's Birthday Honours, Lechler was made a Knight Bachelor "for services to Academic Medicine", and therefore granted the title sir. On 7 November 2012, he was knighted by Anne, Princess Royal (acting on behalf of Queen Elizabeth II) during a ceremony at Buckingham Palace.

Educational offices
| Preceded by Sir John Tooke | President of the Academy of Medical Sciences; 2015 to present | Incumbent |
