= Ron Kerr =

Health service manager in the United Kingdom

Sir Ronald James Kerr is a health service manager in the United Kingdom.

He was chief executive of Guy's and St Thomas' NHS Foundation Trust from 2007 until 2015, continuing as executive vice-chairman until 2017. In 2011 he was the fourth highest earner in the NHS, with a salary of £274,500.

He was formerly chief executive of United Bristol Healthcare NHS Trust, and before that chief executive of the National Care Standards Commission. In 2015 he was chair of the Shelford Group, a collaboration between large research and teaching hospitals in NHS England.

He was knighted in the 2011 New Year’s Honours. In 2015 the Health Service Journal placed him eighth among the top chief executives in the National Health Service.

In 2018 he wrote the Sir Ron Kerr review: empowering NHS leaders to lead into bullying in the NHS, which concluded that bullying and discrimination are "prevalent and accepted" amongst those with leadership responsibility in the NHS: "The conditions in which leaders operate are stressful and difficult, with great responsibility and the highest stakes. "Over time, this has led to a negative working culture in which both bullying and discrimination are prevalent and accepted."This must change and should be led from the top, with NHS leaders ensuring they model the highest standards of behaviour."

Kerr has been chair of NHS Providers, an organisation representing NHS trusts in England, since January 2020.
