= Susan Bailey =

British psychiatrist and academic

Dame Sue Bailey DBE FRCPsych

Chair of the Academy of Medical Royal Colleges
- Incumbent
- Assumed office 1 January 2015
- Preceded by: Terence Stephenson

President of the Royal College of Psychiatrists
- In office 30 June 2011 – 2014
- Preceded by: Dinesh Bhugra
- Succeeded by: Sir Simon Wessely

Personal details
- Born: Susan Mary Bailey; 29 August 1950 (age 75) Manchester, England
- Education: Hulme Grammar School for Girls; Watford Grammar School for Girls
- Alma mater: University of Manchester
- Profession: Psychiatrist
- Awards: FRCPsych (1996); OBE (2002); DBE (2014)

Dame Susan Mary Bailey (born 29 August 1950) is a British psychiatrist and academic who specialises in children's mental health. Since 2004, she has been Professor of Child Mental Health at the University of Central Lancashire. From 2011 to 2014, she was President of the Royal College of Psychiatrists. Since January 2015, she has been Chair of the Academy of Medical Royal Colleges.

== Early life ==
Bailey was born on 29 August 1950 in Manchester, England. She was educated at Hulme Grammar School for Girls, then a direct grant grammar school in Oldham, and at Watford Grammar School for Girls, then a grammar school in Watford. She studied medicine at the University of Manchester and graduated with Bachelor of Medicine, Bachelor of Surgery (MB ChB) degrees in 1973.

== Medical career ==
Bailey became a Member of the Royal College of Psychiatrists (MRCPsych) in 1976 and was elected a Fellow of the Royal College of Psychiatrists (FRCPsych) in 1996. Since 1983, she has been a consultant child and adolescent forensic psychiatrist at the Greater Manchester West Mental Health NHS Foundation Trust. In 1993, she appeared as an expert witness in the James Bulger murder trial. She concluded that one of Bulger's killers, Jon Venables, knew the difference between right and wrong: information that led to them being convicted of murder. She thereafter remained Venables' psychiatrist through his adolescence.

Between 2001 and 2014, Bailey held a number of senior positions in the Royal College of Psychiatrists. She was Chair of the Child and Adolescent Faculty from 2001 to 2005, and was registrar from 2005 to 2010. From 30 June 2011 to 2014, she was President of the college. Since 1 January 2015, she has been Chair of the Academy of Medical Royal Colleges.

In 2002, Bailey was an Honorary Fellow at the University of Surrey. Since 2004, she has been Professor of Child Mental Health at the University of Central Lancashire and a Senior Research Fellow at the University of Manchester.

== Honours ==
In the 2002 Queen's Birthday Honours, Bailey was appointed an Officer of the Order of the British Empire (OBE) "for services to Youth Justice". In the 2014 New Year Honours, she was promoted to Dame Commander of the Order of the British Empire (DBE) "for services to Psychiatry and for voluntary service to People with Mental Health Conditions".

== Selected works ==
- Bailey, Susan (1996). "Psychiatric assessment of the violent children and adolescent towards understanding and safe intervention". In Varma, Ved (ed.). Violence in children and adolescents. London: Jessica Kingsley Publishers. ISBN 978-1853023446.
- Bailey, Susan; Dolan, Mairead, eds. (2004). Adolescent forensic psychiatry. London: Arnold. ISBN 978-0340763896.

Professional and academic associations
Preceded by Dinesh Bhugra	President of the Royal College of Psychiatrists; 2011 to 2014	Succeeded by Sir Simon Wessely
Preceded by Terence Stephenson	Chair of the Academy of Medical Royal Colleges; 2015 to present	Incumbent
