= Clare Marx =

British surgeon (1954–2022)

Dame Clare Marx DBE DL FRCS
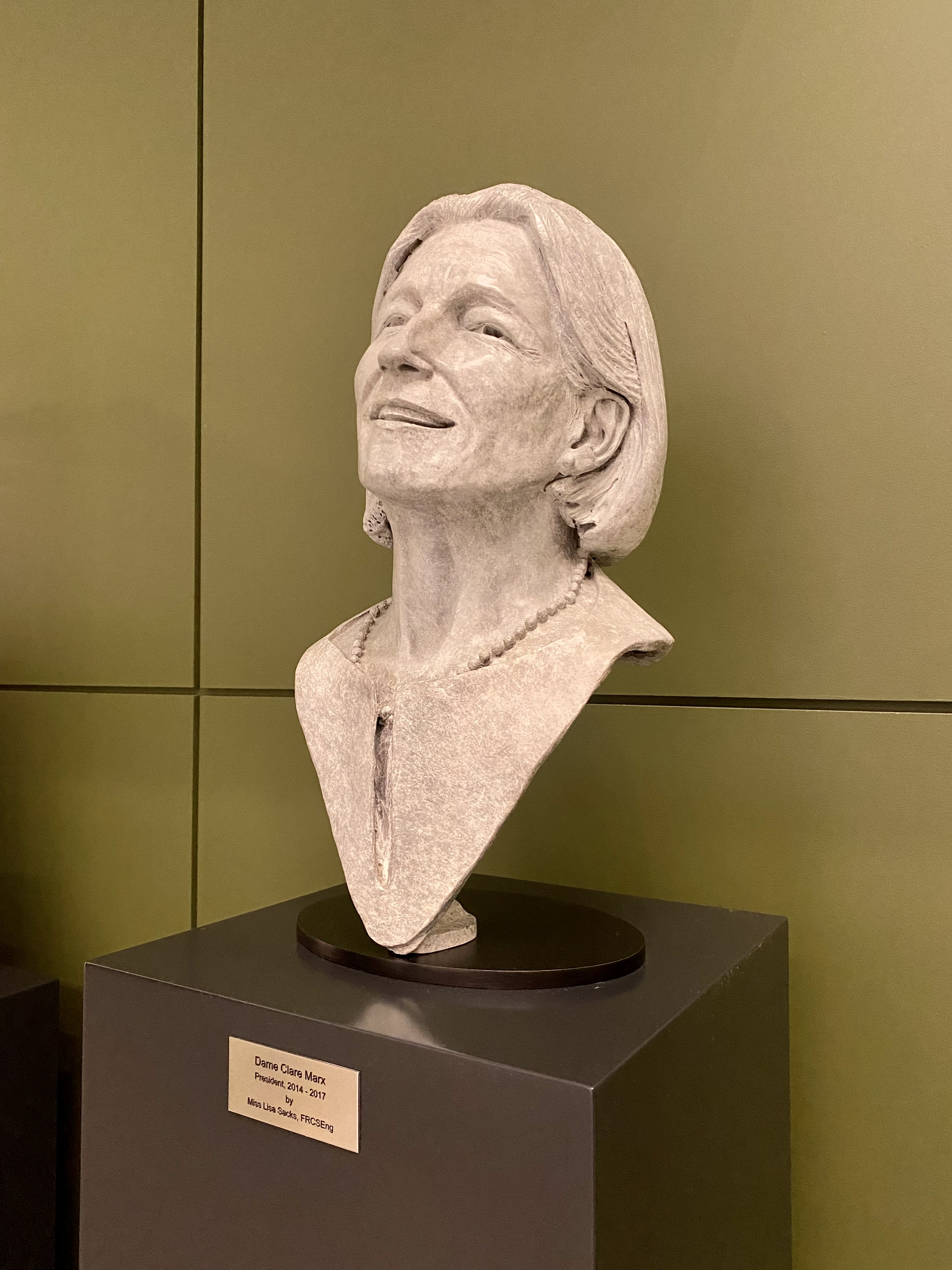
- Bust of Marx at the Royal College of Surgeons of England
- Born: Clare Lucy Marx; 15 March 1954; Coventry, England
- Died: 27 November 2022 (aged 68); Woodbridge, Suffolk, England
- Education: University College London Medical School
- Spouse: Andrew Fane (m. 1989)
- Scientific career
- Workplaces: Associate Medical Director, Ipswich Hospital NHS Trust; President, Royal College of Surgeons of England; Chair, Faculty of Medical Leadership and Management; Chair, General Medical Council

Dame Clare Lucy Marx DBE DL FRCS (15 March 1954 – 27 November 2022) was a British surgeon who was president of the Royal College of Surgeons of England from July 2014 to July 2017, the first woman to hold the position, and former chair of the Faculty of Medical Leadership and Management. From January 2019 until July 2021, Marx was chair of the General Medical Council, the first woman appointed to that role.

Marx worked as an orthopaedic surgeon at Ipswich Hospital NHS Trust from 1993.

== Background ==
Clare Lucy Marx was born in Coventry, England on 15 March 1954, the daughter of Francis Ulrich Marx, a German industrial chemist, and Brenda (Johnston) Marx, a teacher and magistrate. She grew up in Warwick and, later, Cheltenham. She decided to become a doctor after a work experience placement at Coventry Hospital.

She married Andrew William Mildmay Fane, son of Major Robert William Augustus Fane and Elinor Valerie (Borthwick) Fane, in 1989.

Marx was diagnosed with pancreatic cancer in 2021. She died from the disease at home in Woodbridge, Suffolk, on 27 November 2022, aged 68.

== Career ==
Marx qualified in medicine from the University College London Medical School in 1977. Her surgical house jobs were in the London area and later she completed arthroplasty training at Brigham and Women's Hospital in Boston, Massachusetts, in the United States. She became a consultant orthopaedic surgeon at St Mary's and St Charles's hospitals with a particular interest in early surgical education. In 1993, she became clinical director of the combined A&E, Trauma & Orthopaedics and Rheumatology directorate at Ipswich Hospital.

Later, she chaired the LNC and the Medical Staff Committee. She was also extensively involved in governance and in new projects at the hospital.

In 2009, Marx was elected to the RCS Council. She was also elected to the British Orthopaedic Association (BOA) Council and became president of the BOA for 2008–2009. She was appointed chair of the RCS-invited review Mechanism in 2011.

In 2013, she became associate medical director at Ipswich Hospital NHS Trust with a special remit for revalidation and appraisal, and continued in that role, having stopped active orthopaedic practice in March 2014. She became president of the college in July 2014 and held this role for three years. Marx was chair of the Faculty of Medical Leadership and Management from 2017 to 2018. In 2019, she became chair of the GMC.

After the United Kingdom voted to leave the European Union in the June 2016 referendum, Marx posited in an interview with The Daily Telegraph that Brexit was an opportunity to improve safety standards in the NHS by strengthening medical device legislation and language testing for non-British workers. She felt the European Working Time Directive, which restricts working hours in the NHS, needed to be relaxed to permit more hours of training. The Royal College of Surgeons of England later sent out a press release clarifying that they did not endorse a return to excessive hours for NHS workers.

Marx resigned as chair of the GMC at the end of July 2021, following a diagnosis of pancreatic cancer. She was the first woman to hold the position since the founding of the organisation in 1858.

== Honours ==
- 2007 Appointed Commander of the Order of the British Empire (CBE) for services to medicine (2007 Birthday Honours)
- 2008 Deputy Lieutenant of Suffolk
- 2016 Honorary degree from the University of Exeter for services to medicine
- 2017 Honorary Fellowship of the Royal College of Surgeons in Ireland (FRCSI)
- 2018 Appointed Dame Commander of the Order of the British Empire (DBE) for services to surgery in the NHS (2018 New Year Honours)

Academic offices
Preceded by Sir Norman Williams	President of the Royal College of Surgeons of England; 2014–2017	Succeeded by Derek Alderson
