= Fitness to practise =

Aspect of medical law and medical licensing

In medical law and medical licensing, fitness to practise is a concept in the regulation of medicine regarding whether a health professional or social worker should be allowed to work. While fitness to practice can include matters of technical competence, including qualifications the concept also contains questions about the implications of the health of the professional and their ethics.

Concerns regarding a professional's fitness to practice are often addressed by professional bodies, though sometimes the decision-making process of these bodies is legislated. The decisions can involve quasi-judicial proceedings, that are constrained in some countries by judicial review on the grounds of procedural fairness.

Some countries maintain a register of people who are allowed to work in a particular healthcare field, and through legislation these titles are "protected" so that individuals not on this register (or removed from this register) cannot use a this title.

A professional deemed to not be fit to practice may no longer be able to practice.

== Goals of regulating fitness to practice ==
Professional bodies say that they regulate fitness to practice to ensure public trust, protect the public interest, to ensure life-long competence and to improve healthcare outcomes. Authors who write on the topics are often interested in the quality of care, patient safety, and risk of medical errors, and more generally the social contract between the medical professions and society.

== Regulation by country ==
=== United Kingdom ===
In the United Kingdom, the Health and Care Professions Council, Nursing and Midwifery Council and the General Medical Council have a legislatively mandated role in controlling the behavior of health care professionals. Social work is regulated by the General Social Care Council.

The General Medical Council's role in regulating fitness to practice is regulated by the 1983 Medical Act.

There are around 1200 hearings each year regarding fitness to practice. The General Medical Council carries out hearings through the Medical Practitioners Tribunal Service.

A GMC fitness to practice hearing begins with a complaint, the GMC will then investigate the case and decide whether to refer the case a to the MPTS, a case may be dismissed by the GMC. The GMC investigation involves giving the doctor an opportunity to respond, before obtaining expert evidence and written witness statements for involved parties, as well as carrying out assessments of a doctors competence or health. The GMC may then choose to suspend the doctor pending a decision at a MPTS trial. MPTS cases are held in public unless they involve matters of a doctors health. An appeal to the High Court of Justice can be made if a doctor disagrees with the outcome. If a doctor is convicted of a criminal offence the GMC will treat the conviction as proof of the offence.

=== United States ===
In the United States fitness to practise is regulated by medical boards. These boards generally have medical and non-medical members. Many states have separate boards for professionals with qualifications from Doctor of Osteopathic Medicine(DO) and Doctor of Medicine (MD) qualifications.

Before the 1970s most regulation was self-regulation but this changed due public pressure.
