= Jonathan Montgomery =

British legal scholar

Sir Jonathan Montgomery
- Born: Jonathan Montgomery
- Board member of: Non-Executive Director, Health Data Research UK. Chair, Oxford University Hospitals NHS Foundation Trust

Academic background
- Education: King's College School, Wimbledon
- Alma mater: University of Cambridge

Academic work
- Discipline: Law
- Sub-discipline: Health care law
- Institutions: University College London
- Notable works: Health Care Law (Oxford University Press 2nd ed 2002).
- Website: www.laws.ucl.ac.uk/people/jonathan-montgomery

Sir Jonathan Robert Montgomery is a British legal scholar who specialises in health care law. He is Professor of Health Care Law at UCL Faculty of Laws.

Professor Montgomery has chaired many national and international bodies. He was chair of the Human Genetics Commission from 2009 until 2012. He was chair of the Nuffield Council on Bioethics, the leading UK bioethics committee, from 2012 to 2017. He was also Chair of the Health Research Authority from 2012 until September 2019.

In March 2017, he became a member of the European Group on Ethics (EGE), which is the leading European bioethics. committee He is a regular contributor to items in the media, including the BBC and broadsheet newspapers, and has given evidence to the UK Parliament.

Since 1 April 2019, he has been Chair of the Oxford University Hospitals NHS Foundation Trust.

He was appointed a Knight Bachelor in the 2019 New Year Honours for services to Bioethics and to Healthcare Law. In 2021, he was elected a Fellow of the Academy of Medical Sciences.

== Books ==
- Health Care Law (2nd edition, Oxford University Press, 2002)
