= John Bligh (medical educator) =

British doctor and medical educator

John Bligh FRCGP is an Emeritus Professor of Medical Education and a former dean at Cardiff University School of Medicine from 2014 to 2016. He was the first elected President of the Academy of Medical Educators (AoME).

== Education and early career ==
Bligh studied at the University of St Andrews and the University of Manchester, graduating in medicine.

He worked as a general practitioner at the Lache Health Centre in Chester for 11 years. He became a fellow of the Royal College of General Practitioners.

== Medical education ==
He was head of the department of health care education at the University of Liverpool. In 1995, he was appointed Professor of Primary Care Education, then Professor of Medical Education.

He was editor of the journal Medical Education from 1997 to 2005.

He joined the foundation staff of the Peninsula Medical School in 2001.

In 2010, he took up a position at Cardiff University as Professor of Clinical Education and Director of the Institute of Clinical Education. In January 2014, he became the Dean of Medicine at Cardiff University. He retired at the end of 2016.

== Awards and honours ==
In May 2008, he was awarded an honorary fellowship from the Academy of Medical Educators.

The Royal College of General Practitioners awarded him a silver medal and the RCGP William Pickles Lectureship in 2012.

Peninsula College of Medicine and Dentistry awarded him an honorary MD in July 2018.
