= Academy of Medical Educators, United Kingdom =

Academy of Medical Educators
- Established: 1 October 2006
- Headquarters: Cardiff University School of Medicine, Neuadd Meirionnydd, Heath Park, Cardiff CF14 4YS
- Location: Cardiff, Wales, United Kingdom
- President: Nick Cooper
- Website: www.medicaleducators.org

The Academy of Medical Educators (AoME) is a multi-professional body which is the standard setting body for clinical teachers in the United Kingdom. It was formed in 2006 and has developed recognised frameworks for educators.

== Activities ==
The academy has stated aims which relate to the advancement of medical education for the public benefit. This includes developing a transparent career structure for specialist medical educators. The academy funds some research, including gathering evidence in support of their policies.

== History ==
The academy was established in October 2006. It became the first professional organisation for medical educators which was designed to offer career support to members through a registerable qualification and professional accreditation. By January 2008, the academy had internal governance structures in place. The academy's stated mission is "Improving patient care through teaching excellence."

The academy published the first professional standards for medical educators in 2009. The standards were revised in 2012 and then again in 2015.

The General Medical Council (GMC) have adopted the AoME's "Framework for Supervisors" (2010), as the framework for the criteria which all trainers in recognised roles will be expected to provide evidence of their ongoing professional development against.

== Membership ==
Members are entitled to use the post nominals MAcadMEd and fellows may use FAcadMEd.

Full membership can also be gained where individuals have gained certain educational qualifications from an institution that is accredited by AoME.

Some medical colleges have an arrangement where they are corporate partners with the academy.

== List of presidents ==
- 2007–2011: John Bligh
- 2011–2014: Sean Hilton
- 2014–2017: Derek Gallen
- 2017–2023: Jacky Hayden
- 2023–present: Nick Cooper

== Governance ==
On 12 October 2006, the academy became a Company Limited by Guarantee with Companies' House (Company number 5965178). It registered as a charity with the Charity Commission for England and Wales on 2 April 2009.

The academy is governed by a Council of Trustees, who are also the Directors of the company. There are 18 members of Council (16 of whom are elected by the members of the academy) including Honorary Officers whose have roles in providing strategic advice.
