= Maureen Baker (doctor) =

Scottish doctor, Chair of the Royal College of General Practitioners

Maureen Baker CBE FRCGP
- Born: 20 September 1958 (age 67); Motherwell, Scotland
- Education: University of Dundee; University of Nottingham
- Occupation: General practitioner
- Known for: former Chair of Council of the Royal College of General Practitioners

Maureen Baker CBE FRCGP (born 20 September 1958) is a Scottish medical doctor who was Chair of the Royal College of General Practitioners (RCGP) from 2013 to 2016. She was previously Honorary Secretary of the RCGP from 1999 to 2009.

== Early life and education ==
Baker was born in Motherwell on 20 September 1958. Her parents were Helen and William Murphy. She was educated at the Holy Cross High School in Hamilton. After school, she studied medicine at the University of Dundee, graduating with MB, ChB in 1981. She then attended the University of Nottingham, obtaining a DM.

== Career ==
From 1985 to 2000, she worked as a general practitioner in Lincoln. Early in her career, she was involved with teaching.

She joined Connecting for Health in 2007 and was Clinical Director for Patient Safety at the Health and Social Care Information Centre (HSCIC 2007–2016).

=== Royal College positions ===
She was elected as Honorary Secretary of the Royal College of General Practitioners (RCGP) in 1999. In May 2013 she was elected as chair of the RCGP Council, taking up the position in November 2013. During her term as chair of RCGP council, she often articulated problems affecting general practice, acknowledging that some of these problems have been attributed to the "pull of London and the South-east". She has commented on the need to be able to improve the distribution of the medical workforce, suggesting that reasonable incentives might help attract doctors to some areas. Her term as Council Chair ended in November 2016, when she was succeeded as Chair by Helen Stokes-Lampard.

In December 2013, the Health Service Journal listed her as the 26th most powerful person in the National Health Service. In 2014, she was listed in the journal's top 100 clinical leaders, and in 2015, she was as the 39th most influential person in NHS (England).

=== Professional Record Standards Body ===
Baker took up the position of Chair of the Professional Record Standards Body in November 2017. After seven years in the role, she stepped down in 2024.

== Awards and honours ==
She was made a Commander of the Most Excellent Order of the British Empire (CBE) in the 2004 New Year Honours for services to medicine.

In 2009, she received the RCGP Foundation Council Award for meritorious services to general practice.

== Personal life ==
In 1984, she married Peter Baker. They have two daughters, Carolyn and Elena.
