= Academy of Medical Royal Colleges =

British and Irish medical school body

- Established: 1974; 52 years ago
- Headquarters: Clerkenwell, London, England
- Region served: United Kingdom
- Website: www.aomrc.org.uk

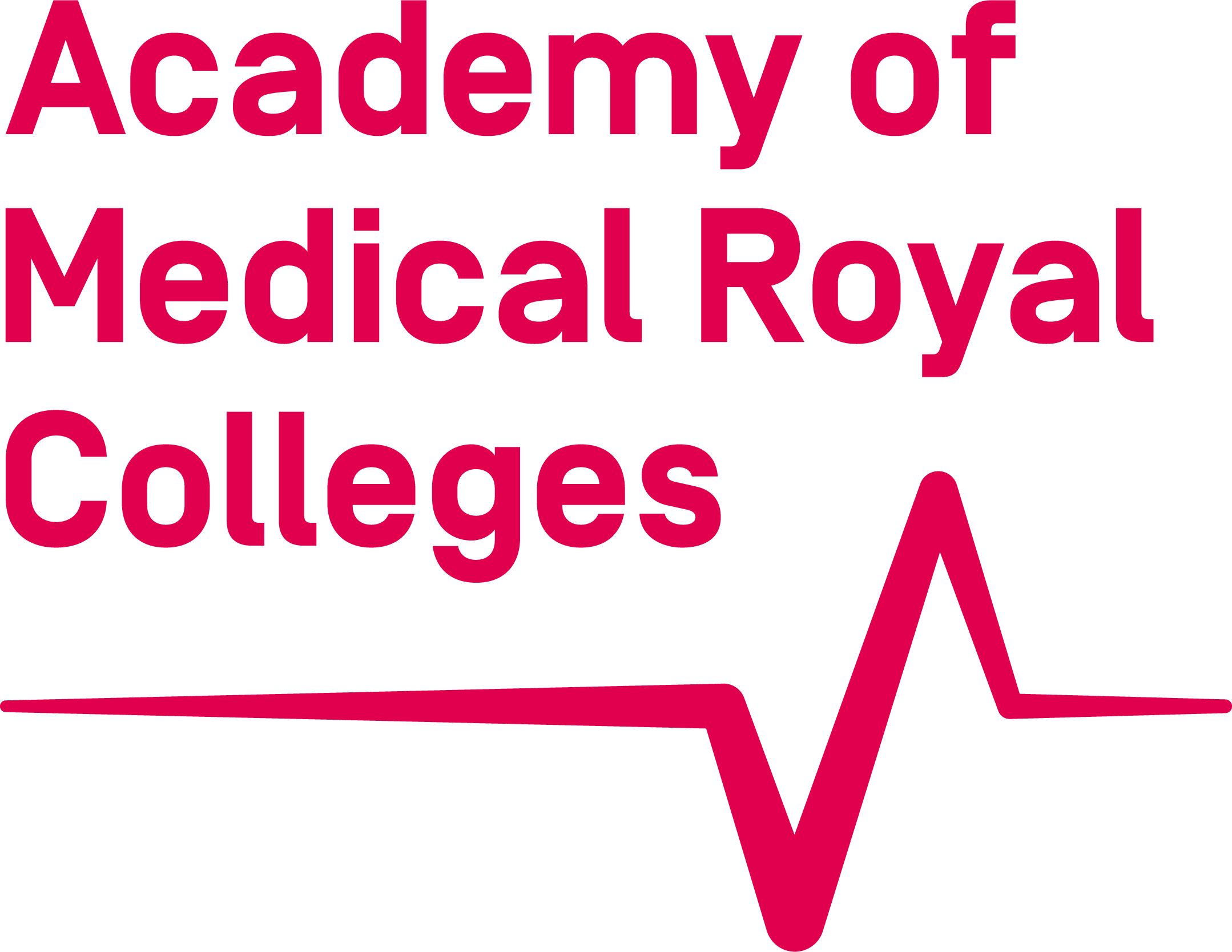

The Academy of Medical Royal Colleges (AoMRC) is the coordinating body for the United Kingdom and Ireland's 23 Medical Royal Colleges and Faculties. It ensures that patients are safely and properly cared for by setting standards for the way doctors are educated, trained and monitored throughout their careers. The Academy Council meet regularly to agree direction. The Council comprises the Presidents of the member Colleges and Faculties (plus the Chair of the Royal College of General Practitioners Council) and four coopted council members.

The Academy’s aim is to collate its members' views, and coordinate activities to collectively influence and shape healthcare across the four nations of the UK. The Academy also plays a leading role particularly in the areas of clinical quality, public health and the education and training of doctors. The Academy also works closely with organisations such as the NHS, the General Medical Council and patient groups on projects designed to improve the quality of care, such as the Evidence-based Interventions Programme and the Medical Training Initiative.

Established in 1974 as the Conference of Medical Royal Colleges and their Faculties, it was renamed the Academy of Medical Royal Colleges in 1996.

It has established one Faculty of its own – The Faculty of Medical Leadership and Management (FMLM), which is jointly administered by the Royal Colleges of Physicians and of General Practitioners.

== List of chairs of the Academy of Medical Royal Colleges ==
The Chair is the elected head of the Academy of Medical Royal Colleges. Their term of officer is up to three years.

- Dame Fiona Caldicott 1996
- Professor Narendra Babubhai Patel 1997
- Professor Roderick Norman McIver MacSween
- Professor Sir Alan Craft (2004 to 2007)
- Professor Dame Carol Black (2007 to 2009)
- Professor Sir Neil Douglas (2009 to 2012)
- Professor Terence Stephenson (2012 to 2015)
- Professor Dame Susan Bailey (2015 to 2017)
- Professor Carrie MacEwen (2017 to 2020)
- Professor Dame Helen Stokes-Lampard (2020 to 2023)
- Dr Jeanette Dickson (2023 to present)

== Committees & other subgroups ==
- Academy Education Strategy Committee
- Academy Foundation Programme Committee
- Academy Assessment Committee
- Academy Trainee Doctors' Committee
- Academy Patient/Lay Group
- Academy Specialty and Associate Specialist (SAS) Committee
- Academy Professional Development Committee
- Academy Workforce Committee
- Joint Academy Training Forum

== Members ==
- Faculty of Dental Surgery
- Faculty of Dental Surgery (Edinburgh)
- Faculty of Intensive Care Medicine
- Faculty of Occupational Medicine
- Faculty of Pharmaceutical Medicine
- Faculty of Public Health
- Faculty of Sport and Exercise Medicine
- College of Sexual and Reproductive Healthcare
- Royal College of Anaesthetists
- Royal College of Emergency Medicine
- Royal College of General Practitioners
- Royal College of Obstetricians and Gynaecologists
- Royal College of Ophthalmologists
- Royal College of Paediatrics and Child Health
- Royal College of Pathologists
- Royal College of Physicians
- Royal College of Physicians of Edinburgh
- Royal College of Physicians of Ireland
- Royal College of Physicians and Surgeons of Glasgow
- Royal College of Psychiatrists
- Royal College of Radiologists
- Royal College of Surgeons in Ireland
- Royal College of Surgeons of Edinburgh
- Royal College of Surgeons of England

There is a separate Scottish organisation: The Academy of Medical Royal Colleges and Faculties in Scotland.

== See also ==
- Medical royal colleges
