= Maureen Baker (sociologist) =

New Zealand sociologist

- Born: 1948 (age 77–78); Toronto, Canada
- Known for: researching the gender gap and sociology of families
- Awards: FRSNZ; FNZAH

Academic background
- Education: University of Alberta
- Thesis: Women as a minority group in the academic profession (1975)

Academic work
- Discipline: Sociology
- Institutions: McGill University; University of Auckland

Maureen Baker FRSNZ (born 1948) is a Canadian–New Zealand sociologist and an emeritus professor of the University of Auckland. She has been a Fellow of the Royal Society Te Apārangi since 2009. Baker's work focused on children, families and gender.

== Academic career ==
Baker was born in 1948 in Toronto. She obtained a BA from the University of Toronto in 1970, and went on to complete an M.A. in 1972. Her PhD from the University of Alberta, in 1975, was titled Women as a Minority Group in the Academic Profession. For seven years, Baker was a policy adviser to the Canadian government. She also worked as an associate professor and professor at McGill University before moving to New Zealand in 1998.

Much of Baker's work compares family situations in the three former British colonies of Australia, Canada and New Zealand, in all of which she has worked. Baker has written eleven books and authored three others. Her book Families: Changing Trends in Canada has had six editions. Baker retired in 2014, after sixteen years at Auckland University, and is an emeritus professor.

== Awards and honours ==
Baker was elected as a Fellow of the New Zealand Academy of the Humanities in 2008, and as a Fellow of the Royal Society Te Apārangi in 2009.

== Selected works ==
- Claire Cartwright; Baker, Maureen, Stepparenting, doi:10.4135/9781452274447.n416, Wikidata Q58034180
- Baker, Maureen (1995). "Eliminating Child Poverty: How Does Canada Compare?". American Review of Canadian Studies. 25 (1): 79–110. doi:10.1080/02722019509481787. Wikidata Q58124441.
- Baker, Maureen (1998). "Women, Family Policies and the Moral Right". Canadian Review of Social Policy (40). ISSN 0836-303X. Wikidata Q108465510.
- Baker, Maureen (1995). "Family Poverty and Work/Family Conflicts: Inconsistent Social Policies". Canadian Review of Social Policy (33). ISSN 0836-303X. Wikidata Q108465575.
- Baker, Maureen; Vivienne Elizabeth (2012). "A 'brave thing to do' or a normative practice? Marriage after long-term cohabitation". Journal of Sociology. 50 (4): 393–407. doi:10.1177/1440783312462165. Wikidata Q108872194.
- Baker, Maureen (2010). "Motherhood, employment and the "child penalty"". Women's Studies International Forum. 33 (3): 215–224. doi:10.1016/j.wsif.2010.01.004. Wikidata Q108872195.
- Baker, Maureen (2010). "Career confidence and gendered expectations of academic promotion". Journal of Sociology. 46 (3): 317–334. doi:10.1177/1440783310371402. Wikidata Q108872196.
