= Legislatures of the United Kingdom =

Parliamentary bodies of the United Kingdom and its component jurisdictions

The legislatures of the United Kingdom are derived from a number of different sources. The Parliament of the United Kingdom is the supreme legislative body for the United Kingdom and the British overseas territories with Scotland, Wales and Northern Ireland each having their own devolved legislatures. Each of the three major jurisdictions of the United Kingdom (England and Wales, Scotland and Northern Ireland) has its own Laws and legal system.

== United Kingdom legislature ==
The Parliament of the United Kingdom can enact primary legislation for the whole of the United Kingdom. In addition, the General Synod of the Church of England and the Privy Council can do so in certain limited cases.

=== Parliament of the United Kingdom of Great Britain and Northern Ireland ===
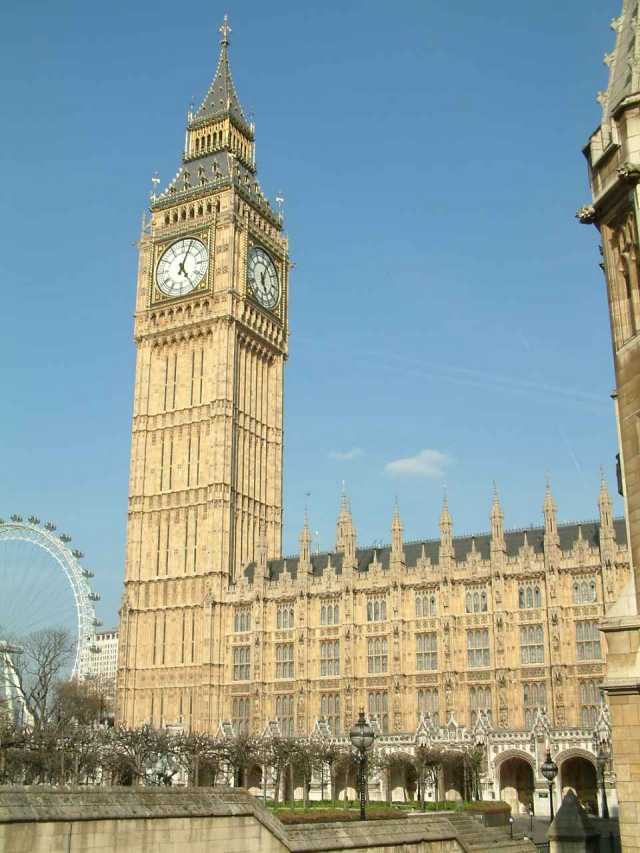
The UK Parliament meets at the Palace of Westminster in London.

The Parliament of the United Kingdom of Great Britain and Northern Ireland, commonly known as the UK Parliament, the British Parliament, the Westminster Parliament or "Westminster", is the supreme legislative body for the United Kingdom and for English Law. It alone possesses legislative supremacy and thereby ultimate power over all other political bodies in the UK and its territories. Its head is the Sovereign of the United Kingdom, currently King Charles III. Its seat is the Palace of Westminster in Westminster, London.

The United Kingdom Legislation may take the form of Acts, passed directly by Parliament, or Statutory instruments, made under the authority of an Act of Parliament by either a government minister or by the King-in-Council. The latter are generally subject either to parliamentary approval (affirmative procedure) or parliamentary disallowance (negative procedure). The majority of Acts considered in the UK are defined as public general acts, or 'Acts of Parliament' as they will have progressed and gained approval as a Bill through both House of Commons and House of Lords, and have gained Royal Assent from the Monarch.

Local and Personal Acts of Parliament are presented to Parliament as a result of sponsored petitions. These are processed through committees to enable relevant or affected parties to challenge or change the proposed Act. Prerogative instruments, made by the Sovereign under the royal prerogative are another source of UK-wide legislation. The UK Parliament is responsible for all matters relating to defence and all foreign affairs and relations with international organisations, particularly the United Nations, the Commonwealth and the European Union.

With there being no devolved legislature in England the UK Parliament is the supreme body for its governance, legislation, public bodies and local government.

==== House of Commons ====
The House of Commons is the lower house of the Parliament of the United Kingdom. It is an elected chamber consisting of 650 members, known as Members of Parliament (MPs). They are elected using the first past the post system, in single-member constituencies. From the 2024 general election 543 will be elected from England, 57 from Scotland, 32 from Wales and 18 from Northern Ireland.

The House of Commons is now considered to be the supreme chamber of Parliament.

==== House of Lords ====
The House of Lords is the upper house of the Parliament of the United Kingdom. It is an unelected chamber with all members to the House of Lords being appointed. As of August 2018, there are 793 members known as "Peers". The House of Lords no longer has the same powers as the House of Commons under the Parliament Acts 1911 and 1949, especially when it comes to blocking general legislation and the passing of financial legislation.

== Devolved legislatures ==
=== Scottish Parliament ===
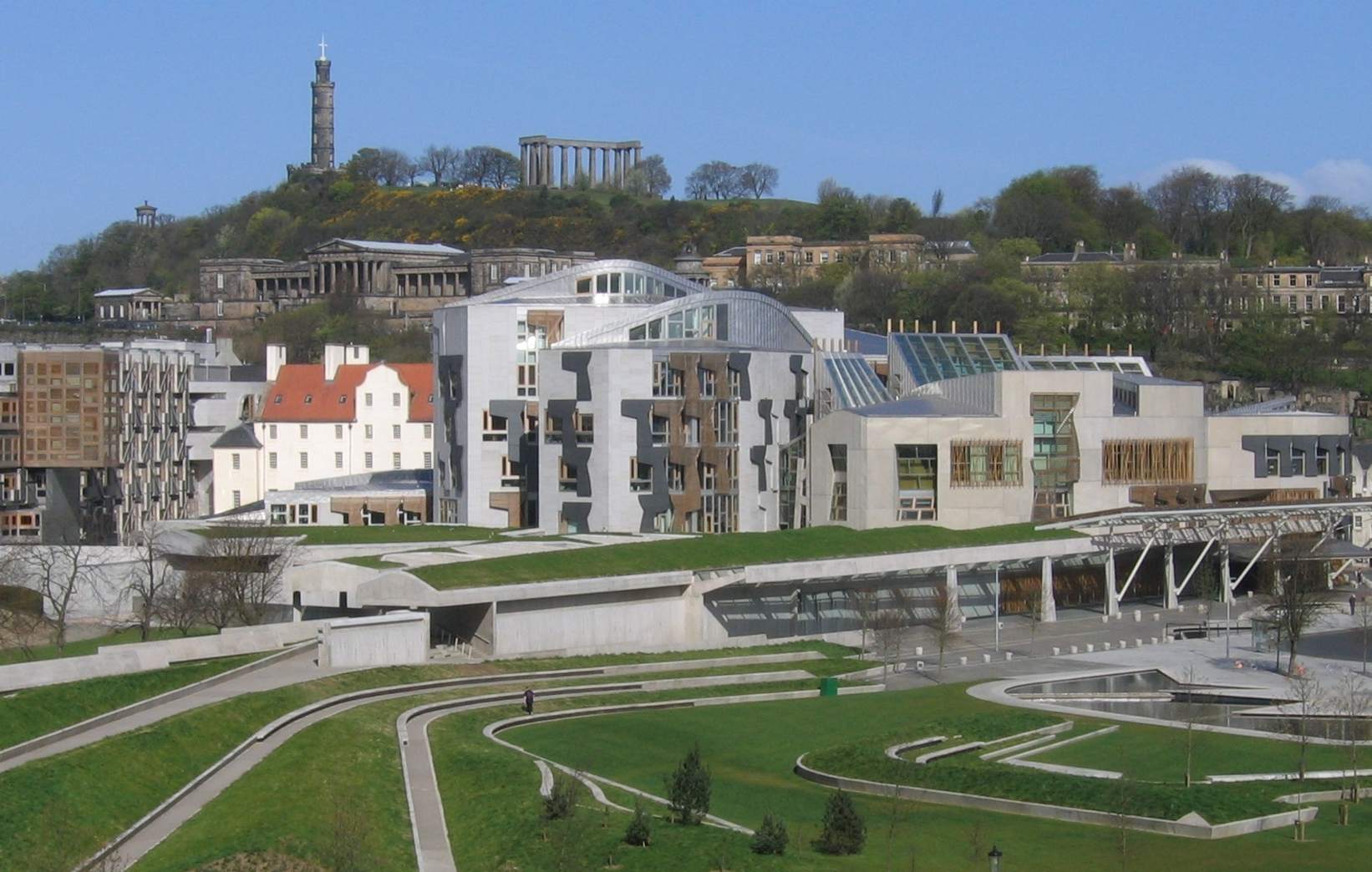
The Scottish Parliament meets at Holyrood in Edinburgh.

The Scottish Parliament is the national, unicameral legislature of Scotland, located in the Holyrood area of the capital, Edinburgh. The Parliament, informally referred to as "Holyrood", is a democratically elected body comprising 129 members known as Members of the Scottish Parliament (MSPs). Of these 73 MSPs are elected using first past the post in single member constituencies and a further 56 MSPs are elected using the D'Hondt method, a form of party-list proportional representation in eight additional member regions with each region electing 7 MSPs.

The Scottish Parliament was convened by the Scotland Act 1998, which sets out its powers as a devolved legislature. The Act delineates the legislative competence of the Parliament – the areas in which it can make laws – by explicitly specifying powers that are "reserved" to the Parliament of the United Kingdom: all matters that are not explicitly reserved are automatically the responsibility of the Scottish Parliament. The British Parliament retains the ability to amend the terms of reference of the Scottish Parliament, and can extend or reduce the areas in which it can make laws. The first meeting of the new Parliament took place on 12 May 1999.

The Scottish Statutory Instruments made by the Scottish Government are another source of legislation. As with Statutory Instruments made by the British government, these are generally subject to either approval or disallowance by the Scottish Parliament

=== Senedd ===
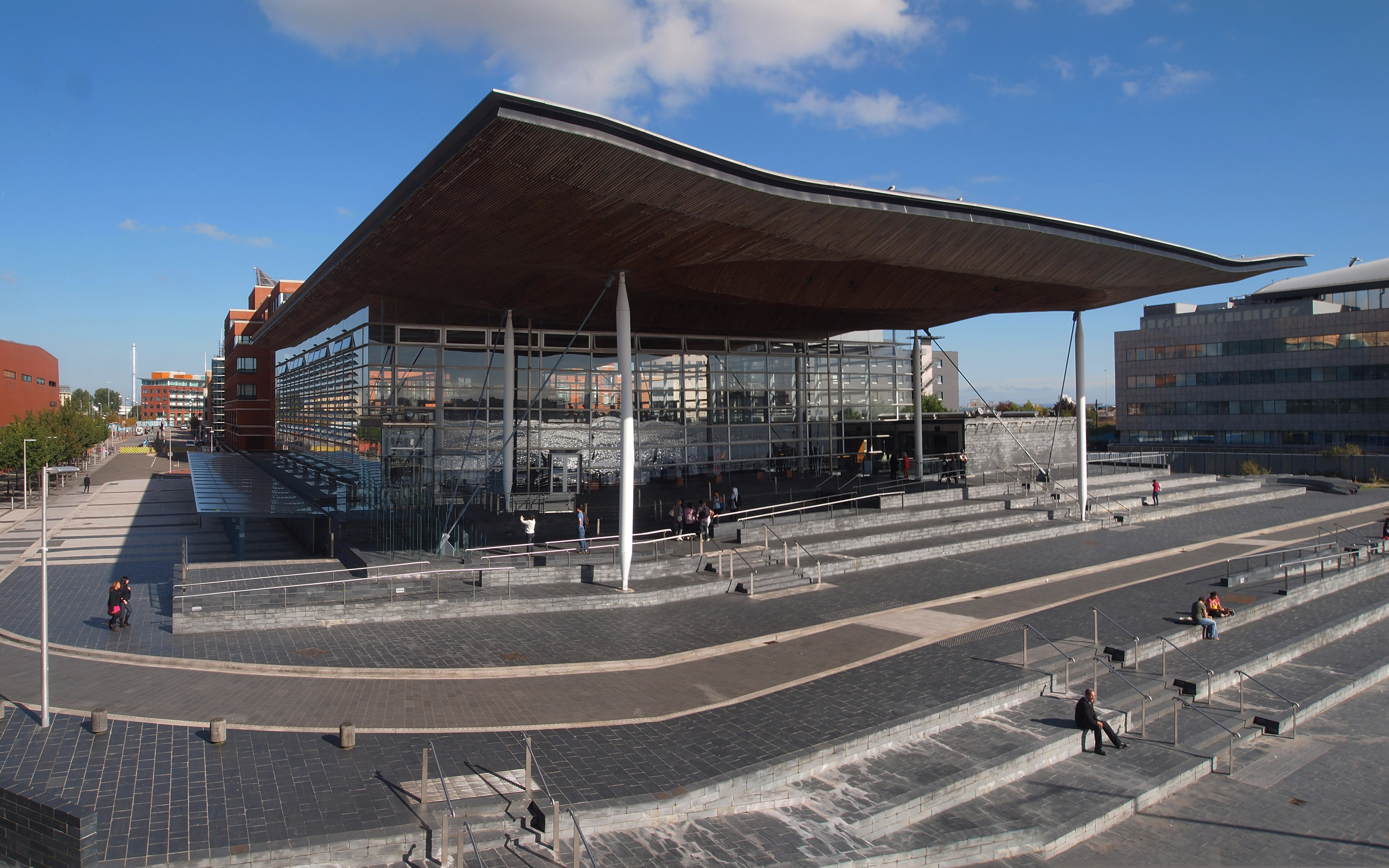
The Welsh Parliament meets in Cardiff.

The Senedd (Welsh Parliament; Welsh: Senedd Cymru) has the power to make legislation in Wales. The parliament was created by the Government of Wales Act 1998, which followed a referendum in 1997. It is a democratically elected body with 60 members known as Members of the Senedd (MSs). Of these 40 MSs are elected using first past the post in single member constituencies and a further 20 MSs are elected using the D'Hondt method, a form of party-list proportional representation in five additional member regions with each region electing 4 MSs.

The Senedd had no powers to initiate primary legislation until limited law-making powers were gained through the Government of Wales Act 2006. Its primary law-making powers were enhanced following a Yes vote in the referendum on 3 March 2011, making it possible for it to legislate in the 20 areas that are devolved without having to consult the UK Parliament, nor the Secretary of State for Wales. The Senedd may delegate authority to enact legislation through Welsh Statutory Instruments. Under the Wales Act 2017 the Senedd came into line with Scotland and Northern Ireland and moved to a reserved powers model.

=== Northern Ireland Assembly ===
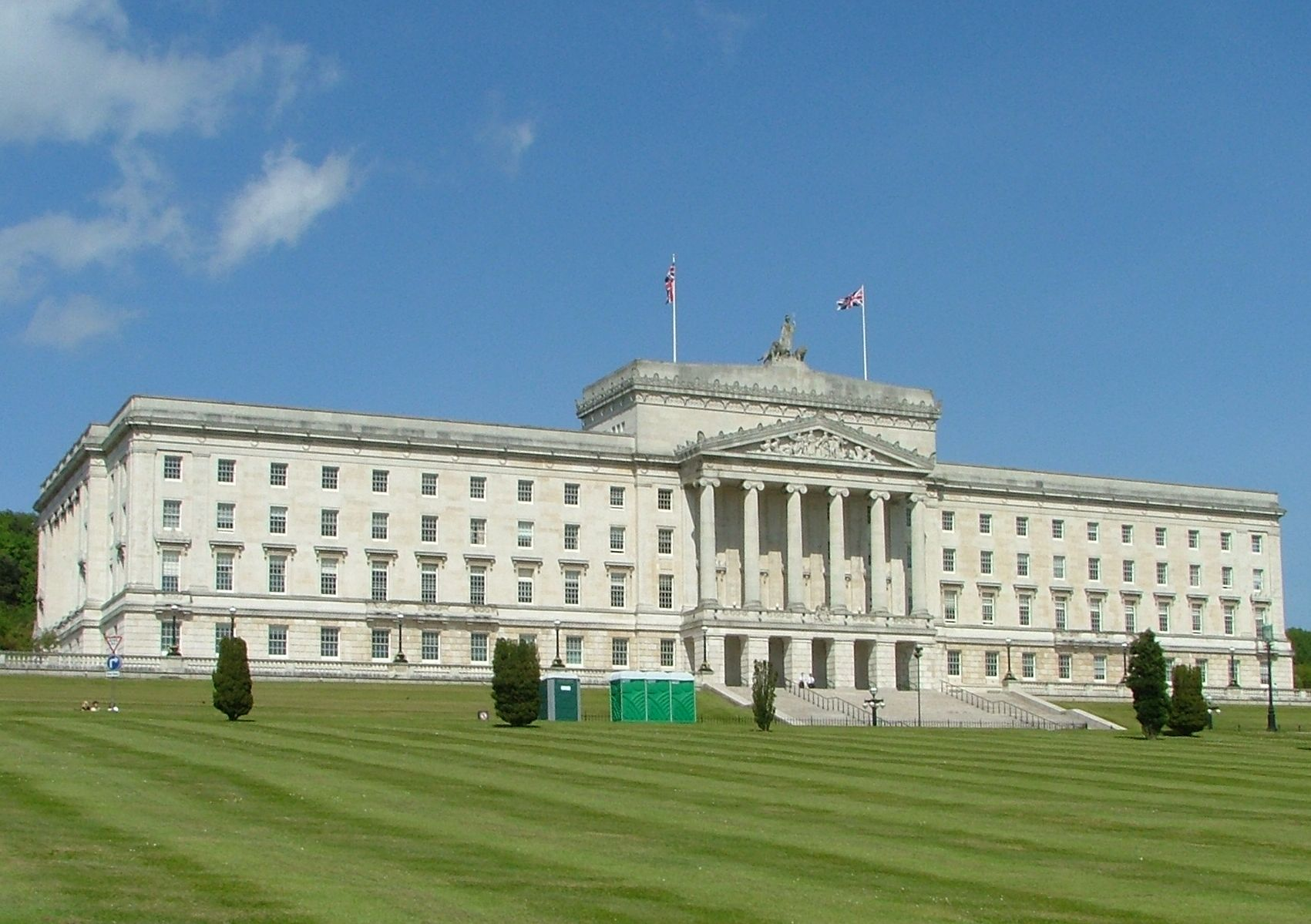
The Northern Ireland Assembly meets at Stormont in Belfast.

The Northern Ireland Assembly is the devolved legislature of Northern Ireland which is a democratically elected body comprising 90 members known as Members of the Legislative Assembly (MLAs). The 90 MLAs are elected using the single transferable vote across the 18 Westminster Parliamentary constituencies with each constituency electing 5 MLAs. It was established in 1998 as part of the Good Friday Agreement which was approved by the public in referendums which were held in both Northern Ireland and in the Republic of Ireland.

It has power to legislate in a wide range of areas that are not explicitly reserved to the Parliament of the United Kingdom, and to appoint the Northern Ireland Executive. It sits at Parliament Buildings at Stormont in Belfast. Legislation of the Assembly empowers the Northern Ireland Executive to issue Statutory Rules in a variety of areas.

The Assembly was dissolved on 26 January 2017 owing to a breakdown of trust which brought down both the Assembly and Executive. In January 2020, Arlene Foster resumed her post as First Minister.

== European Union (1973–2020) ==
The United Kingdom became a member state of the European Union (EU) when it joined what was originally known as the European Communities on 1 January 1973. By virtue of the European Communities Act 1972, EU law applied in the UK, in effect becoming another source of UK legislation. The UK left the EU on 31 January 2020, though EU law were still applicable in the UK until the end of the implementation period on 31 December 2020.

=== The European Parliament ===
The European Parliament (EP) is the directly elected parliamentary institution of the European Union. Together with the Council of the European Union (the council) and the European Commission, it exercises the legislative function of the EU. The Parliament is composed of 751 Members of the European Parliament (MEPs), who represent the second-largest democratic electorate in the world (after the Parliament of India) and the largest trans-national democratic electorate in the world (375 million eligible voters in 2009).

The United Kingdom between 1979 and 2020 used to elect members to the European Parliament, of these a number were elected using the D'Hondt method, a form of party-list proportional representation in 11 former regional constituencies in England, Scotland and Wales while in Northern Ireland 3 MEPs were elected using the single transferable vote in a single national constituency. With the exit of the United Kingdom from the EU all legislation that provided for the holding of elections to the European Parliament as well as the position of Member of the European Parliament (MEP) within the UK was repealed by the European Union (Withdrawal) Act 2018.

== The historical legislatures ==
- Parliament of England (13th century to 1707)
- Parliament of Scotland (13th century to 1707)
- Parliament of Ireland (13th century to 1800)
- Parliament of Great Britain (1707–1800)
- Parliament of Northern Ireland (1921–1972)

== See also ==
- United Kingdom constitutional law
- List of legislation in the United Kingdom
- Acts of Parliament of the United Kingdom relating to the European Communities and the European Union
