= Medical royal college =

Professional body for a medical speciality

In the United Kingdom, some Commonwealth realms and Ireland, a medical royal college is a professional body responsible for the development of and training in one or more medical specialities.

== United Kingdom and Ireland ==
=== Standards and guidance ===
They are generally charged with setting standards within their field and for supervising the training of doctors within that speciality, although the responsibility for the application of those standards in the UK, since 2010, rests with the General Medical Council.

In the United Kingdom and Ireland most medical royal colleges are members of the Academy of Medical Royal Colleges (AoMRC) are listed below, with their postgraduate faculties (some of which are independently members of the academy) and institutes. The Academy of Medical Royal Colleges itself has one faculty of its own – the Faculty of Medical Leadership and Management.

=== International role ===
The Royal Colleges are involved with international activities to improve health through education and training, with some of these efforts coordinated by the International Forum of the AoMRC. The Royal College of General Practitioners has been actively involved on an international level to help family medicine doctors have access to "contextually relevant training and development programmes".

=== History of institutions ===
Medical colleges can seek royal patronage and permission to use the prefix 'royal', usually also having a royal charter.

The letters in brackets are commonly used for or by the institution, for example in post-nominal letters that denote membership or fellowship. Dates in brackets are the year of incorporation by Royal charter. The origins of some of these institutions may predate their incorporation by many years, for example the origins of the Royal College of Surgeons of England may be traced directly to a Guild of Surgeons in the City of London in the fourteenth century.

Some institutions with similar functions are not listed here: they do not have a royal charter and are not members of the Academy of Medical Royal Colleges, for example the Irish Colleges of Anaesthetists, of General Practitioners, of Ophthalmologists and of Psychiatrists.

- Royal College of Anaesthetists
- Royal College of Emergency Medicine
- Royal College of General Practitioners
- Royal College of Obstetricians and Gynaecologists
- Royal College of Ophthalmologists
- Royal College of Paediatrics and Child Health
- Royal College of Paramedics
- Royal College of Pathologists
- Royal College of Physicians
- Royal College of Physicians and Surgeons of Glasgow
- Royal College of Physicians of Edinburgh
- Royal College of Physicians of Ireland
- Royal College of Psychiatrists
- Royal College of Radiologists
- Royal College of Surgeons in Ireland
- Royal College of Surgeons of Edinburgh
- Royal College of Surgeons of England

== Canada ==
- Royal College of Physicians and Surgeons of Canada

== Australia and New Zealand ==
- Royal Australasian College of Surgeons
- Royal Australasian College of Medical Administrators
- Royal Australasian College of Physicians
- Royal Australian and New Zealand College of Obstetricians and Gynaecologists
- Royal Australian and New Zealand College of Ophthalmologists
- Royal Australian and New Zealand College of Psychiatrists
- Royal Australian and New Zealand College of Radiologists
- Royal Australian College of General Practitioners
- Royal New Zealand College of General Practitioners
- Royal College of Pathologists of Australasia
- Royal New Zealand College of Urgent Care
