= Royal College of Ophthalmologists =

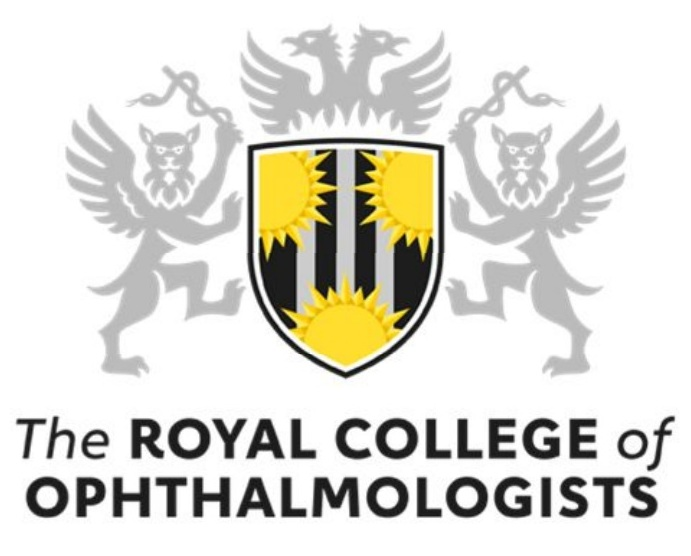
- Established: 14 April 1988
- Headquarters: 18 Stephenson Way, London, England
- Region served: United Kingdom
- President: Mohamed El Alfy
- Affiliations: Academy of Medical Royal Colleges
- Website: www.rcophth.ac.uk

The Royal College of Ophthalmologists, founded in 1988, is an independent professional body and one of the Medical Royal Colleges. They set the standards and examinations for medical doctors aiming to become ophthalmologists, and provide surgical skills training, as well as services to those who have completed their training.

== History ==
Historically, treatments for eye diseases were the preserve of much itinerant charlatanry, such as 'couching', or displacement of dense cataract with a needle, which led to brief improvements but very high complications and blindness in more than 70%, although the Sushruta Samhita described improvements to this as far back as 800 BC. The return of many soldiers from Napoleonic campaigns suffering an epidemic of trachoma, however, spurred the foundation of Moorfields Eye Hospital in 1805 by surgeon John Cunningham Saunders, with encouragement from Astley Cooper.

This led to institutions in Exeter, Bristol and Manchester, and a second in London, by 1816. This in turn led to the opening of ophthalmology departments in general hospitals during the 19th century. Despite this and the appointment of John Freke back in 1727 as the first surgeon specialising in eye diseases, many ophthalmologists of the day did not fully specialise and ophthalmology remained as a branch of general surgery under the ægis of the Royal College of Surgeons of England.

As the specialisation of the field increased, the Ophthalmological Society of the United Kingdom was founded in 1890 by Sir William Bowman, which held annual scientific meetings to further ophthalmic practice. The Faculty of Ophthalmologists was founded as a professional body in 1946 by Sir Stewart Duke-Elder as an offshoot of the Royal College of Surgeons. These two institutions merged in 1988 to form the College of Ophthalmologists; royal licence was granted five years later.

The college was based in 17 Cornwall Terrace, Regent's Park in London, walking distance from the Royal College of Physicians, but has relocated to larger premises in 18–20 Stephenson Way near the Royal College of General Practitioners and Euston Station.

== Today ==
The College sets and examines standards for training as an ophthalmologist in the UK and is the only College whose qualification leads to access to the GMC Specialist Register in Ophthalmology (CCST) and publishes the research journal Eye, part of the Nature Publishing Group. It also represents ophthalmologists working and training in the UK.

Fulfilling the requirements set by the College entitles doctors to the following post-nominal letters in increasing seniority:

- Membership (MRCOphth)
- Fellowship (FRCOphth)

Membership, once a prerequisite for fellowship, is becoming a separate qualification demonstrating core ophthalmological knowledge, as training in the UK has largely eliminated the SHO/registrar distinction in the field. Fellowship of the college (or its Scottish equivalents) is a necessary (but not sufficient) prerequisite for qualifying from training in the UK. It is also considered broadly equivalent to similar qualifications in the Commonwealth such as FRANZCO and the FRCSI (Ophth).

As a surgical speciality, and having originated as part of the Royal College of Surgeons, fellows generally take the title Mr, Mrs, Miss or Ms, rather than Dr, although there are exceptions.

The college also offers the Certificate in Laser Refractive Surgery as an additional qualification, and the Duke-Elder Prize Examination, a yearly competitive examination for medical undergraduates in the United Kingdom and the Republic of Ireland.

The president to 2020 was Michael Burdon, who has passed the role on to Bernie Chang.

In January 2020 Mike Burdon, the college President at the time, said the specialty was in a “predictable mess” after it was reported that large numbers of patients had suffered permanent or long-term harm to their eyes after waiting too long for a follow-up appointment. He said “fundamentally there are not enough doctors, equipment or space”. There were 150 vacant posts for consultant ophthalmologists because there not enough training posts. Increases in the number of patients with glaucoma, macular degeneration and diabetic retinopathy has led to increased demand of around 6% a year.
