= Health Research Authority =

Non-departmental public body in England

- Applies to: England
- Relates to: Health research

Other UK counterparts
- Northern Ireland: Health and Social Care
- Scotland: NHS Research Scotland
- Wales: Health and Care Research Wales

Health Research Authority logo

The Health Research Authority (HRA) is an arm's length body of the Department of Health and Social Care (DHSC) in England. The HRA exists to provide a unified national system for the governance of health research. The current chair of the HRA is Professor Sir Terence Stephenson, who succeeded Sir Jonathan Montgomery.

== History ==
The formation of the HRA came as a result of reorganisation of the National Health Service (NHS) of England outlined in the Health and Social Care Act 2012, and took on the functions of the National Research Ethics Service. Originally established as a special health authority on 1 December 2011, it became a non-departmental public body on 1 January 2015 in accordance with section 109 of the Care Act 2014.

== See also ==
- National Institute for Health and Care Research (NIHR)
- Medical Research Council
- National Institute for Health and Care Excellence (NICE)
