= Faculty of Medical Leadership and Management =

- Formation: 17 October 2011
- Location(s): London, WC1R; United Kingdom
- Members: 2,600
- Chief Executive Officer: Rich Withnall
- Website: www.fmlm.ac.uk

The Faculty of Medical Leadership and Management (FMLM) is an intercollegiate professional body which promotes excellence in leadership on behalf of all doctors in the United Kingdom. The faculty was formed in 2011 and has 2,600 members, who are Members or accredited as Fellows in increasing seniority: Associate Fellow (AFFMLM), Fellow (FFMLM) or Senior Fellow (SFFMLM).

== History ==
The faculty was established in October 2011 by all the medical royal colleges and faculties with endorsement from the Academy of Medical Royal Colleges (AoMRC). As a professional body for the setting and maintaining of standards, the faculty was seen as having an important role in helping medical leaders to be seen as skilled professionals rather than gifted amateurs.

It maintains a vision: 'to inspire and promote excellence in medical leadership to drive continuous improvement in health and healthcare in the UK.'

The chief executive officer is Professor Rich Withnall, one of the UK's most senior medical leaders whose career has included military service across multiple continents, advising the UK Government on national medical emergencies, and serving as Honorary Surgeon to Their Majesties Queen Elizabeth II and King Charles III. Prior to his position at FMLM, he served as Director of Defence Healthcare, UK Ministry of Defence.

At its inception, the faculty put forward the view that medical leadership would have to become a true professional discipline to be able to deal with the challenges which the health service faces.

The faculty has also commented on creating the right culture within organisations that provide healthcare and training.

== Governance ==
The current CEO is Rich Withnall.

FMLM is governed by a board of trustees.

While the organisation was becoming established, the faculty's governing body was the Founding Council, with representatives drawn from all of the member colleges and faculties. This arrangement was in place from May 2011 until March 2013, at which point the new Council took over. In January 2014, a board of trustees was established.
