= John Tooke =

British medical researcher (born 1949)

Professor Sir John Tooke FRCP FRCPI FRCGP FMedSci

Professor of Medicine, University College London
- In office 2010–2023

Professor of Vascular Medicine, University of Exeter
- In office 1992–2009

Personal details
- Born: John Edward Tooke; 4 March 1949 (age 77)
- Occupation: Physician, medical researcher

Sir John Edward Tooke (born 4 March 1949) is the Head of the School of Life & Medical Sciences at University College, London. He formerly worked at the Peninsula College of Medicine and Dentistry where he was the Inaugural Dean, and of the Peninsula Medical School which was its first constituent. He was President of the Academy of Medical Sciences from 2011 to 2015.

== Career ==
Tooke graduated in medicine from St John's College, Oxford in 1974 and went on to become a Wellcome Trust Senior Lecturer in Medicine and Physiology and Honorary Consultant Physician at Charing Cross and Westminster Medical School before moving to the Postgraduate Medical School of the University of Exeter in 1987. His clinical and research interests are in diabetes and vascular medicine, and he built a research team in these areas at Exeter. In 1998 he led the bid for the development of the Peninsula Medical School and was appointed its Inaugural Dean in 2000. Tooke also led the bid for the creation of the Peninsula Dental School, of which he was the inaugural Executive Dean until 2009.

In June 2009, it was announced that Tooke would be taking up the position of Vice Provost (Health), Head of the School of Life & Medical Sciences and Head of the Medical School at University College London.

Tooke was elected President of the Academy of Medical Sciences in November 2011. He stood down in December 2015 and was succeeded by Robert Lechler.

Tooke led the inquiry into Modernising Medical Careers (MMC), the post-graduate training structure for medical doctors in the UK. His report strongly criticises the UK Government's handling of the MMC implementation. The "Tooke report" suggests scrapping MMC and starting with a new system which is based on extensive consultation with medical professional bodies and practitioners.

== Honours ==
Tooke was knighted in the 2007 New Year Honours for services to medicine.

Educational offices
| Preceded by Sir John Irving Bell | President of the Academy of Medical Sciences; 2011 to 2015 | Succeeded by Sir Robert Lechler |
