= General Medical Council =

Healthcare regulator for medical profession in the UK

- Formation: 1858; 168 years ago
- Type: Charitable organisation
- Purpose: Medical licensing
- Headquarters: Regent's Place, Euston Road, London
- Region served: United Kingdom
- Staff: 1,236 (2018)
- Website: www.gmc-uk.org

The General Medical Council (GMC) is a public body that maintains the official register of medical practitioners within the United Kingdom. Its chief responsibility is to "protect, promote and maintain the health and safety of the public" by controlling entry to the register, and suspending or removing members when necessary. It also sets the standards for medical schools in the UK. Making a false claim of membership is a criminal offence. The GMC is supported by member fees and became a registered charity in 2001.

== History ==
The Medical Act 1858 established the General Council of Medical Education and Registration of the United Kingdom as a statutory body.

== Purpose ==
All the GMC's functions derive from a statutory requirement for the establishment and maintenance of a register, which is the definitive list of doctors as provisionally or fully "registered medical practitioners", within the public sector in Britain. The GMC controls entry to the List of Registered Medical Practitioners ("the medical register"). The Medical Act 1983 (amended) notes that, "The main objective of the General Council in exercising their functions is to protect, promote and maintain the health and safety of the public."

Secondly, the GMC regulates and sets the standards for medical schools in the UK, and liaises with other nations' medical and university regulatory bodies over medical schools overseas, leading to some qualifications being mutually recognised. Since 2010, it has also regulated postgraduate medical education.

Thirdly, the GMC is responsible for a licensing and revalidation system for all practising doctors in the UK, separate from the registration system, since 3 December 2012.

== Activities and powers ==
Due to the principle of autonomy and law of consent there is no legislative restriction on who can treat patients or provide medical or health-related services. In other words, it is not a criminal offence to provide what would be considered medical assistance or treatment to another person – and not just in an emergency. This is in contrast with the position in respect of animals, where it is a criminal offence under the Veterinary Surgeons Act 1966 for someone who is not a registered veterinary surgeon (or in certain more limited circumstances a registered veterinary nurse) to provide treatment (save in an emergency) to an animal they do not own.

Parliament, since the enactment of the 1858 Act, has conferred on the GMC powers to grant various legal benefits and responsibilities to those medical practitioners who are registered with the GMC – a public body and association, as described, of the Medical Act 1983, by Mr Justice Burnett in British Medical Association v General Medical Council.

Registration brings with it the privileges, as they are described, set out in Part 6 of the Act. In reality, they comprise prohibitions for all those not registered. Section 46 prohibits any person from recovering in a court of law any charge rendered for medical advice, attendance or surgery unless he is registered. Section 47 provides that only those registered can act as physicians, surgeons or medical officers in any NHS hospital, prison, in the armed forces or other public institutions. Section 48 invalidates certificates, such as sick notes or prescriptions, if signed by someone who is unregistered. Section 49 imposes penalties via criminal offences for pretending to be a registered medical practitioner.

Through which, by an Order in the Privy Council, the GMC describes "The main objective of the General Council in exercising their functions is to protect, promote and maintain the health and safety of the public".

The GMC is funded by annual fees required from those wishing to remain registered and fees for examinations.

In 2011, following the Command Paper "Enabling Excellence-Autonomy and Accountability for Healthcare Workers, Social Workers and Social Care Workers", registration fees were reduced by the GMC in accordance with the Government's strategy for reforming and simplifying the system for regulating healthcare workers in the UK and social workers and social care workers in England and requiring that "[A]t a time of pay restraint in both the public and private sectors, the burden of fees on individual registrants needs to be minimised."

=== Registering doctors in the UK ===
The GMC maintains a register of medical practitioners. However, no law expressly prohibits any unregistered or unqualified person from practicing most types of medicine or even surgery. A criminal offence is committed only when such a person deliberately and falsely represents himself as being a registered practitioner or as having a medical qualification. The rationale of the criminal law is that people should be free to opt for any form of advice or treatment, however bizarre...

Registration with the GMC confers a number of privileges and duties. GMC registration may be either provisional or full. Provisional registration is granted to those who have completed medical school and enter their first year (FY1) of medical training; this may be converted into full registration upon satisfactory completion of the first year of postgraduate training. In the past, a third type of registration ("limited registration") was granted to doctors who had graduated outside the UK and who had completed the Professional and Linguistic Assessments Board examination but who were yet to complete a period of work in the UK. Limited registration was abolished on 19 October 2007, and now international medical graduates can apply for provisional or full registration depending on their level of experience – they still have to meet the GMC's requirement for knowledge and skills and for English language.

The form and content of the register is specified in The General Medical Council (Form and Content of the Register) Regulations 2015. Details recorded include name, address, date of qualification, gender, date of birth, photograph, fitness to practice history, restrictions and whether or not they hold a licence to practice.

A registered practitioner found to have committed some offences can be removed from ("struck off") the medical register.

=== Licensing and revalidating doctors in the UK ===
The GMC is now empowered to license and regularly revalidate the practice of doctors in the UK. When the licensing scheme was introduced in 2009, 13,500 (6.1%) of registered doctors chose not to be licensed. Unlicensed but registered doctors are likely to be non-practising lecturers, managers, or practising overseas, or retired. Whereas all registered doctors in the UK were offered a one-off automatic practise licence in November 2009, since December 2012, no licence will be automatically revalidated, but will be subject to a revalidation process every five years. No doctor may now be registered for the first time without also being issued a licence to practice.

=== Setting standards of good medical practice ===
The GMC sets standards of professional and ethical conduct that doctors in the UK are required to follow. The main guidance that the GMC provides for doctors is called Good Medical Practice. This outlines the standard of professional conduct that the public expects from its doctors and provides principles that underpin the GMC's fitness-to-practise decisions. Originally written in 1995, a revised edition came into force in November 2006, and another with effect from 22 April 2013. The content of Good Medical Practice has been rearranged into four domains of duties. Their most significant change is the replacement of a duty to, "Act without delay if you have good reason to believe that you or a colleague may be putting patients at risk," to a new duty to, "Take prompt action if you think that patient safety, dignity or comfort is being compromised". Alongside the guidance booklet are a range of explanatory guidelines, including a new one about the use of social media. The GMC also provides additional guidance for doctors on specific ethical topics, such as treating patients under the age of 18, end-of-life care, and conflicts of interest.

=== Medical education ===
The GMC regulates medical education and training in the United Kingdom. It runs 'quality assurance' programmes for UK medical schools and postgraduate deaneries to ensure that the necessary standards and outcomes are achieved.

In February 2008 the then Secretary of State for Health, Alan Johnson, agreed with recommendations of the Tooke Report which advised that the Postgraduate Medical Education and Training Board should be assimilated into the GMC. Whilst recognising the achievements made by PMETB, Professor John Tooke concluded that regulation needed to be combined into one body; that there should be one organisation that looked after what he called "the continuum of medical education", from the moment someone chooses a career in medicine until the point that they retire. The merger, which took effect on 1 April 2010, was welcomed by both PMETB and the GMC.

=== Misconduct and fitness to practise ===
A registered medical practitioner may be referred to the GMC if there are doubts about their fitness to practise. The GMC is concerned with ensuring that doctors are safe to practise. Its role is not, for example, to fine doctors or to compensate patients following problems (compensation might be addressed through a medical malpractice lawsuit). The outcomes of hearings are made available on the GMC website.

Historically the handling of concerns had two streams: one regarding health, the other about conduct or ability, but these streams have been merged, into a single fitness-to-practice process. The GMC has powers to issue advice or warnings to doctors, accept undertakings from them, or refer them to a fitness-to-practise panel. The GMC's fitness-to-practise panels can accept undertakings from a doctor, issue warnings, impose conditions on a doctor's practice, suspend a doctor, or remove them from the medical register (when they are said to be 'struck off').

=== Emergency driving ===
Gaining registration with the GMC (whether provisional or full) also allows the registrant to fit and utilise green flashing lights to their car. Such lights can be used when attending a medical emergency to alert other road users to their presence and intentions. They can also make a doctor's car more visible if they have stopped at an accident scene.

== Reform ==
Since 2001, the GMC's fitness-to-practise decisions have been subject to review by the Council for Healthcare Regulatory Excellence (CHRE), which may vary sentences.

The GMC is also accountable to the Parliament of the United Kingdom through the Health and Social Care Select Committee. In its first report on the GMC, the Committee described the GMC as "a high-performing medical regulator", but called for some changes to fitness-to-practice rules and practices, including allowing the GMC the right to appeal sentences of its panels.

In the 2000s, the GMC implemented wide-ranging reforms of its organisation and procedures. In part, such moves followed the Shipman killings. They followed a direction set by the UK government in its white paper, Trust, Assurance and Safety. In 2001, freemasonry was added to the register of interests of council members that the GMC published. One of the key changes was to reduce the size of the council itself, and changing its composition to an equal number of medical and lay members, rather than the majority being doctors. Legislation passed in December 2002, allowed changes in the composition of the council from the following year, with the number of members reducing from 104 to 35, increasing the proportion of lay members.

In July 2011, the GMC accepted further changes that would separate its presentation of fitness-to-practise cases from their adjudication, which would become the responsibility of a new body, the Medical Practitioners Tribunal Service. The GMC had previously been criticised for combining these two roles in a single organisation.

As of 2012, doctors' licence to practice is subject to periodic revalidation, overseen and regulated by the GMC. Practicing doctors take part in annual appraisals and collate a portfolio of evidence, reflection and continuous learning, which is assessed by a suitable medical professional and presented to the GMC to demonstrate continuous fitness to practice.

On 16 February 2011, the Secretary of State for Health, Andrew Lansley, made a Written Ministerial Statement in the Justice section entitled 'Health Care Workers, Social Workers and Social Care Workers' in which he said:

I have today laid before Parliament a Command Paper, "Enabling Excellence-Autonomy and Accountability for Healthcare Workers, Social Workers and Social Care Workers" (Cm 8008) setting out the Government's proposals for how the system for regulating health care workers across the United Kingdom and social workers in England should be reformed.

Within the Command paper:

Should any regulators wish to propose mergers with other regulatory bodies to reduce costs as part of this work, the Government will view these proposals sympathetically. If the sector itself is unable to identify and secure significant cost reductions over the next three years, and contain registration fees, then the Government will revisit the issue of consolidating the sector into a more cost-effective configuration.

Sir Liam Donaldson, a former chief medical officer had recently told the Mid Staffordshire Foundation Trust public inquiry that he had been involved in discussions about the Nursing and Midwifery Council merging with the GMC, but proponents had "backed off" from the idea and the Council for Healthcare Regulatory Excellence was created instead to share best practice. Donaldson said the CHRE had been "reasonably successful" but it would be "worth looking at the possibility of a merger" between the GMC and NMC.

== Criticism ==
=== Self-regulation and handling of complaints ===
Concern has resulted from several studies that suggest that the GMC's handling of complaints appears to differ depending on race or overseas qualifications, but it has been argued that this might be due to indirect factors. However a ruling on 18 June 2021 by a UK court for the first time found the GMC guilty of racial discrimination in its disciplinary procedures.

The mortality and morbidity among doctors going through GMC procedures has attracted attention. In 2003/4 between 4 and 5% of doctors undergoing fitness to practice scrutiny died. In response to a request for information in accordance with the Freedom of Information Act 2000, the GMC revealed that 68 doctors had died recently whilst undergoing a fitness to practice investigation,

In an internal report, "Doctors Who Commit Suicide While Under GMC Fitness to Practise Investigation", the GMC identified 114 doctors, with a median age of 45, who had died during the previous nine years, and had an open and disclosed GMC case at the time of death, and in which 28 had died by (24) or attempted (4) suicide and recommended 'emotional resilience' training for doctors.

In a warning on "over-regulation" Dr Clare Gerada, a former chair of the Royal College of General Practitioners, commented:

We already spend up to one billion pounds regulating doctors. We are one of the most over-regulated professions around and there will always be people who fall through. If we pile on more and more regulation, we will never win.

Following the suicide of Professor John E Davies from Guy's Hospital, London, HM Senior Coroner for the area wrote to Niall Dickson with her Regulation 28: Report to Prevent Future Deaths:

This is the second death of a doctor that has come before me over the last 2 years where a GMC investigation into the doctor's practice has been found to play a part.

Academics at King's College London researched the effects of increased regulatory transparency on the medical profession and found significant unintended consequences. As doctors reacted anxiously to regulation and media headlines, they practised more defensively.

=== Charitable status ===
The GMC was registered as a charity with the Charity Commission of England and Wales on 9 November 2001. The Commissioners having considered the court and the Commission's jurisdiction to consider an organisation's status, which had previously been considered by the courts, in issues of charitable status.

Charities do not normally have to pay income tax or corporation tax, capital gains tax or stamp duty. Following the granting of charitable status the GMC obtained tax relief backdated to 1 April 1994. Charities pay no more than 20% of normal business rates on the buildings they use and occupy. The GMC received confirmation of 80% business rates relief effective from April 1995.

As of 2014, the accounts submitted by the GMC to the Charity Commission showed an income of £97 million, spending of £101M with reserves of £68M.

=== Shipman inquiry ===
The GMC was most heavily criticised by Dame Janet Smith as part of her inquiry into the issues arising from the case of Dr Harold Shipman. "Expediency," says Smith, "replaced principle." Dame Janet maintained that the GMC failed to deal properly with Fitness to Practise (FTP) cases, particularly involving established and respected doctors.

In response to the Shipman report, Sir Liam Donaldson, the then Chief Medical Officer, published a report titled Good doctors, safer patients, which appeared in 2006. Donaldson echoed concerns about GMC FTP procedures and other functions of the council. In his view, complaints were dealt with in a haphazard manner, the GMC caused distress to doctors over trivial complaints while tolerating poor practice in other cases. He accused the council of being "secretive, tolerant of sub-standard practice and dominated by the professional interest, rather than that of the patient". Former president of the GMC, Sir Donald Irvine, called for the current council to be disbanded and re-formed with new members.

=== Penny Mellor ===
In July 2010, the GMC was severely criticised in an open letter in the British Medical Journal by Professionals Against Child Abuse for the decision to include Penny Mellor on the GMC's Expert Group on Child Protection. According to the letter, Mellor had been convicted and imprisoned for conspiring to abduct a child, and had led protracted hostile campaigns including false allegations against doctors and other professionals involved in child protection cases. She had also campaigned against Sir Roy Meadow and Professor David Southall, who were erased from the medical register by the GMC but subsequently re-instated after court rulings. Mellor subsequently resigned from the Expert Group.

=== John Walker-Smith ===
In March 2012, the High Court of England and Wales overturned a 2010 decision by the GMC to strike paediatric gastroenterologist John Walker-Smith off the medical register for serious professional misconduct. In his ruling, the presiding judge criticised what he said were the GMC's "inadequate and superficial reasoning and, in a number of instances, a wrong conclusion," and stated, "It would be a misfortune if this were to happen again."

=== Junior doctors contract ===
Controversy arose in July 2016, when the GMC announced it would be appointing Charlie Massey as its new CEO. Massey had been an adviser to health secretary Jeremy Hunt on the controversial Junior doctors contract, which had led to several days of industrial action by doctors over concerns about feasibility and patient safety. Many doctors felt this reflected a clear conflict of interest and signed a petition to the medical council for transparency in its appointment process. The medical council issued a response claiming that they were still an independent body. Massey had also signally failed to distinguish himself in front of the Public Accounts Committee of Parliament.

== Officers ==
The council is composed of six medical professionals and six lay members. All members are appointed by the Privy Council. The current Chair is Dame Carrie MacEwen who has served since May 2022. The current chief executive and registrar is Charlie Massey.

Christine Murrell was the first woman elected to the GMC in 1933, however she died before she could take her seat. In 1950, Hilda Lloyd became the first female member of the council. In 2019, Clare Marx became the first female chair of the council.

== Other regulators of healthcare professionals ==
The Professional Standards Authority for Health and Social Care (PSA), is an independent body accountable to the UK Parliament, with the remit to promote the health and well-being of patients and the public in the regulation of health professionals. But the PSA does not have legal power to investigate complaints about regulators. It advises the four UK government health departments on issues relating to the regulation of health professionals; scrutinising and overseeing the work of the nine regulatory bodies:

- Health and Care Professions Council (regulates other health professions in the UK)
- Nursing and Midwifery Council (regulates nurses and midwives)
- General Optical Council
- General Dental Council
- General Chiropractic Council
- General Osteopathic Council
- General Pharmaceutical Council
- Pharmaceutical Society of Northern Ireland
- General Medical Council
