= 2007 Birthday Honours =

British government recognitions

The Birthday Honours 2007 for the Commonwealth realms were announced on 17 June 2007, to celebrate the Queen's Birthday of 2007.

The recipients of honours are displayed here as they were styled before their new honour, and arranged first by the country whose ministers advised the Queen on the appointments, then by honour, with classes (Knight, Knight Grand Cross, etc.) and then divisions (Military, Civil, etc.) as appropriate.

== United Kingdom ==
=== Knight Bachelor ===
- John William Baker, CBE, Chair, Senior Salaries Review Body and Public Services Remuneration Committee. For public service.
- Professor Christopher Alan Bayly, Vere Harmsworth Professor of Imperial and Naval History, University of Cambridge. For services to History.
- Ian Terence Botham, OBE. For services to Charity and to Cricket.
- Rodney George Brooke, CBE, DL, Chair, General Social Care Council. For public service.
- Stephen Michael Bullock, Mayor, London Borough of Lewisham. For services to Local Government.
- William Henry Callaghan, JP, Chair, Health and Safety Commission. For services to Health and Safety.
- Peter Derek Carr, CBE, DL, Chair, North East Strategic Health Authority. For services to the NHS.
- Professor George Castledine, Professor of Nursing, University of Central England and Consultant of Nursing, Dudley Group of Hospitals NHS Trust. For services to Healthcare.
- Professor Peter Frederic Chester Cook, Architect and Teacher. For services to Architecture.
- Charles Ireland Gray, CBE, JP, lately Convenor of Education, North Lanarkshire Council. For services to Education.
- John Kevin Hegarty, Creative Director and Chair, Bartle Bogle Hegarty Ltd. For services to the Advertising Industry.
- Professor Brian John Hoskins, CBE, FRS, Professor of Meteorology, University of Reading. For services to Environmental Science.
- Paul Joseph Scott-Lee, QPM, DL, Chief Constable, West Midlands Police. For services to the Police.
- Professor David Melville, CBE, Vice-Chancellor, University of Kent. For services to Higher and Further Education.
- Torquil Patrick Alexander Norman, CBE, Founder, Roundhouse Trust. For services to the Arts and to Disadvantaged Young People.
- Professor David John Read, Vice-President and Biological Secretary, Royal Society. For services to Biological Sciences.
- Richard Ellis Meuric Rees, CBE. For services to Agriculture and to Public Life in Wales.
- Arthur James Rose, CBE, Education Consultant and Chair, Review of Teaching of Early Reading. For services to Education.
- Norman Leon Rosenthal, Exhibitions Secretary, Royal Academy of Arts. For services to Art.
- Ahmed Salman Rushdie, Author. For services to Literature.
- George Malcolm Williamson, Chair, CDC Group plc. For services to the Financial Services Industry.

=== Order of the Bath ===
==== Knight Grand Cross of the Order of the Bath (GCB) ====
Civil Division

- The Right Honourable Sir Robin Berry Janvrin, KCB, KCVO, Private Secretary to The Queen and Keeper of The Queen's Archives.

==== Knight Commander of the Order of the Bath (KCB) ====
Military Division

- Air Marshal Barry Michael Thornton, CB, Royal Air Force.

Civil Division

- Paul David Grenville Hayter, LVO, Clerk of the Parliaments, House of Lords.
- Leigh Warren Lewis, CB, Permanent Secretary, Department for Work and Pensions.

==== Companion of the Order of the Bath (CB) ====
Military Division

- Rear Admiral Kim John Borley.
- Vice Admiral Timothy James Hamilton Laurence, MVO.
- Major General Nicholas Jeremy Cottam, OBE, (495980), late The Royal Green Jackets.
- Air Vice-Marshal Nigel Alexander Bairsto, MBE, Royal Air Force.
- Air Vice-Marshal Paul David Rawson, Royal Air Force.

Civil Division

- Stephen Aldridge, Director, Prime Minister's Strategy Unit, Cabinet Office.
- Helen Janet, Lady Caldwell, Parliamentary Counsel, Parliamentary Counsel Office.
- Thomas Anthony Cameron, lately Chief Executive, Scottish Prison Service.
- Susan Margaret Haird, Deputy Chief Executive, UK Trade and Investment, Department of Trade and Industry.
- Martin Lloyd Howard, Director-General, Operational Policy, Ministry of Defence.
- Stephen William Jones, lately Acting Chief Finance Officer, HM Revenue and Customs.
- Stephen James Leach, Grade 2, Northern Ireland Office.
- Douglas George Millar, Clerk Assistant, House of Commons.
- Terence Anthony Moran, Chief Executive, Disability and Carers Service, Department for Work and Pensions.
- Mark Edward Ormerod, Director, Civil, Family and Customer Services, Her Majesty's Courts Service, Ministry of Justice.
- Adam Sharples, Director-General, Work, Welfare and Equality Group, Department for Work and Pensions.
- Nikita Tompkinson, Director, Transport Security, Department for Transport.

=== Order of Saint Michael and Saint George ===
==== Knight Grand Cross of the Order of St Michael and St George (GCMG) ====
- Sir Emyr Jones Parry, KCMG, UK Permanent Representative to the United Nations, New York.

==== Knight Commander of the Order of St Michael and St George (KCMG) ====
- Anthony Russell Brenton, CMG, HM Ambassador, Moscow.
- Julian Gordon Priestley, lately Secretary-General, European Parliament.
- Robert John Sawers, CMG, lately Director-General Political, Foreign and Commonwealth Office.

==== Companion of the Order of St Michael and St George (CMG) ====
- Philip Robert Barton, OBE, Deputy Governor, Gibraltar.
- James Richard Cadwallader, Counsellor, Foreign and Commonwealth Office.
- Professor Elisabeth Croll. For services to Higher Education, especially in promoting understanding of China's social development.
- David William Fall, H.M. Ambassador, Bangkok.
- Peter Olaf Gooderham, Director, Middle East and North Africa Directorate, Foreign and Commonwealth Office.
- Oleg Antonovich Gordievsky. For services to the security of the United Kingdom.
- The Right Reverend George Clive Handford, lately Bishop in Cyprus and The Gulf, Presiding Bishop of the Province of Jerusalem. For services to promoting inter-faith dialogue in the Arab world.
- Nicholas Peter Kay, Senior Foreign and Commonwealth Office Representative, South Afghanistan.
- David Geoffrey Lang, CBE, QC, lately Attorney-General, the Falkland Islands, South Georgia and the South Sandwich Islands.
- Siobhan Peters, lately Leader of the Stern Review Team on the Economics of Climate Change, H.M. Treasury.
- Andrew James Sparkes, H.M. Ambassador, Kinshasa.

=== Royal Victorian Order ===
==== Knight Commander of the Royal Victorian Order (KCVO) ====
- The Most Honourable David George Philip, The Marquess of Cholmondeley, Lord Great Chamberlain.

==== Commander of the Royal Victorian Order (CVO) ====
- Dr. June Paterson-Brown, CBE, JP, formerly Lord Lieutenant of Roxburgh, Ettrick and Lauderdale.
- Christopher Edward Wollaston MacKenzie Geidt, OBE, Deputy Private Secretary to The Queen.
- Michael Charles William Norreys Jephson, LVO, Chief Clerk, Master of the Household's Department, Royal Household.
- George Robert Marwick, JP, formerly Lord Lieutenant of Orkney.
- Cameron Holdsworth Parker, OBE, formerly Lord Lieutenant of Renfrewshire.
- David Logan Stewart, WS, formerly Solicitor to The Queen in Scotland.

==== Lieutenant of the Royal Victorian Order (LVO) ====
- Andrew Bruce Crichton, MVO, formerly Operations Co-ordinator, Household of the Prince of Wales and the Duchess of Cornwall.
- Annabel Frances Dunkels, Director of Public Relations and Marketing, Royal Collection Enterprises.
- The Reverend Canon Michael John Derek Irving, formerly Trustee, Outward Bound Trust.
- Simon Nicholas Henry Hayward Knapp, Veterinary Surgeon, Royal Mews.
- Air Vice-Marshal David Richard Hawkins-Leth, CB, MBE, formerly Gentleman Usher to The Queen.
- The Reverend Canon John Anthony Ovenden, Chaplain, The Royal Chapel, Windsor Great Park.
- Stephen James Patterson, MVO, Computer Systems Manager, Royal Collection.
- Lieutenant Colonel Conway John Edward Seymour. For services to Prince Philip, Duke of Edinburgh.
- David Malcolm Thomas, CBE, Chairman, In Kind Direct.
- Christopher Tummon, Private Secretary and ADC to the Lieutenant Governor of the Isle of Man.
- Tipo Vuatha, MBE, formerly Official Secretary to the Governor-General of Papua New Guinea.
- Miriam Ray Watts, Head of Personnel and Administration, Household of The Prince of Wales and The Duchess of Cornwall.

==== Member of the Royal Victorian Order (MVO) ====
- The Reverend Paul Robert Carrington Abram, Chaplain, HM Tower of London.
- Elizabeth Ash, Secretary to the Lord Chamberlain.
- Inspector Christopher John Collins, Metropolitan Police. For services to Royalty Protection.
- Megan Gent, RVM, Paper Conservator, Royal Archives.
- Nigel George Goldsmith, RVM, Deputy Assistant, C Branch, Master of the Household's Department.
- Roger Edward Harman, formerly Headmaster, Flitcham School, Norfolk.
- Valerie Hill, Assistant to the Clerk of the Lieutenancy of Suffolk.
- Mark David Howard, Deputy Information Systems Manager, Royal Household.
- Martin Elliott Keene, Picture Editor, Press Association.
- Joseph Norman Maggs, Senior Travel Assistant, Royal Travel Office, Royal Household.
- Carol Janet de Rhé-Philipe, Senior Assistant, Wiltshire County Council.
- Alastair Stanley Douglas Service, CBE, formerly Chairman, Craft Scholars' Programme, The Prince's Foundation for the Built Environment.
- William John Sim, RVM, Farm Grieve, Balmoral Estate.
- David Vyvyan Thomas, Crown Jeweller.
- David Frank Westwood, RVM, Exhibitions and Maintenance Conservator, Royal Collection.

==== Medal of the Royal Victorian Order (RVM) ====
Bar to the Royal Victorian Medal (Silver)

- Robert Rowlands, RVM, Stud Groom, Sandringham.

Royal Victorian Medal (Silver)

- Marianne Ann Back, Senior Sales Assistant, Sandringham Estate Gift Shop.
- Michael Stirling Bostock, BEM, Yeoman Sergeant, The Queen's Bodyguard of the Yeomen of the Guard.
- Kenneth George Comley, Team Leader, Property Maintenance, Crown Estate, Windsor.
- Philip Michael Hollister, Park Warden, Crown Estate, Windsor.
- Gilbert Charles Godwin Keeys, BEM, Yeoman Bed Goer, The Queen's Bodyguard of the Yeomen of the Guard.
- Constable William Paul Morris, Metropolitan Police. For services to Royalty Protection.
- Michael McNaul Muir, Ponyman, Balmoral Estate.
- Rosemary Heather Osgood, Engine Court Bookshop Manageress, Royal Collection Enterprises, Windsor Castle.
- James Daniel Pyne, Senior Warden, Jewel House, HM Tower of London.
- Anthony Kevin Rabey, Butler to The Prince of Wales and The Duchess of Cornwall.
- Constable David Martin Smith, Metropolitan Police. For services to Royalty Protection.
- Alun Bryan Spencer, Assistant to the Superintendent of the State Apartments, St. James's Palace.
- Karen Jane Woodhouse, Accounts Clerk/Farms Secretary, Sandringham Estate.

=== Order of the British Empire ===
==== Knight Grand Cross of the Order of the British Empire (GBE) ====
Civil Division

- Sir David James Scott Cooksey, lately Chair, Advent Venture Partners. For public service.

==== Dame Commander of the Order of the British Empire (DBE) ====
Civil Division

- Professor Susan Jocelyn Bell Burnell, CBE, Visiting Professor of Astrophysics, University of Oxford. For services to Science.
- Professor Marcela Contreras. Director of Diagnostics, Research and Development, National Blood Service. For services to Healthcare.
- Professor Janet Elizabeth Siarey Husband, OBE, Professor of Diagnostic Radiology and President, Royal College of Radiologists. For services to Medicine.
- Elizabeth Mary Keegan, lately Managing Director, Government Financial Management, HM Treasury.
- Barbara Mary Kelly, CBE, DL. For public service in Scotland.
- Carolyn Emma Kirkby, OBE, Classical Concert Singer. For services to Music.
- Mary Lesley Perkins, Director, Specsavers Optical Group Ltd. For services to Business and to the community in Guernsey.

==== Commander of the Order of the British Empire (CBE) ====
Military Division

Royal Navy

- Captain Clive Charles Carruthers Johnstone.
- Rear Admiral Ian Peter Gordon Tibbitt.

Army

- Brigadier Anthony William Edmund Brister (493690), late Adjutant General's Corps (Educational and Training Services Branch).
- Brigadier Iain David Cholerton (500809), late The Royal Regiment of Wales.
- Colonel David Gerard Hayes, MBE, (495624). late The Royal Gurkha Rifles.
- Colonel Gordon Shales Lane (499737), late Corps of Royal Engineers.
- Colonel (Honorary Brigadier) Hugh Charles Gregory Willing (491740), late The Royal Green Jackets.
- Brigadier John Noel Wolsey, OBE, (503973), late Adjutant General's Corps (Staff and Personnel Support Branch).

Royal Air Force

- Air Commodore Gregory Jack Bagwell, (8027917R).
- Air Commodore David John Foster (5202166J).

Civil Division

- Christiane Amanpour, Chief International Correspondent, CNN. For services to Journalism.
- Barry Andrews, Chair, Pharmaceutical Services Negotiating Committee. For services to Pharmacy.
- Professor David Armstrong, Professor of Sociology and Medicine, King's College London School of Medicine. For services to Medical Research.
- Councillor Bernard Peter Atha, OBE. For services to the Arts and to the community in Leeds.
- Joan Margaret Bailey, Deputy Director, Planning, Department for Communities and Local Government.
- Stephen Howard Banyard, Director, Business Customers, HM Revenue and Customs.
- Professor David Braham Barnett, Chair, Appraisal Committee, National Institute for Health and Clinical Excellence. For services to the NHS.
- Dr. Graham Hedley Beastall, Consultant Clinical Biochemist, Glasgow Royal Infirmary and Vice-President, Royal College of Pathologists. For services to Medicine.
- Professor Jeanne Elisabeth Bell, Professor of Neuropathology, University of Edinburgh. For services to Medicine.
- Robert Braithwaite, MBE, Chief Executive Officer, Sunseeker International. For services to Business and to Charity in Poole, Dorset.
- Audrey Caroline Brown, Deputy Director, Schools Analysis and Research Division, Department for Education and Skills.
- George McMurray Brown, lately Head, Service Management, Programme and Systems Delivery, Department for Work and Pensions.
- Richard Howard Brown, Chief Executive, Eurostar. For services to Transport.
- Myles Fredric Burnyeat, Honorary Fellow, Robinson College. For services to Scholarship.
- Leslie Paul Butterfield, Managing Partner, The Ingram Partnership. For services to the Advertising Industry.
- Councillor Leslie Thomas Byrom, Chairman, Local Government Association for the Fire Service Management Committee. For services to Local Government.
- Kay Carberry, Assistant General-Secretary, Trades Union Congress. For services to Employment Relations.
- Shami Chakrabarti, Director of Liberty. For services to Human Rights.
- John Charlton, Chair, University Hospitals Birmingham NHS Foundation Trust. For services to Healthcare.
- John Patrick Cheffins, Chief Operating Officer, Rolls-Royce. For services to Industry.
- Rear Admiral Roy Alexander George Clare, lately Director, National Maritime Museum. For services to Museums.
- Ann Clynch, Principal, Loreto Sixth Form College, Manchester. For services to Further Education.
- Godfrey Paul Cole, Director, Tribunals Training, Judicial Studies Board. For services to the Administration of Justice.
- Dr. Geoffrey Malcolm Copland, Vice-Chancellor, University of Westminster. For services to Higher Education.
- Jeremy Corbett, Head of Interventions, Dyfed-Powys Probation Area. For services to the Criminal Justice System.
- Dr. Heather Couper, Millennium Commissioner. For services to Science.
- Mary Winifred Coussey, Chair, Advisory Board for Naturalisation and Integration and lately Immigration and Nationality Directorate Race Monitor. For services to Community Relations.
- Jane Denton, Director, Multiple Births Foundation. For services to Healthcare.
- Dane Jonathan Douetil, Group Chief Executive Officer, Brit Insurance Holdings plc. For services to Business.
- Athelstan Joseph Michael Eavis, Founder and Organiser, Glastonbury Festival. For services to Music.
- Felicity Mary Everiss (Mrs. Brown), Regional Director, Government Office for Yorkshire and the Humber, Department for Communities and Local Government.
- Dr. Pamela Wilson Ewan, Consultant, Allergy and Clinical Immunology, Addenbrooke's Hospital NHS Foundation Trust. For services to Healthcare.
- Audrey Margaret Findlay, lately Leader, Aberdeenshire Council. For services to Local Government.
- Richard Scott Foster, lately Chief Executive, Crown Prosecution Service.
- Charles Alastair Fraser, Chief Executive, St. Mungo's. For services to Homeless People in London.
- Andrew Wayne Hampshire Freemantle, MBE, Chief Executive, Royal National Lifeboat Institution. For services to Maritime Safety.
- Cheyenne Jo-An Garland, Founder and Owner, Garlands Call Centres. For services to Business in the North East.
- Mak Ghattaura, Managing Director, Polypack Polythene Ltd. For services to Business and to the community in the West Midlands.
- Flora Goldhill, Director, Workforce Capacity, Analysis and HR, Department of Health.
- Professor Diana Margaret Green, Vice-Chancellor, Sheffield Hallam University. For services to Higher Education.
- Lieutenant Colonel Duncan Aubrey Hillersdon Green, Director-General, Battersea Dogs & Cats Home. For services to Animal Welfare.
- William Ian Griffiths, BEM, QPM, lately Deputy Assistant Commissioner, Metropolitan Police Service. For services to the Police.
- John Charles Harris, DL, Chair, Coal Authority. For services to Industry.
- Winifred Anne Charlotte Harris (Lady Normington), Director, Joint International Unit, Department for Work and Pensions.
- Professor Dieter Helm. For services to Energy Policy.
- Stewart Houston. For services to Agriculture.
- Dr. John Barry Humphries, AO, Actor and Writer. For services to Entertainment.
- Betty Jackson, MBE, Design Director, Betty Jackson Ltd. For services to the Fashion Industry.
- Dr. Francis Alan Jackson, OBE, Organist Emeritus, York Minster. For services to Music.
- William Mark Jessett, Senior Civil Servant, Ministry of Defence.
- Dr. Christopher David Vaughan Jones, General Medical Practitioner and Chair, Rhondda Cynon Taf Local Health Board. For services to Healthcare.
- Clive William Jones, Chair, Skillset and lately Chief Executive, ITV News Group. For services to Broadcasting.
- Gerard Joseph Keenan, lately Chief Executive, Social Security Agency, Department for Social Development, Northern Ireland Executive.
- Professor Helen Elaine Kempson, Professor, Personal Finance and Social Policy Research; Director, Personal Finance Research Centre, University of Bristol. For services to the Financial Services Industry.
- David Edwin Kershaw, Executive Principal, New College Leicester. For services to Education.
- Bernard Anthony Knight, lately Chief Executive, Bolton Metropolitan Borough Council. For services to Local Government.
- Professor Mayur Keshavji Lakhani, Chair, Royal College of General Practitioners. For services to Medicine.
- Paul John Lester, Chief Executive, VT Group. For services to the Defence Industry.
- Professor Georgina Mary Mace, OBE, Lately Director of Science, Institute of Zoology, London. For services to Environmental Science.
- Hugh Robertson Mackintosh, OBE, lately Director, Barnardo's Scotland. For services to Children and Families.
- Stella Gordon Manzie, OBE, Chief Executive, Coventry City Council. For services to Local Government.
- Clare Lucy Marx, Consultant Orthopaedic Surgeon, Ipswich Hospital NHS Trust. For services to Medicine.
- John Alistair Philip McGlone, Deputy Director, Legal Services, Department for Environment, Food and Rural Affairs.
- Thomas McGrath, OBE, JP, Chair, Northern Ireland Tourist Board. For services to the Tourist Industry.
- Edmund McKeegan, Director, Large Processing Office, HM Revenue and Customs.
- Walter Hugh Merricks, Chief Ombudsman, Financial Ombudsman Service. For services to the Financial Services Industry.
- Councillor Keith Ronald Mitchell, Leader, Oxfordshire County Council. For services to Local Government.
- Professor Richard Graham Michael Morris, Professor of Neuroscience, University of Edinburgh. For services to Science.
- Professor Mervyn Arthur Murch, Professor of Law, Cardiff Law School. For services to the Family Justice System.
- Carol Nicholls, Headteacher, Norbury Manor Business and Enterprise College for Girls, Croydon, London. For services to Education.
- Robert Niven, Chief Executive, Disability Rights Commission. For services to Disabled People.
- Anthony Patrick Michael O'Connor, Government's Chief Operational Researcher, Prime Minister's Delivery Unit, Cabinet Office.
- Alison Gail Odell, Life Vice-President, British Universities Sports Association. For services to Sport.
- Horace Ové, Director, Producer, Photographer and Writer. For services to the Film Industry.
- Dr. John Simon Patterson, Executive Director for Development, AstraZeneca. For services to the Pharmaceutical Industry.
- Timothy Dewe Phillips, Chair, All England Lawn Tennis and Croquet Club. For services to Sport.
- Stephen Poliakoff, Writer and Director. For services to Drama.
- David Andrew Pretty, lately Chief Executive, Barratt Developments plc. For services to the House Building Industry.
- Roger George Putnam, lately Chair, Ford of Britain and President, Society of Motor Manufacturers. For services to the Automotive Industry.
- William George Robertson, DL, Executive Chair, Robertson Group. For services to the Construction Industry in Scotland.
- Professor Eric Edwin Sampson, lately Head, Transport Technology and Standards Division, Department for Transport.
- Drusilla Hope Sharpling, Chief Crown Prosecutor, London Area, Crown Prosecution Service.
- Dr. Rashmita Shukla, Regional Director, Public Health, Department of Health.
- Dr. David Starkey, Historian and Broadcaster. For services to History.
- Professor Azim Surani, Marshall-Walton Professor of Physiology and Reproduction, University of Cambridge. For services to Biology.
- David Wilson Taylor, Chair, Elevate East Lancashire. For services to Urban Regeneration.
- John Joseph Thornton, lately Corporate Financial Controller and Head of Accountancy Profession, Ministry of Defence.
- Jeffrey Kamaruddeen Threlfall, Headteacher, Wildern School, Southampton and Executive Headteacher, John Hunt of Everest Community School, Basingstoke, Hampshire. For services to Education.
- Jane Emily Tomlinson, MBE. For charitable services.
- Rose Tremain, Author. For services to Literature.
- Derek Milton Twine, Chief Executive Officer, Scout Association. For services to Young People.
- Dr. Roger Urwin, lately Group Chief Executive, National Grid plc. For services to the Energy Industry.
- John David Vine, QPM, Chief Constable, Tayside Police. For services to the Police.
- Professor Stanley William Wells, Shakespeare Scholar and Chairman, Shakespeare Birthplace Trust. For services to Literature.
- Dr. Jane Wilde, Director, Institute of Public Health in Ireland. For services to Public Health in Northern Ireland.
- Judy Ling Wong, OBE, Director, Black Environment Network. For services to Heritage.
- Timothy Henry Workman, Senior District Judge. For services to the Administration of Justice.
- Tom Charles Kendal Knox Wright, Chief Executive, VisitBritain. For services to the Tourist Industry.
- David Ernest Young, Chair, Higher Education Funding Council for England. For services to Education.
- Raymond Kennedy Young, OBE, Chair, Architecture and Design Scotland. For services to Architecture.

Diplomatic Service and Overseas List

- Professor Dr. Alexander Marian Bradshaw. For services to fusion research in Europe.
- Basil Anthony John Drinkwater. For public service, Bermuda.
- Colonel Robert Trevor Groves, Group Engineering Services Director, British Telecommunications.
- His Honour Judge Howard Andrew Clive Morrison, OBE, QC. For services to international justice.

==== Officer of the Order of the British Empire (OBE) ====
Military Division

Royal Navy

- Captain Paul Martin Bennett.
- Commodore Paul Thomas Docherty.
- Commander Roy Keith John Hill.
- Commander Patrick Michael Christopher O'Brien.
- Commodore Nelson James Elliott Reynolds, Royal Naval Reserve.
- Commander Christopher Alwyn Slocombe.
- Commander Richard Charles Thompson.

Army

- Lieutenant Colonel Christopher William Edwards, TD, (526005), Royal Corps of Signals, Territorial Army.
- Lieutenant Colonel Robert Charles John Goodin, MBE, (507444), The Royal Anglian Regiment.
- Lieutenant Colonel David John Harrison (504931), The Rifles.
- Lieutenant Colonel Derek John Hudson, MBE, (517282), Royal Regiment of Artillery.
- Lieutenant Colonel Norman Johnson (534840), The Royal Regiment of Fusiliers.
- Lieutenant Colonel David William McCreath (533244), Intelligence Corps.
- Lieutenant Colonel David Francis Minden, MBE, (537852), Royal Army Medical Corps.
- 24520588 Warrant Officer Class 1 William Daren Gilduff Mott, Welsh Guards.
- Lieutenant Colonel Timothy Patrick Robinson (536509), 9th/12th Royal Lancers.
- Acting Colonel Anthony Wilson, TD, (460541), Army Cadet Force.
- Acting Colonel John Samuel Wilson (501869), Derbyshire Army Cadet Force.

Royal Air Force

- Group Captain Christopher Malcolm Bray (5206168F).
- Wing Commander David John Brook (5204238F).
- Wing Commander Michael Anthony Cousins (5206915Y).
- Wing Commander Andrew Robert Curtis (8028811A).
- Wing Commander Alastair James Macleod Mackay (8027916Q).
- Wing Commander Lester Edward Franklin Pearce (8026567L).
- Wing Commander Steven Peter Russell (8027652L).

Civil Division

- Captain Dale John Morton Worthington, Royal Fleet Auxiliary.
- Lynda Addison, Director, Addison & Associates. For services to Town and Country Planning.
- David Adjaye. For services to Architecture.
- Raj Kumar Aggarwal. For services to the Pharmaceutical Industry and to the Asian Community in Wales.
- Derek Alcorn, Chief Executive, Citizens Advice, Northern Ireland. For services to the community in Northern Ireland.
- Professor Jane Patricia Aldgate, Adviser on Child Welfare and Professor of Social Care, Open University. For services to Children and Families.
- Parvin Ali, Founder Director, Forum for Advocacy, Training and Information in a Multicultural Area. For services to Diversity.
- Robert Anderson, Grade B2, Ministry of Defence.
- Robert Malcolm Armour, Company Secretary and General Counsel, British Energy. For services to the Electricity Industry.
- Joseph William Ashton, Chair, Association of Former Members of Parliament. For public service.
- David Charles Henshaw Austin. For services to Horticulture.
- John Vernon Ayling, Trustee, Lord's Taverners Charity. For services to Sport.
- Ruth Elizabeth Bagley, lately Chief Executive, South Hams District Council. For services to Local Government.
- Nicholas Bailey, lately Accountancy Adviser, Financial Reporting, HM Treasury.
- Anne Jackson-Baker, lately Director, Royal College of Midwives UK Board for England. For services to Midwifery and Nursing.
- John Stephen Beanland, Senior Executive Officer and Chair, Trade Unions Side, Department of Health.
- Patricia Beanland, Headteacher, King's Norton Girls' School and Language College, Birmingham. For services to Education.
- Peter Michael Beckwith. For charitable services.
- Louise Bennett, Chief Executive, Coventry and Warwickshire Chamber of Commerce. For services to Business.
- Dr. Iain Lawson Blackwood, Learning Management System Project Manager, HM Revenue and Customs.
- Barbara Taylor Bradford, Author. For services to Literature.
- Michael Hugh Brankin, Band 2, Valuation Office Agency, HM Revenue and Customs.
- Dr. Frank Briscoe, Operations Director, UKAEA Culham Science Centre. For services to Fusion Energy Development.
- Alan James Brown, QPM, lately Assistant Commissioner, Metropolitan Police Service. For services to the Police.
- James Gerald Burns, lately Manager, Motherwell Pension Centre, The Pension Service, Department for Work and Pensions.
- Stuart Burrows, Opera Singer. For services to Music.
- Janet Butler, Divisional Director, Highways Agency, Department for Transport.
- Richard John Campbell, JP, lately Chair, Assured British Pigs, England and Wales. For services to the Pig Industry.
- Ronald Carbutt. For services to Peak Venture and to charity in South Yorkshire.
- Malcolm John Calder Glen Carlisle, Managing Director, Eschmann Holdings. For services to the Medical Devices Industry.
- Stephen Carter, Director, De Vere Hotels, Fife. For services to the Hospitality Industry in Scotland.
- Patricia Margaret Carville, lately Principal, St. Patrick's College, Dungannon. For services to Education in Northern Ireland.
- Michael Aubrey Chamberlain. For services to the Church of England.
- Dr. Robert Chilton, Board Member, National Consumer Council. For services to Consumers.
- Charles Edward Clark, QPM, lately Deputy Chief Constable, Essex Police. For services to the Police.
- John Henry Alfred Clarke. For services to the Gas Industry.
- Nicky Clarke. For services to the Hairdressing Industry.
- Richard Clement, Film and Television Writer. For services to Drama.
- Anita Cliff, Headteacher, Manor Primary School, Bilston, Wolverhampton. For services to Education.
- Nigel John Clifton, Chief Executive, Doncaster and Bassetlaw Hospitals NHS Foundation Trust. For services to the NHS.
- Paul Newman Hudson Clokie, Leader, Ashford Borough Council. For services to Local Government.
- John Robert Cocker (Joe Cocker), Singer. For services to Music.
- Anthony Albert Collingridge, Head, Regional Office, UK Trade and Investment, Hong Kong, Department of Trade and Industry.
- Sarah Mary Collins, Curator, British Museum. For services to Museums.
- Thomas Brendan Collins, Chair, Ulster Orchestra. For services to Music in Northern Ireland.
- Patrick Conway, Director, Culture and Leisure, Durham County Council. For services to Libraries.
- Jonathan Cooper, Barrister. For services to Human Rights.
- Dr. William Andrew Coward, lately Head, Stable Isotopes Research, Medical Research Council, Human Nutrition Research, Cambridge. For services to Nutritional Science.
- John Rawcliffe Airey Crabtree, DL. For services to SENSE (Deaf Blind Charity).
- Professor Robert Cairns Craig, Glucksman Professor of Irish and Scottish Studies, University of Aberdeen. For services to Literature and to Education.
- Dr. David Crook, lately Senior Archivist, National Archives.
- Colonel Ronald Dadswell, Chairman, The Association of Sea Training Organisations. For services to Sail Training.
- Audrey Damazer, Justices' Clerk, Ministry of Justice.
- Professor Adrian Charles Davis, Director, NHS Newborn Hearing Screening Programme and Medical Research Council Hearing and Communication Group. For services to Healthcare.
- Dr. Dermott Davison, General Medical Practitioner, Meadowbridge Surgery, Whitehead and Lead General Practitioner, Northern Ireland Cancer Network. For services to Healthcare.
- Barry Stuart Day, Headteacher, Greenwood Dale School, Nottingham. For services to Education.
- Susan Devereux, Headteacher, Banks Road Community Primary School, Liverpool. For services to Education.
- Michael Jeremy Diaper, Project Director, Physical Education, School Sport and Club Links Strategy, Department for Culture, Media and Sport.
- Paul Doble, Buzzard Project Director, Nexen Petroleum. For services to the Oil and Gas Industries.
- Professor Robert John Donovan, lately Foundation Chair of Chemistry, University of Edinburgh, Director, Synchrotron Radiation Strategy, Science & Technology Facilities Council. For services to Science.
- James Alanach Douglas, lately General Manager, Glasgow Underground. For services to Transport.
- Dr. Stephen Dowbiggin, Principal, Capel Manor College, Enfield, Middlesex. For services to Further Education.
- Kathleen Nora Duncan. For charitable services.
- Adrian Stephen Dwyer, Counter-Terrorism Risk Adviser, British Transport Police. For services to the Police.
- Gerry Edwards, Vice-President of Operations, National Semiconductor. For services to Business in Scotland.
- David John Elliot, Principal Methodologist, Survey Methods Division, Office for National Statistics.
- Commodore Tobin David Elliott, Royal Navy (Retd.), Chief Executive, Ex-Services Mental Welfare Society (Combat Stress).
- Anne Evans, Chief Executive, Heads, Teachers and Industry. For services to Education.
- Frances Feride Evans, Senior Policy Adviser, Primary Vehicle Safety, Department for Transport.
- Kim Evans, lately Executive Director of Arts, Arts Council of England. For services to the Arts.
- James Bennett Fairbairn, Managing Director, Clyde Bergemann Ltd. For services to Business and to Disadvantaged People in Glasgow.
- Walter Ferguson, lately Director, Information Technology and Estates, Crown Office and Procurator Fiscal Service, Scottish Executive.
- Dr. Clive Douglas Field, lately Director of Scholarship and Collections, British Library. For services to Literature.
- Benjamin James Finn, Co-Founder and Director, Sibelius Software Ltd. For services to Software Technology.
- Jonathan Finn, Co-Founder and Director of Sibelius Software Ltd. For services to Software Technology.
- John Dudley Francis Fisher, Chair, Carlingford Lough Commission. For services to the Ports Industry and to Business in Northern Ireland.
- Professor Georgina Follett, Dean of Faculty, Duncan of Jordanstone College of Art and Design, University of Dundee. For services to Design and to Higher Education.
- Thomas James Galloway, Grade B2, Ministry of Defence.
- Ramesh Govindalal Gandhi, JP, DL. For services to the community in Lancashire.
- George Garlick, Chief Executive, Stockton-on-Tees Borough Council. For services to Local Government.
- Ashok Ghose, Chair, Asian People with Disabilities Alliance. For services to Disabled People.
- Ryan Joseph Giggs, Footballer. For services to Sport.
- Robert Gilby, Headteacher, Hasland Junior School, Chesterfield, Derbyshire. For services to Education.
- Linda May Glasby, Chief Executive, Humber Mental Health Teaching NHS Trust. For services to Healthcare.
- Andrew Glazzard, Grade B1, Ministry of Defence.
- Brian Leslie Godbold. For services to Fashion Design.
- Dr. Henry Irwin Gracey, Head, Countryside Management Branch, Department of Agriculture and Rural Development, Northern Ireland Executive.
- John Spencer Graham, Managing Director, ExtraCare Charitable Trust. For services to Older People.
- Jennifer Gray, Professional Adviser, Children's Safeguards Policy Unit, Child Protection Division, Department for Education and Skills.
- David Russell Green. For services to Crofting and to Local Government in the Highlands and Islands.
- David Alan Gregory, QPM, Constable, Hampshire Constabulary. For services to the Police.
- Jasminder Grewal, Headteacher, North Primary School, Southall, London. For services to Education.
- Terence Martin Griffiths. For services to Snooker.
- David John Spencer Hallmark. For services to the community in Worcester.
- Dr. Helen Florence Hammond, Consultant Paediatrician, NHS Lothian. For services to Medicine.
- Davina James-Hanman, Director, Greater London Domestic Violence Project. For services to Families.
- Euan Joseph George Harkness, Chair, Gilt Edged Market Makers Association. For services to the Financial Services Industry.
- Alex Harper, Head, Basra Office, Iraq, Department for International Development.
- Dr. Mary Harris, Director, National Grid's Young Offender Programme. For services to Disadvantaged Young People.
- Stanley Philip Harris, lately Chair of the Trustees, Community Links. For charitable services in East London.
- Joseph Ephraim Casely-Hayford, Designer. For services to the Fashion Industry.
- Craig Heaney, lately Director, Business Units, Forestry Commission.
- Christopher Heaume, Chief Executive Officer, Central London Connexions. For services to Young People.
- Penelope Julia Hemming, DL, Regional Director, Confederation of British Industry Yorkshire and the Humber. For services to Business.
- Lieutenant Colonel Peter Alexander Henderson, Director, Field and Membership Services. For services to the Royal British Legion.
- Dr. Robin Stuart Henshaw, JP, Executive Director, Groundwork Oldham and Rochdale. For services to the Environment.
- David John Hewer, TD, DL, lately Assistant Chief Investigation Officer, Maritime Branch, HM Revenue and Customs.
- Frances Sylvia Heywood, Senior Research Fellow, Bristol University. For services to Housing Services for Disabled People.
- Professor Leslie Hobson, lately Deputy Vice-Chancellor, University of Glamorgan. For services to Higher Education.
- Professor Peter Henry Holmes, Pro-Vice-Principal, University of Glasgow. For services to Veterinary Medicine and to Higher Education.
- Kathryn Elizabeth Hopkins, Chief Executive, Voice UK. For services to People with Learning Disabilities.
- Derek Russell Hunnisett, DL. For charitable services to the community in East Sussex.
- Colin Kenneth Hurd, TD, Head, Strategic Technologies, Learning Technologies Unit, Department for Education and Skills.
- Peter Hutchinson. For services to the Housing Industry.
- Sarah Catriona Jackson, Chief Executive, Working Families. For services to Quality of Life Issues.
- Patricia Catherine Jamieson (Mrs. Wanning), Director, Raw Sugar Supplies and EU Affairs, Tate & Lyle Sugars Europe. For services to Industry.
- Jane Ninot Jason, Founder, Dementia Relief Trust. For charitable services.
- Barry Charles Jenkins, Chair, Cinema Exhibitors' Association Ltd. For services to the Film Industry.
- Angela Jones, DL, Chair, Royal Liverpool Children's Hospital NHS Trust. For services to Healthcare.
- Peter Jones, Director, Development and External Affairs, Biffa. For services to the Environment.
- Dr. Philip Antony Jones, President and Chief Operating Officer, CE Electric UK. For services to the Electricity Industry.
- Professor Rita Jordan, Head, Autism Studies, University of Birmingham. For services to Special Needs Education.
- Stanley George Sidney Judd, Vice-Chair, Railway Children Charity. For services to Children and Young People.
- John Kay, Head, Finance Intelligence, HM Revenue and Customs.
- Desmond Patrick Kelly, Director, National Care Forum. For services to Social Care.
- Gerald Edward Kelly, Chief Executive, North and West Housing Limited. For services to Social Housing in Northern Ireland.
- Tom Kelly, lately Chief Executive, Association of Scotland's Colleges. For services to Further Education in Scotland.
- Professor Martin John Kendall, Emeritus Professor of Clinical Pharmacology, University of Birmingham. For services to Healthcare.
- Jeanette Margaret Kennedy, Theatre Sister, Edinburgh Royal Infirmary. For services to Nursing.
- Professor Daniel Yameen Prakash Khan, Chief Executive and Principal, Grimsby Institute of Further and Higher Education. For services to Further Education.
- Professor Anthony John Killick. For services to Economic Development in Africa.
- Professor Rodney Michael Kimber, Director of Science and Engineering, Transport Research Foundation. For services to Road Transport.
- Councillor Malcolm Christopher King, Manager, The Venture. For services to Young People in Caia Park, Wrexham.
- Stewart Hayes Kinsman, lately Chief Executive, Hanover (Scotland) Housing Association Ltd. For services to Social Housing.
- Ian La Frenais, Film and Television Writer. For services to Drama.
- Karen Olivia Latimer, Architectural Librarian. For services to Heritage in Northern Ireland.
- Dr. Alastair Lavery, Chair, Sustainable Development Education Liaison Group. For services to Education in Scotland and to Arachnology.
- Anthony Lawton, Chief Executive, Centrepoint. For services to Young People.
- Dr. Paul Litchfield, Chief Medical Officer, BT Group plc. For services to Occupational Medicine.
- Timothy David Llewellyn, lately Director, The Henry Moore Foundation. For services to Art.
- Captain Robert Hugh Lowry, DL, Vice Lord Lieutenant for County Tyrone. For services to the community in Northern Ireland.
- Professor James Michael Lynch, Programme Co-ordinator, Biological Resource Management, Organisation for Economic Co-operation and Development.
- Dr. James Alexander Culpin MacKeith. For services to the Criminal Justice System.
- David Leonard Mander, Director and Chair, Archives for London Ltd. For services to Local Government.
- Denise Marshall, Chief Executive, Poppy Project. For services to Disadvantaged Women.
- Professor Nigel Mason, Professor of Physics, Open University. For services to Science.
- Professor Peter John Matthews. For services to the Water Industry and to the Environment.
- Eleanor Catherine McAllister. For services to Architecture.
- Patrick McCafferty. For services to the community in Central Scotland.
- Fergus William McCann, lately Principal, Good Shepherd Centre. For services to Residential Care and to Education in Bishopton, Renfrewshire.
- Professor John McClure, lately Chair, British Red Cross Society. For services to Vulnerable People.
- Neil Stewart McCulloch, Chair, Crimestoppers Scotland. For services to the Criminal Justice System.
- William Grant Manford McKinlay, Governor-in-Charge, HM Prison Barlinnie, Glasgow, Scottish Prison Service.
- Professor John Richard Browne McMinn, Principal, Stranmillis University College, Belfast. For services to Higher Education in Northern Ireland.
- Judith Mary Mellor. For charitable services in London and services to the Arts in Northampton.
- Fields Wicker-Miurin. For services to International Business.
- Raymond Nigel Morgan, Chief Executive, Woking Borough Council. For services to Local Government.
- Geoffrey Charles Morris, lately Chair, Association of British Healthcare Industries. For services to the Medical Devices Industry.
- Dr. Madeline Moulden, lately Senior Manager, North West Area Office, Her Majesty's Prison Service.
- Joyce Helen Mudie, Headteacher, Pilrig Park School, Edinburgh. For services to Special Needs Education.
- Adam Muggoch, lately Deputy Chair, Scotbeef Limited. For services to the Meat Industry.
- Carmen Esme Munroe, Actress and Director. For services to Drama.
- Robert David Munton. For services to Business.
- Patrick Joseph Michael Murphy, Executive, Invest NI Trade Division, Department of Enterprise, Trade and Investment, Northern Ireland Executive.
- Anthony John Newman, Head, European Unit, Foundation for the Built Environment Management, Building Research Establishment Trust. For services to the Construction Industry.
- Mee Ling Ng. For services to the Chinese community in the UK.
- Judith O'Kane, Headteacher, Melland High School, Manchester. For services to Special Needs Education.
- Captain Nigel John Palmer, Chair, Merchant Navy Training Board and Maritime Skills Alliance and Deputy Chair, Britannia Steam Ship Insurance Ltd. For services to the Shipping Industry.
- Christina Louise Parry, Operations Director, Managed Migration, Border and Immigration Agency, Home Office.
- Nancy Pearce, Co-Founder, Eating Disorders Association. For services to Mental Health.
- Francis Jeffrey Perren, Head of Technical Services, South East Wales, Department for Enterprise, Innovation and Networks, National Assembly for Wales.
- Heather Petch, Director, Housing Association's Charitable Trust. For services to Social Justice.
- Rosalind Anne Plowright, Opera Singer. For services to Music.
- David Richard Porter. For services to the Power Generation Industry.
- Dr. David Robert Prichard, lately Medical Director, North West Wales NHS Trust. For services to Medicine.
- Professor Srinivasan Raghunathan. For services to Aerospace Engineering Research and to Education in Northern Ireland.
- Benita Refson, Founder and Chief Executive, ThePlace2Be. For services to Children and Families.
- Kathleen Susan Reid, lately Director of Education and Cultural Services, West Lothian Council. For services to Education.
- Dennis Richards, Headteacher, St. Aidan's Church of England School, Harrogate, North Yorkshire. For services to Education.
- John Anthony Edward Relf Richards, DL. For charitable services.
- Joan Angela Saddler, Chair, Waltham Forest Primary Care NHS Trust and Co-Chair, NHS Black and Minority Ethnic Leadership Forum. For services to the NHS and to Diversity.
- Peter Sallis, Actor. For services to Drama.
- Dr. David Graham Salter, Deputy Chief Medical Officer, Welsh Assembly Government.
- Kenneth Robert Sawyers, Chief Executive, Neath Port Talbot County Borough Council. For services to Local Government in Wales.
- Helen Elizabeth Schroeder, Chair, North York Moors National Park Authority. For services to the community in North Yorkshire.
- Sheila Margaret Scott, Chief Executive, National Care Association. For services to Social Care.
- Athelston McLeod Sealey, Managing Director, Canefield Ltd., and UHURU Global Trading Ltd. For services to Business in the West Midlands.
- Peter Francis Sheridan. For public service.
- Geoffrey Arnold Shindler, President, Society of Trust and Estate Practitioners. For services to the Administration of Justice.
- James Walter Thorburn Simpson. For services to Built Heritage in Scotland.
- Dr. Rajadurai Sithamparanadarajah, JP, HM Principal Inspector, Health and Safety Executive. Department for Work and Pensions.
- Kingsley Ward Smith. For services to the community in the North East.
- Professor Martin Ferguson Smith, Emeritus Professor of Classics, University of Durham. For services to Scholarship.
- Andrew Thomas Sneden, Grade B2, Ministry of Defence.
- Sara Jayne Stanes, Director, Academy of Culinary Arts. For services to the Hospitality Industry.
- Walter Steel, External Relations Manager, Jobcentre Plus, Department for Work and Pensions.
- Michael John Stephenson, MBE, Managing Director, Helena Biosciences. For services to Business in the North East.
- Hilda Elizabeth Jane Stewart, MBE. For services to Rural Women.
- James Stewart, Chief Executive Officer, Partnerships UK plc. For public service.
- Julia Sturrock. For services to the Environment and to Sustainable Development in Scotland.
- Dr. Mark Sweeney, Managing Director, FG Wilson (Engineering) Ltd. For services to Business and Commerce in Northern Ireland.
- Sylvia Syms, Actress. For services to Drama and to Charity.
- Michael Eric Taylor, Chief Executive, National Association for Areas of Outstanding Natural Beauty. For services to the Environment.
- John Brown Taylorson, lately Corporate Director, DebRA. For services to people with Epidermolysis Bullosa.
- Dr. Anita Thomas, Consultant Physician in General and Geriatric Medicine, Plymouth Hospitals NHS Trust. For services to Medicine.
- Anthony David Thomas, Director and Chief Executive, Field Studies Council. For services to Education.
- Professor Meurig Wynn Thomas, Author. For services to Literature in Wales.
- Geoffrey Thompson, lately Chair, The Football Association. For services to Sport.
- Richard Keith Turner, Chief Executive, Freight Transport Association. For services to Transport.
- Richard Vickers, Children's Trust Manager, East Riding of Yorkshire. For services to Children and Families.
- Dr. Malcolm Wakerley, Technical Support and Research Manager, Department for Environment, Food and Rural Affairs.
- Janet Walford, Editor, Money Management. For services to Journalism and to the Financial Services Industry.
- Professor Diane Waller, Professor of Art Psychotherapy, Goldsmiths College and Life President, British Association of Art Therapists. For services to Healthcare.
- Dawn Ward, Principal, Forest of Dean College, Gloucestershire. For services to Further Education and Skills Training.
- Judith Margaret Watson, Domestic Violence Project Manager, Crown Prosecution Service.
- Richard Webster, Chair, Governing Body, Gorseinon College of Further Education. For services to Education in Wales.
- Jason Simon Wells, Grade B2, Ministry of Defence.
- Helen West, Chief Executive, Business Link York and North Yorkshire. For services to Business.
- Philip Mark Weston, Manager, Perdiswell Young People's Leisure Club, Worcestershire. For services to Young People.
- Dr. James Whiston, lately Member, Nuclear Safety Advisory Committee, Health and Safety Commission. For services to Science.
- Janet (Jan) White, Deputy to Deputy Director and Head of Profession for Government Social Researchers, Department for Communities and Local Government.
- Dr. John Paul Vincent Whittaker, Founder and Artistic Director, Music and the Deaf. For services to Music.
- Isobell Wilsdon. For services to the British Red Cross Society.
- Duncan Henry Wilson, Chief Executive, Greenwich Foundation for the Old Royal Naval College. For services to Heritage.
- Mark Wilson, District Manager, Cheshire and Warrington, Department for Work and Pensions.
- Melba Wilson, lately Chair, Wandsworth Primary Care Trust. For services to Healthcare.
- Dr. Monica Anne Winstanley, Head, External Relations Unit, Biotechnology and Biological Sciences Research Council. For services to Science.
- Jacqueline Wood, Chief Executive, British Show Jumping Association. For services to Sport.
- Kim Wrighton, Director, Countermeasure Systems Business, Ultra Electronics. For services to the Defence Industry.
- Waseem Yaqub, lately UK Manager, Islamic Relief. For charitable services.

Diplomatic Service and Overseas List

- Athan Anderson, Project Manager for Construction, British Embassy, Baghdad.
- Kenneth Keithley Banks, lately Permanent Secretary, Ministry of Infrastructure, Communications and Utilities, Anguilla.
- Caroline Frances Cook. For services to orphaned and abandoned children in Eastern Europe and Africa.
- Chadd Alphonso Fitzgerald Cumberbatch. For services to education, Montserrat.
- Dr. Marigold Curling. For services to healthcare in Iraq.
- Dr. William White Roden Elder, British Honorary Consul, San Jose, California.
- Tarquin Simon Archer Folliss, Counsellor, Foreign and Commonwealth Office.
- Matthew Keith Forbes, lately First Secretary, British High Commission, Wellington.
- David Pryor Gardner. For services to British business interests in the United States.
- Melville Richard John Guest. For services to Britain's relations with Asia.
- Andrew Livingstone Holmes. For services to British business interests in Ghana, including efforts to promote corporate social responsibility.
- Patrick David Horgan. For services to the British business community in Beijing.
- Percival Vibert Jackson, JP. For services to the preservation of Caymanian culture and history.
- Dr. Mohammad Shamim Khan. For services to earthquake victims in Pakistan.
- Dr. Emanuel Graham Lucas, Consultant psychiatrist. For services to Government.
- Dominic Meiklejohn, lately Deputy Consul-General, British Embassy Office, Basra.
- David Miller, Counsellor, Foreign and Commonwealth Office.
- Diana June Nelson, First Secretary, Foreign and Commonwealth Office.
- Simon Peter Nicholson, lately Country Representative, Children in Crisis in Afghanistan.
- Alexandra Mary Pond, Director Visa Services, British High Commission, Pakistan.
- Dr. June Madeleine Mary Rollinson, British Council Director, Bangladesh.
- Richard Collingwood-Selby. For services to education in Chile.
- Martin Sullivan. For services to British business interests in the United States.

==== Member of the Order of the British Empire (MBE) ====
Military Division

Royal Navy

- Warrant Officer 1st Class (Marine Engineering Mechanic) Martin John Allen, D160896N.
- Petty Officer Air Engineering Mechanic (Electrical) Timothy Barnicoat, D213519U.
- Warrant Officer 1st Class (Diver) Neil Andrew Brunton, D160702X.
- Lieutenant Commander David Cattroll.
- Warrant Officer 1st Class (Air Engineering Technician) Simon Andrew Hancock, D188651X.
- Major Steven John Hussey, Royal Marines.
- Petty Officer Logistics (Personnel) Colin Roger Johnson, D207784E.
- Chief Petty Officer Coxswain (SM) Iain Menzies Mackenzie, D109407B.
- Acting Lieutenant Commander Wayne James McGrath.
- Chief Petty Officer (Communication Information Systems) Sara Jayne Moseley, W137408Y.
- Captain Mark Rand, Royal Marines.
- Lieutenant Commander Christopher Edmund Maurice Saunders.
- Warrant Officer 1st Class (Communication Information Systems) Christopher John Smith, D172990T.
- Lieutenant Douglas William Wright.

Army

- Major David Allen (534555), The Royal Logistic Corps.
- 24368586 Warrant Officer Class 1 Wayne Hunter Arkley, The Rifles.
- Captain Edward Asquez (GR/0/7140), The Royal Gibraltar Regiment.
- Captain Colin James Baines (561710), The Royal Regiment of Fusiliers.
- Captain James Stuart Beattie (560029), Coldstream Guards.
- 24685479 Warrant Officer Class 2 Mark Anthony Billingham, The Parachute Regiment.
- Major Christopher Ronald Boryer (548857), The Royal Gurkha Rifles.
- Major Andrew Michael Britton (542044), The Royal Tank Regiment.
- Major Miles Edward Brown (519641), Royal Regiment of Artillery.
- 24688405 Warrant Officer Class 1 David Bunting, Army Physical Training Corps.
- Major David Roland Cockwell (531430), Corps of Royal Engineers.
- Major Darren Nicholas Corrie (538946), The Royal Logistic Corps.
- Major Nigel Bruce Cullen (547743), Royal Corps of Signals.
- Major Andrew John Wordie Davidson (538687), The Duke of Lancaster's Regiment.
- Lieutenant Colonel John Frederick Dawson (541372), Royal Regiment of Artillery.
- Major Derek Dobson (538829), The Royal Regiment of Scotland.
- Major Jason Paul Donnachie (535503), The Royal Logistic Corps.
- Major John Michael Donovan (527112), The Royal Regiment of Scotland.
- 24513736 Colour Sergeant Edward Duff, The Royal Regiment of Scotland.
- Captain Derek Norman Earl, TD, (503395), Royal Army Medical Corps, Territorial Army.
- Captain Ian Patrick Felstead (551188), The Princess of Wales's Royal Regiment, Territorial Army.
- Major Michael John Ford (511647), The Royal Logistic Corps.
- 24753905 Warrant Officer Class 1 Henry Hawthorn French, The Duke of Lancaster's Regiment.
- 24767691 Warrant Officer Class 1 Paul Warren Golding, Corps of Royal Engineers.
- Major Samuel Mervyn Gordon (546378), The Royal Logistic Corps, Territorial Army.
- 24634505 Warrant Officer Class 1 Graham James Green, Corps of Royal Electrical and Mechanical Engineers.
- Q1045004 Lance Corporal Alysia Joy Haworth, Royal Army Medical Corps.
- Captain Daniel Charles Hinxman (554300), The Worcestershire and Sherwood Forester's Regiment.
- 23982055 Staff Sergeant Gordon Hobbs, Corps of Royal Engineers, Territorial Army.
- Major Jeremy Derek Holman (537528), Corps of Royal Engineers.
- Lieutenant Colonel Nicholas Paul Humpherson (504938), The Royal Logistic Corps.
- Major Barrye Malcolm Peter Inglis (529126), Grenadier Guards.
- Major Michael Goronwy Jenkins (553965), Corps of Royal Engineers.
- 24725945 Warrant Officer Class 2 Stephen Richard Lewis John, Corps of Royal Electrical and Mechanical Engineers.
- Captain Martin Kirchel (561258), Corps of Royal Electrical and Mechanical Engineers.
- Lieutenant Colonel Crispin Alexander Lockhart (527147), The Blues and Royals.
- Captain Garry Allan McGown (554922), The Royal Regiment of Scotland.
- Major Phillip Charles Morton, TD, (544471), Royal Army Medical Corps, Territorial Army.
- Major Christopher Mark Moye (552124), Royal Corps of Signals.
- Lieutenant Colonel Michael Bryson Murdoch (532083), The Royal Irish Regiment.
- 24707220 Warrant Officer Class 1 Simon Mathew Nichols, Irish Guards.
- Major Phillip Trevor Parks (553093), Royal Regiment of Artillery.
- 24757372 Warrant Officer Class 1 Stephen Andrew Petts, Army Air Corps.
- W0473956 Warrant Officer Class 1 Michele Quaife, Adjutant General's Corps (Staff and Personnel Support Branch).
- Captain Anthony Thomas Gibbs Ravera (538379), The Royal Logistic Corps, Territorial Army.
- Lieutenant Colonel Trevor Paul Renwick (539510), Corps of Royal Engineers.
- Major Ian David Scattergood (525421), The Royal Logistic Corps.
- Acting Lieutenant Colonel Alan John Sharkey (517610), Warwickshire Army Cadet Force.
- Captain Colin Bowden Smith (557661), The Rifles.
- Major Susan Jane Castle-Smith (525925), Adjutant General's Corps (Staff and Personnel Support Branch).
- W0476917 Warrant Officer Class 1 Tracey Anne Stevens, The Royal Logistic Corps.
- 24831686 Warrant Officer Class 2 Kevin David Tharby, Royal Corps of Signals.
- Major Colin Whitworth (555684), The Royal Logistic Corps.
- Major Ralph William Wooddisse, MC, (533577), The Royal Anglian Regiment.
- Captain Leigh Patrick Woodhouse (24722724), Army Air Corps.
- W0478604 Warrant Officer Class 1 Laura Katherine York, Adjutant General's Corps (Staff and Personnel Support Branch).

Royal Air Force

- Squadron Leader David Phillip George Alldritt (8207058H), Royal Auxiliary Air Force.
- Squadron Leader Ashley Russell Bennett (5207065S).
- Flight Lieutenant Grahaeme Geoffrey Colledge (8419207R).
- Warrant Officer Anthony James Corcoran (P8111075).
- Flight Sergeant Mark Edmund Farrell (E8178875).
- Flight Sergeant Michael Charles Garrett (G8132016).
- Corporal Elizabeth-Jane Hutchinson (E8242607).
- Squadron Leader Mark Jonathan Jacklin (8300536K).
- Warrant Officer John Christopher Johnson (K8020354).
- Squadron Leader Elisabeth Susan Mary Lamonte (8032413T).
- Warrant Officer Robert Julian Lawson (Q8201701).
- Sergeant Anthony Norman Park (K8291034).
- Warrant Officer Raymond Robert Ralph (R8103511).
- Flight Lieutenant John Leonard Standish (0211087E), Royal Air Force Volunteer Reserve (Training).
- Flight Lieutenant David Elliot Stewart (5205136T).
- Wing Commander Ian William Thomson (5201984K).
- Squadron Leader Stephen Michael Robert Ward (8029749R).

Civil Division

- Alan Mungham-Addicott, Senior Executive Officer, New Asylum Model, Immigration and Nationality Directorate, Home Office.
- Vicki Adkins. For services to Breast Cancer Sufferers in Hertfordshire.
- Jacqueline Elizabeth Agnew, Manager, HomeAid West Lothian Furniture Reuse Recycling Centre. For services to Recycling in Scotland.
- Elizabeth Aiken, Chair, Parents and Professionals and Autism. For services to Autism in Northern Ireland.
- Jamil Akhtar, JP, Acting Chief Executive, Kirklees Racial Equality Council. For services to the community in Huddersfield.
- Herbert Roy Allan. For charitable services to the Lingden Davies Cancer Relief Fund, Shropshire.
- John David Allen. For services to Young People in East Devon.
- John Anthony Allport, QGM, BEM. For services to the community in Beccles, Suffolk.
- Sanjay Anand, Restaurateur and Entrepreneur. For services to the Hospitality Industry.
- Martin Torr Anderson. For services to the Motor Neurone Disease Association.
- Pamela Anderson. For charitable services in Burton-on-Trent, Staffordshire.
- Maurice Charles Andrews. For services to the community in Willersey, Gloucestershire.
- James Gerald Anketell, Deputy Principal, Roads Service, Department for Regional Development, Northern Ireland Executive.
- Dr. Robert Appleyard, Founder, Yorkshire County Cricket Club Charitable Youth Trust. For services to Sport.
- Robert James Ashby, Art Handler, Royal Academy of Arts. For services to Art.
- Michael Uzebu-Asije, Coach, Eastleigh Amateur Boxing Club. For services to Sport.
- Peter Askham, Caretaker, Halfpenny Lane School, Pontefract, West Yorkshire. For services to Education.
- Mohammed Aslam. For services to Community Relations in Walsall, West Midlands.
- Richard Tonge Backwell. For services to Dorset Expeditionary Society.
- Margaret Elizabeth Bacon. For services to the community in Church Stretton, Shropshire.
- Andrew Lancelot Bailey, Managing Director, Enterprise Data Systems Ltd. For services to Business in the West Midlands.
- David A. Bailey, Curator and Founder, Autograph–Association of Black Photographers. For services to the Visual Arts.
- Professor Mark Edward Bailey, Director, Armagh Observatory, Northern Ireland. For services to Astronomy.
- Peter Bailey, Curator, Newhaven Local and Maritime Museum. For services to Museums in East Sussex.
- Dr. Raymond Roy Bain, lately General Medical Practitioner, Langley Health Centre, Berkshire. For services to Healthcare.
- George Morris Baker. For services to West Lavington Youth Club, Wiltshire.
- Thomas Balanowski, Physics Teacher, Linlithgow Academy. For services to Education in West Lothian.
- Dr. Márcia Balisciano, Founding Director, Benjamin Franklin House. For services to Conservation.
- Philip James Barfield, Radio Broadcaster, Bradford Hospitals. For services to the Welfare of Patients.
- Charles Barnes, Grade C1, Ministry of Defence.
- Richard Barnes, Head of Upper School, Lady Manners School, Bakewell, Derbyshire. For services to Education and to Music.
- Linda Hazel Barnett. For services to Youth Justice in Somerset.
- Ralph Graham Baxter, Executive Officer, The Pension Service, Department for Work and Pensions.
- Dr. Wendy Patricia Baxter, lately Medical Director and Palliative Care Consultant, ACCORD Hospice, Paisley. For services to Medicine in the West of Scotland.
- Priscilla Baynes, Creative Director, Community Arts Northwest. For services to the Arts.
- Anne Beales, Director, Service User Involvement, Together. For services to Healthcare.
- John Gerard Beattie. For services to Entertainment and to Charity in Scotland.
- Patricia Millicent Beech, Library and Information Services Director, National Library for the Blind. For services to Visually Impaired People.
- Alan Crawford Bell. For charitable services in Northern Ireland.
- Edward Gilbert Bell, Assistant Senior Education Officer, North Eastern Education and Library Board. For services to Young People in Northern Ireland.
- James Bell, JP. For services to the community in Brent, Middlesex.
- Norma Jessica Bell, Chair, Lisburn Action Cancer Group. For charitable services in Northern Ireland.
- Elspeth Jean Benbow. For services to the community in Neston, Cheshire.
- Marjorie Bennett. For services to Women's Bowls.
- Richard Dudley John Bennett. For charitable services in Mawgan Porth, Cornwall.
- Roger Bennett, lately Director-General, Entertainment Leisure Software Publishers' Association. For services to the Computer Industry.
- Mary Benson. For services to the community in Livingston, West Lothian.
- Johanna Beumer. For services to the Welfare of Greyhounds.
- Anne Bill, Director, Forum for Action Against Substance Abuse. For services to the community in Northern Ireland.
- Vanessa Billing, lately Detective Constable, Devon and Cornwall Constabulary. For services to the Police.
- Margaret Heather Black, Councillor, Armagh City Council. For services to Local Government in Northern Ireland.
- Shelagh Blackham. For services to the community in South East London.
- Dorothy Blair. For services to the community in Kinlochleven, Argyll.
- John Blair, JP. For services to the community in Kinlochleven, Argyll.
- Martin Blissett, Director and Chair, Afro Caribbean Millennium Centre. For services to the community in Birmingham.
- Annette Bodsworth. For services to Deafblind People in Essex.
- William Frederick Bond, Founder, Battle of Britain Historical Society. For services to Heritage.
- Malcolm Alfred Booth. For services to the community in Shrewsbury, Shropshire.
- Patricia Lesley Booth. For services to People with Learning Disabilities in the East Midlands.
- Margaret Borley, Coach, Tonbridge Bobcats Youth Baseball Team. For services to Sport.
- Graham Bow. For services to the Fire and Rescue Service.
- Eleanor Bowman. For charitable services in Scotland.
- Sonia Boyce, Artist. For services to Art.
- Andrew Boyd, Deputy Chief Clerk, Laganside Courts, Northern Ireland Court Service.
- Alan Frank Bradbury, Chief Executive Officer, Droylsden Youth Centre, Manchester. For services to Young People.
- John Braden, Milkman. For services to the community in Raynes Park, South West London.
- The Reverend Canon Beaumont Lauder Brandie. For services to the Sea Cadet Corps.
- Alan Denis Brandon, Director of Corporate Planning and Support, West Midlands Fire and Rescue Service. For services to Local Government.
- John Mark Breeds. For services to Conservation in Devon.
- Ronald William Bridge, AFC. For services to the Association of British Civilian Internees Far East Region.
- Kay Garden Briggs. For services to the Neighbourhood Support Fund and to Young People.
- Janet Jennifer Brooks. For charitable services to Breast Cancer.
- Linda Brooks, JP, Senior Executive Officer, Engagement and Empowerment of Young People Team, Supporting Children and Young People Group, Department for Education and Skills.
- Alexander Orr Brown. For services to the Scottish Dairy Industry.
- Beatrice Margaret Brown. For services to the community in Newcastle upon Tyne.
- Derek Brown. For services to Young People in the North East.
- The Reverend Canon Kathleen Brown, Rector, St. Paul and St. Barnabas Church of Ireland, Belfast. For services to the community in Northern Ireland.
- Olive Brown. For services to Local Government in the Wear Valley, County Durham.
- Rita Brown, Supervising Usher, Bow County Court, Her Majesty's Courts Service, Ministry of Justice.
- Kim Margaret Buckland, Co-Founder, Liz Earle Naturally Active Skincare. For services to the Beauty Industry.
- Margaret Lumley Bullen, Chair, Hunstanton and West Norfolk Guild, Royal National Lifeboat Institution. For charitable services.
- Beryl Annie Bunce. For services to Young People and to the community in Eltham, South East London.
- Aisling Burnand, Chief Executive, BioIndustry Association. For services to Science.
- Margaret Burt, Chair, Scottish Safeguarders' Association. For services to the Children's Hearing System in Scotland.
- Denise Caffari, Yachtswoman. For services to Sailing.
- Robert Calcutt, Executive Officer, Security Unit, Home Office.
- Lynda Campbell, Youth Justice Worker, Leeds City Council. For services to Local Government.
- Rebecca Audrey Campbell. For services to the St. John Ambulance Brigade.
- Ronald Murdoch Campbell. For services to Conservation and to the community in the Isle of Mull.
- John Carpenter. For services to Disabled People in Berkshire, Cornwall, and nationally.
- Raymond Carroll. For services to Young People in Northern Ireland through The Duke of Edinburgh Award.
- Beverley Carter, Personal Assistant, Director's Office, Improvement Group, Lifelong Learning and Skills Directorate, Department for Education and Skills.
- Ian Winston Charles, Co-Founder, Leeds West Indian Carnival. For services to the community in Leeds.
- Kathleen Frances Cheetham, District Auxiliary Nurse, Community Health, Alastair Ross Health Centre, Bolton, Greater Manchester. For services to Healthcare.
- Biagio Donato Chiummo, Chair, Duffryn Community Link. For services to the community in Newport, South Wales.
- Carolyn Ingrid Christophersen. For services to Skiing.
- Marjorie Mary Clarke. For services to the community in Old Alresford, Hampshire.
- Stanfield Clarke, lately Ward Manager, Glanrhyd Hospital, Bridgend. For services to Mental Health.
- Hugh Pilcher-Clayton. For services to the Administration of Science.
- Harry Clements. For services to the community in West Yorkshire.
- Joseph Cohen. For services to the Maccabi Youth Sports Trust, Prestwich, Manchester.
- Brenda Colbeck. For services to the community in Batley, West Yorkshire.
- Bernard George Coldicott. For services to Arthritis Care, Haverfordwest, Pembrokeshire.
- Anne Susan Coleman. For services to the Coal Industry.
- Ray Collett. For services to the community in Bolton, Greater Manchester.
- Angela Theresa Adele Connell, Assistant Private Secretary, HM Revenue and Customs.
- Helena Maria Connelly, Clinical Nurse Specialist in Smoking Cessation. For services to Healthcare in Scotland.
- James Cook. For services to Youth Justice in Hackney, London.
- Robert Lloyd Coombes. For services to Older People in Islington, North London.
- Edward Joseph Cooper. For services to the community in Northern Ireland.
- Theresa Maria Gordon Cooper, Administrative Officer, Disability and Carers Directorate, Department for Work and Pensions.
- Ernest Corbett, Chair, Sandy Row Community Forum. For services to the community in South Belfast.
- Paul Corbett. For Public Service.
- Susan Marie Cornell, DL. For services to Disabled People in Essex.
- Joseph Ferdinand Corré, Co-Founder, Agent Provocateur. For services to the Fashion Industry.
- Jennifer Julia Cottrell, Clinical Nurse Specialist for Cystic Fibrosis, Liverpool. For services to Healthcare.
- Jane Couch, Boxer. For services to Sport.
- Alison Jane Theresa Cox, Founder and Chief Executive, Cardiac Risk in the Young. For services to Healthcare.
- Kenneth Cox, Chair, Shuttleworth Veterans Aeroplane Society. For services to Aviation.
- Susan Cox, Senior Lecturer, Dunstable College, Bedfordshire. For services to Further Education.
- James Coyle, Environmental Policy and Research Manager, Glasgow City Council. For services to Local Government.
- Ellen Mary Crane. For services to the community in Lakenheath, Suffolk.
- Judy Sarah Jarman Craymer, Founder and Chief Executive Officer, Littlestar Services Ltd. For services to the Music Industry.
- Bernard Stanley Crimp, Water Supply Works Superintendent, Sutton and East Surrey Water. For services to the Water Industry.
- Rosamond Mary, Lady Cullen of Whitekirk, lately Chair, Visiting Committee, HM Young Offenders' Institute Polmont. For services to the Criminal Justice System in Scotland.
- Grace Eileen Cupitt, President, History and Preservation Society. For services to Heritage in Calverton, Nottinghamshire.
- Dr. James Curran. For services to the Environment and to Sustainable Development in Scotland.
- Peter Curtis, lately Porter and Site Cleaner, Hull Royal Infirmary, Hull and East Yorkshire Hospitals NHS Trust. For services to the NHS.
- Zulekha Dala, JP. For services to the community in Lancashire.
- Santosh Dass, Team Leader, Better Regulation, Department of Health.
- Ann Averil Davies. For services to the League of Friends Movement in Wales.
- Raymond Joseph Davies. For services to Mountain Rescue in Derbyshire.
- Colin Davis, Senior Manager, Customs Relief and Warehousing, HM Revenue and Customs.
- William John Deacon. For charitable services in Cumbria.
- Mrudula Desai, Administrative Officer, Disability and Carers Service, Department for Work and Pensions.
- Vinod Desai, Chief Executive, South Asian Arts. For services to the Arts.
- Sylvia Janet Dey. For services to the Worcester and National Talking Newspapers.
- Beattie Doak, Chair, Royal Ulster Constabulary George Cross Parents' Association. For services to the Police.
- John Doneo, Foster Carer, London Borough of Camden. For services to Children and Families.
- Moira Doneo, Foster Carer, London Borough of Camden. For services to Children and Families.
- Alan Martin Donkin, County Director, Lancashire Association of Clubs for Young People. For services to Young People.
- Leo Michael Donnelly. For services to the community in Macclesfield, Cheshire.
- Bernadette Downey, Cardiac Nurse Specialist, Mater Hospital, Belfast. For services to Healthcare in Northern Ireland.
- Carol Downie, Chief Executive, Youth Scotland. For services to Young People.
- Dr. John Frederick Dracass, General Medical Practitioner, Totton, Hampshire. For services to Healthcare.
- Norma Beryl Drew, DL. For charitable services in Wales.
- Pauline Irene Drew, Chair, AKTER (Action for King's Theatre Restoration), Southsea, Hampshire. For services to Drama.
- Professor Francis Ashley Duck, lately Lead, Medical Imaging Physics, Royal United Hospital, Bath. For services to Healthcare.
- Bernadette Ann Duncan, Head of Security, City University, London. For services to Higher Education.
- Penelope Freda Dunderdale. For services to Young People in Lincolnshire.
- Anita Durban, Office Services Manager, Highways Agency, Department for Transport.
- Joan Margaret Dutton. For services to the community in Balcombe, West Sussex.
- John Dye. For services to the community in Lochaber, Argyll.
- Stephen John Earl, Conservation Officer, Great Yarmouth Borough Council. For services to Heritage and to Local Government.
- Fiona Mary Earle. For services to Street Children in Kabul, Afghanistan.
- Dr. John Vavasour Earle. For services to Street Children in Kabul, Afghanistan.
- Susan Elizabeth (Liz) Earle, Co-Founder, Liz Earle Naturally Active Skincare. For services to the Beauty Industry.
- Dr. Cathleen Mary Elliott. For services to Save the Children, Bromsgrove, Worcestershire.
- John Elliott, Grade C1, Ministry of Defence.
- Tina Doris Ellis, District Manager, Jobcentre Plus, Department for Work and Pensions.
- Susan Caroline Elson, Clerk, Solicitor's Disciplinary Tribunal. For services to the Administration of Justice.
- Ronald Graham John Emett. For services to the community in Beaminster, Dorset.
- Robert James Epton, DL. For services to the Environment.
- Edna Evans, Chair, Diabetes UK Voluntary Group, Birmingham Branch. For charitable services.
- Morgan Evans, Auctioneer. For services to Farming in North Wales.
- William Elwyn Evans, Chair, Aber Valley YMCA. For services to the community in Caerphilly, South Wales.
- Gordon David Eve. For services to the community in Essex.
- Alan Victor Fairchild. External Affairs Officer, Society of Local Council Clerks. For services to Local Government.
- Deborah Anne Faulkner, Human Resources Manager, Fire Service College, Department for Communities and Local Government.
- Janette Christine Fellows, JP. For services to the community in Wordsley, Sedgley and Wolverhampton.
- Alan Fennell, Coach, Glossop Amateur Swimming Club. For services to Sport.
- Terence David Fiddes, Manager, Market Intelligence Unit, Valuation Office Agency, HM Revenue and Customs.
- Raymond John Finlay, Warden, Gortatole Outdoor Education Centre. For services to Young People in Northern Ireland.
- Ylana First. For services to the community in Tynemouth and to the Arts in North Tyneside.
- Francis John Firth, Inspector, Merseyside Police. For services to the Police.
- Dr. Brian Henry Fisher, General Medical Practitioner, Wells Park Practice, Sydenham, London. For services to Healthcare.
- Eleanor Doreen Fisher. For services to the community in Birmingham, West Midlands.
- Leonard Geoffrey Fisher, Chair, Greets Green New Deal for Communities Partnership. For services to the community in Sandwell.
- David John Fitton. For services to Local Government and to the community in East Sussex.
- John Flitcroft, Chair of Governors, St. Joseph's Roman Catholic Primary School, Thurrock, Essex. For services to Education.
- Alexandra Samantha Fontaine, Founder, Yellow Heart Trust Charity. For services to Disadvantaged Women.
- Peter Charles Fordham. For services to Conservation in Suffolk.
- William Forsyth. For services to Highland Dancing.
- Gordon Walter Fortescue. For services to the community in Ashford, Kent.
- Margaret Foy. For services to the Trade Union Movement.
- Duncan Frame, Janitor, Larbert Village Primary School, Falkirk. For services to Education.
- Dr. Ian Rae Fraser, TD. For services to the Armed Forces.
- Jillian Mary Gamlin, Physiotherapist, Physio Direct Service, Cambridgeshire Primary Care Trust. For services to Healthcare.
- Moir Garrett. For services to the community in Milngavie, Glasgow.
- Remi Toyin George, Disability and Assessor Manager, Civil Service Selection Board, Cabinet Office.
- Thomas Gibson, lately Senior Officer, Labour Provider Team, Central Region, HM Revenue and Customs.
- David John Gillert. For services to the Sea Cadet Corps in Worksop, Nottinghamshire.
- Paul Gilmour. For services to the community in Dearham, Cumbria.
- Tommy Gilmour. For services to Boxing and to the community in Scotland.
- Richard Allynne Stanford Gimson, MC, TD, JP. For services to People with Disabilities and to the community in Sizewell, Suffolk.
- Susan Beatrice Glass, Trustee, Groundwork West London. For services to the community in West London.
- Patrick Everard Goldsworthy, Project Manager, Voluntary Initiative for Pesticides Programme. For services to the Environment.
- Thomas Goodlet, Stone Technician, Historic Scotland, Scottish Executive.
- Ravindra Pragji Govindia. For services to the community in Wandsworth, London.
- Neal Graham. For public service.
- Anne Grange. For services to the Independent Monitoring Board, HM Prison Leeds and to the community in West Yorkshire.
- Brian Maurice Greatrex. For services to Music and to the Arts in Chelmsford, Essex.
- Marilyn Jane Green. For charitable services in West Sussex.
- David Philip Griffiths, Detective Inspector, Gloucestershire Constabulary. For services to the Police.
- Elaine Griffiths. For services to Heritage in Gorton, Manchester.
- John Gulliver, Head Keeper, Forestry Commission.
- Millicent Cecily Hacking. For services to The Guide Dogs for the Blind Association in South Yorkshire.
- David Thomas Hadjicostas, President, The Fostering Network and Foster Carer, Southend-on-Sea, Essex. For services to Children and Families.
- Peter Robert David Haler, Chief Executive, Leasehold Advisory Service. For services to Leaseholders in England and Wales.
- Barbara Hall, Crossword Puzzles Editor, The Sunday Times. For services to the Newspaper Industry.
- Stanley Hall. For services to the Railway Industry.
- Dr. William Hall, lately General Medical Practitioner, Boldon, South Tyneside. For services to Healthcare.
- Julia Caroline Hands, Chief Executive and Chair, Hand Picked Hotels. For services to the Hospitality Industry.
- Raymond Carl Hansen, Chair, Tendring Community Transport. For services to the community in Essex.
- Mitsusuke Harada. For services to Karate.
- Jean Harborne, Operations Manager, Jobcentre Plus, Department for Work and Pensions.
- Katherine Edith Hardman. For services to School Sport.
- Eric Anthony Hardwick. For services to the Hastings Half Marathon.
- Edmund Charles Michael Harper. For services to the Livestock Transport Industry.
- Thomas Harper, Best Practice Manager, Pearce Group Ltd. For services to Health and Safety in the Construction Industry.
- Jeanette Harriman. For services to Adult Learning in Brixham, Devon.
- Clifford Raymond Harris, BEM, Management Accountant, Serjeant-at-Arms Department, House of Commons.
- Margaret Ellen Harrison. For services to Oxfam.
- John Christopher Harvey, Mine Manager, Combe Down Stone Mines. For services to the Mining Industry.
- Joan Haston, Deputy Headteacher, Visual Impaired Unit, Uddingston Grammar School. For services to Education in South Lanarkshire.
- David Roberts Hattersley. For services to the Construction Industry and to Charity.
- Jean Mary Hawes. For services to Hockey.
- Samuel George Henderson. For services to Youth Football in Northern Ireland.
- James David Hendry. For services to Cycling.
- Peter Edward Hewitt. For services to the community in March, Cambridgeshire.
- Gillian Heywood. For services to the community in Brockley, South East London.
- Dr. Michael Heyworth, Director, Council for British Archaeology. For services to Heritage.
- Dr. Christine Ann Hill, Head, Healthcare Governance, East Lancashire Primary Care Trust. For services to the NHS.
- William Hill, Executive Director Policy, Office of Government Commerce, HM Treasury.
- James Hillage, Director of Research, Institute for Employment Studies. For services to Skills Training.
- Neville Hinks. For services to Local Government and to the community in Woking, Surrey.
- Philip Gerald Hockey, Lifeboat Press Officer, Royal National Lifeboat Institution. For services to the community in Merseyside.
- Dennis Holdbrook, Chair, Houston Primary School Board. For services to Education in Renfrewshire.
- Anne Henry Duncan Holder, Foster Carer, East Sussex. For services to Children and Families.
- Denis John Holder, Foster Carer, East Sussex. For services to Children and Families.
- Douglas Edward Holliday, Licensing Manager, Kirklees Metropolitan Council. For services to Transport.
- Norman William Keith Holloway, Chair, Poole Cancer Treatment Trust. For charitable services in Dorset.
- Margaret Horrell, DL. For services to the community in South East Cornwall.
- Dr. Anthony John Howard, lately Director for the Infection and Communicable Disease Service, National Public Health Service Wales. For services to Healthcare.
- Leonora Howe. For services to the community in Leslie, Fife.
- Jan Howell. For services to the Young Witness Service in Greater Manchester.
- Kevin Shaun Howley, lately Teacher, Oakbank School, Keighley, West Yorkshire. For services to Education.
- Dr. Robert John Huggins, lately Science Manager, Environment Agency. For services to the Environment.
- John Denys Gwynne-Hughes, Clerk, Aberaeron Town Council. For services to the community in Aberaeron, Ceredigion.
- Raymond William Hulbert. For services to the community in Bristol.
- Dr. David Thomas Hume. For services to the community in Ballycarry and Larne, Northern Ireland.
- Andrew Brian Humphries. For services to Agriculture and to the Rural Economy in Cumbria.
- Jean Hunt. For services to People with AIDS/HIV in London.
- Christine Elizabeth Hunter, Head of Services, Occupational Health, Westminster Primary Care Trust. For services to the Healthcare of NHS and public service employees.
- Gillian Impey, Co-Founder, Westmoreland Heart and Soul Cardiac Support Society. For services to Healthcare in Cumbria.
- Gillian Irvine, Chair, Wansbeck Music Festival. For services to Music in the North East.
- Frederic William Jaeger, Policy Adviser, Civil Service Commissioners, Cabinet Office.
- Gillian James, Assistant Librarian, Aldersbrook Library. For services to Local Government in East London.
- Raymond Jarvis. For services to People with Learning Difficulties.
- Peter White Jenkins. For services to the community in Brecon, Powys.
- Janet Jerome, lately Clinical Lead, Prison Health Information, Scottish Prison Service, Scottish Executive.
- Maureen Dawne Jerram. For services to the community in Burton Latimer, Northamptonshire.
- Mary Bernice Johnson, Higher Executive Officer, The Pension Service, Department for Work and Pensions.
- Nicholas David Johnson, County Archaeologist. For services to Local Government in Cornwall.
- Stephen Graham Johnson, Prison Officer, HM Prison Hull, HM Prison Service.
- David Johnston, Principal Teacher, Modern Studies and Religious and Moral Education, Greenfaulds High School, Cumbernauld. For services to Education in Lanarkshire.
- Dr. Mark Andrew Johnston, Research Fellow in Arboriculture and Urban Forestry, Myerscough College, Preston, Lancashire. For services to the Forestry Industry.
- Gwendoline Dora Jones. For services to Elderly People and to the community in Rhayader, Powys.
- Ivan Leslie Jones. For services to Charity and to Sport in Minehead, Somerset.
- Jean Stanley Jones. For services to Choral Music in Wales.
- Professor Peter Albert Jones. For services to the Hospitality Industry.
- Richard Robert Somme Jones. For services to the Burma Star Association in Shropshire.
- June Mary Elizabeth Joyce, JP. For services to Local Government and to the community in Gateshead, Tyne and Wear.
- June Violet Jukes. For services to Conservation in Cannock Chase, Staffordshire.
- Ruth Hope Kamen, lately Director, and Sir Banister Fletcher Librarian, British Architectural Library, Royal Institute of British Architects. For services to Architecture.
- Teresa Claire Kearney, Lead Nurse, Acorns Primary Medical Service; Chair, South West Essex PCT Professional Executive Committee, Thurrock Primary Care Trust. For services to Healthcare.
- Emily Kells. For services to Marie Curie Cancer Care in County Tyrone, Northern Ireland.
- Peter Gerard Kelly. For services to the Environment Agency and to the community in Hampshire.
- William Ronald Kemp. For services to Civil Engineering and to Music in Derbyshire.
- Adrian Eugene Kerr, Chief Executive, Local Government Staff Commission. For services to Local Government in Northern Ireland.
- Norman Armstrong-Kersh. For charitable services in Greater Manchester.
- Peter Vaughan Kite. For services to The Duke of Edinburgh's Award in Spalding, Lincolnshire.
- Pauline Mary Knight, School Crossing Warden, Thrapston, Northamptonshire. For services to Education.
- Anne Laing. For services to the Voluntary Sector in the East of England.
- Susan Larkin, Manager, Redundancy Office, Birmingham, Department of Trade and Industry.
- Christopher James Laurence, QVRM, TD. For services to Animal Welfare.
- Ronald John Lawrence, Chair, Shepherd's Bush Housing Association. For services to Social Housing in London.
- Judith Adeline Le Tissier. For services to the community in Guernsey.
- Pamela Violet Elizabeth Ledingham. For services to the Women's Royal Voluntary Service in Hythe, Hampshire.
- Squadron Leader John William Lee, Royal Air Force (Retired). For services to the RAF Association.
- Martin Philip Wilton Lee. For services to the community in Sheffield, South Yorkshire.
- Teresa Kathleen Lee, lately Playgroup Manager, Sharnford Pre-School Playgroup, Sharnford, Leicestershire. For services to Early Years Education.
- Valleria Frances Lee, School Crossing Warden, Beccles, Suffolk. For services to Education.
- Christopher Alan Leech, Youth and Community Liaison Manager, Northern Rail. For services to Transport.
- Jim Leishman, Manager, Dunfermline Football Club. For services to Sport.
- Janet Leonard, Senior Executive Officer, Child Support Agency, Department for Work and Pensions.
- Eurof Lewis, JP. For services to the Administration of Justice in Bristol.
- Major Nigel John Lewis. For services to the Conservation of Birds of Prey in Wiltshire.
- Victor Jo Lewis. For services to Music and to Charity.
- George Frederick Loble, JP. For services to the Women's Cancer Detection Society, Gateshead and to the community in Newcastle upon Tyne.
- Gerald Long. For services to the Manufacturing Industry in Wales.
- Mary Lovell. For services to the community in Richmond, North Yorkshire.
- Dr. Hugh David Loxdale. For services to Entomology.
- James Ludlam, JP, Chair, West Ham and Plaistow New Deal for Communities Partnership Board. For services to the community in Newham, London.
- Roisin Lynch, General Manager, Black Box Network Services Northern Ireland. For services to Business.
- Trevor Michael Lyttleton. For services to Contact the Elderly charity.
- Vera Ethel Macaulay. For services to the community in Slimbridge, Gloucestershire.
- Alan MacDonald, lately Senior Executive Officer, Child Support Agency, Department for Work and Pensions.
- Evelyn MacDonald. For services to Nursing and to the community in Argyll.
- Rhona MacDonald, Chief Executive, Bath and North Somerset Primary Care Trust. For services to the NHS.
- Kenneth John MacLennan. For services to the community in Breasclete and Callanish, Isle of Lewis.
- Patricia Jean Maddox, lately Chief Officer, Age Concern, Shropshire, Telford and Wrekin. For services to Older People in the West Midlands.
- Yvonne Maguire, Senior Youth Worker, Patrician Youth Centre, Downpatrick. For services to Young People in Northern Ireland.
- John Ramsay Maitland. For services to Aviation.
- Christopher Dennis Major, Headteacher, Heronsbridge School, Bridgend. For services to Special Needs Education.
- Annesley John Malley. For services to Heritage in Northern Ireland.
- Ann Marks. For services to Physics.
- Ruth Selina Marks, Chair, Wales Employment Advisory Panel. For services to Welfare to Work.
- Vanora Anne Marland. For services to the RAF Benevolent Fund.
- David Marsh, JP. For services to the Welsh Scouting Movement and to Young People in Monmouthshire.
- Lynda Walton Marshall. For services to the Northern Ireland Hospice.
- William Marshall, Team Leader, Assynt Mountain Rescue Team. For services to the community in the Highlands.
- Douglas Martin, Senior Executive Officer, Country Targeting Unit, Enforcement and Removals Directorate, Home Office.
- Joseph Graham Martin. For services to the community in Northern Ireland.
- Robert Nigel Martin. For services to the community in Ayrshire.
- Warren Dean Martin. For services to the Snowdonia National Park Authority and to the community in Conwy.
- The Reverend Dr. Gary Mason, Methodist Pastor. For services to Community Relations in Northern Ireland.
- Susan Violetta Mason. For services to Leicestershire and Rutland Probation Service.
- Lynn Mathieson, lately Prison Service Manager, Staff Care and Welfare Service.
- Susan Matthews, Senior Crown Prosecutor and Higher Court Advocate, Nottingham, Crown Prosecution Service.
- Dorothy Elaine Mattli, Governor, Croyland Nursery School and Early Years Centre, Wellingborough, Northamptonshire. For services to Early Years Education.
- Arthur Maughan For services to the community in Lanchester, County Durham.
- Wendy Jean May, School Crossing Warden, Crediton, Devon. For services to Education.
- Dr. Ian Mays, Chief Executive, Renewable Energy Systems Ltd. For services to the Energy Industry.
- Sandra Eileen McAuley. For services to Macmillan Cancer Support in Northern Ireland.
- Ian McCrorie. For services to Music and to the community in Inverclyde.
- Janet McEwan. For services to the community in Wick, Caithness.
- Mary Louise McGee. For services to Young People in Northern Ireland.
- Calum McGregor. For services to the Oil and Gas Industries.
- Gordon Arthur McKenzie, Group Manager, Tayside Fire and Rescue Service. For services to Local Government.
- The Reverend William Moncur McKenzie. For services to the Victim Support Service and to the community in Scotland.
- Eileen McKillop, Senior Scientific Officer, Agri-Food and Biosciences Institute, Northern Ireland Executive.
- Dr. William John David McKinlay, lately General Medical Practitioner, Pendleside Medical Centre, Clitheroe. For services to Healthcare in East Lancashire.
- Wendy McLoughlin, JP. For services to Disabled Children in Hartlepool, Cleveland.
- Bernice Mary McNaughton, JP. For services to the community in Greenford, Middlesex.
- Lynsey Denise McVicker. For services to Hockey in Northern Ireland.
- Montagu Meth. For services to the community in Bethnal Green and Enfield, London.
- Kenneth Middleton, Master Armourer, Firmin & Sons. For services to the Armed Forces.
- Councillor Bernard Claude Miller, JP. For services to Local Government in Plymouth and to the community.
- Alan Milliken, Adult Literacy and Numeracy Adviser, North Lanarkshire Council. For services to Education.
- Ann Lydia Ming. For services to the Criminal Justice System.
- Gloria Alberta Minghella, JP, DL. For services to the community in the Isle of Wight.
- Douglas James Leslie Mobsby. For services to Local Government in the City of London and to the community in the South East.
- Sudershan Kumari Mohindra, JP. For services to Community Relations in Nottingham.
- Anne Montgomery, JP, Administrative Officer, Child Support Agency, Department for Work and Pensions.
- Cecily Christine Toyne Moore, Chairman, Hereford Hospitals NHS Trust. For services to Healthcare.
- Graham Scott Moore, General Manager, Military Aircraft, Marshall Aerospace. For services to the Defence Industry.
- William Moore, Senior Adviser, Advisory, Conciliation, and Arbitration Service, Department of Trade and Industry.
- Madge Morgan. For services to Lawn Bowls for Visually Impaired People.
- Yvonne Isabella Ethel Morison. For services to the community in Banff.
- Dennis Arthur Morris, lately Head of Openness Team, Histories, Openness and Records Unit, Cabinet Office.
- Alexandra Mary Moss, Head Dental Nurse, Department of Orthodontics, Eastman Dental Hospital, London. For services to Dentistry.
- Alexander Mulvenny, Owner, Labelgraphics Printers. For services to the Printing Industry in Scotland.
- Glen Murphy, Actor. For charitable services.
- Janet Murphy. For services to Disadvantaged People in Northumberland.
- John Salter Murray, lately Coxswain, Royal National Lifeboat Institution. For services to the community in Fife.
- Leon Albert Murray, JP, DL, For services to Community Relations in Telford, Shropshire and in the West Midlands.
- Lilian Murray. For services to the community in Castle Douglas, Dumfries and Galloway.
- Ronald Murrell. For services to Disadvantaged People in Merseyside.
- Stuart Arrowsmith Needham, Chair, Guide Bridge Theatre, Audenshaw, Tameside, Lancashire. For services to Drama.
- Violet Neil. For services to The Boys' Brigade and British Red Cross in Paisley.
- Dr. Peter Francis Nettleton, lately Head, Virological Surveillance, Moredun Research Institute. For services to Veterinary Medicine.
- Mary Newman. For services to Homeless People in Cardiff.
- Roger Nicholas. For services to the Downside School Combined Cadet Force, Radstock, Bath.
- Helen Norris, Head Teacher, Phoenix Children's Resource Centre, and Head of Pre-School Specialist Support Services, Bromley, London.
- Michael Norton, Dental Adviser and Postgraduate Dental Tutor, Hampshire Primary Care Trusts. For services to Dentistry in Hampshire.
- Thomas William Norton. For services to the community in Fleetwood, Lancashire.
- Ruth Dorothy Nye, Senior Professor of Piano, Yehudi Menuhin School, and Professor of Piano, Royal Academy and Royal College of Music. For services to Music Education.
- Drena O'Malley, Resources Manager, Deafblind Scotland. For services to People with Dual Sensory Impairment.
- Mary O'Neill. For services to the community in Dungannon, Northern Ireland.
- William Weir O'Neill. For services to the community in Northern Ireland.
- Sheena Mary O'Rourke, Project Manager, Hollybush Centre, Stoke-on-Trent. For services to Young People.
- Faith O'Sullivan, Higher Officer, Processing Team, HM Revenue and Customs.
- Christine O'Toole. For services to Bensham Grove Community Centre, Gateshead, Tyne and Wear.
- Martin Richard Oakley, Shift Manager, House of Commons.
- Janet Elizabeth Ogden, Customer Service Officer, Manchester County Court, Her Majesty's Courts Service, Ministry of Justice.
- Ann Oliver, Founder, Leicester College of Performing Arts. For services to Dance and to Drama.
- The Reverend Leslie Mark Olsberg. For services to the community in Manchester.
- Jean Ann Openshaw, Senior Audiologist, Salford Primary Care Trust. For services to Healthcare in Lancashire.
- Clifford Ord. For services to the Joe Walton Youth Club, Middlesbrough.
- John Andrews Osborne. For services to the community in Weston, Bath.
- Margaret Ottaway. For services to Local Government and to the community in Louth, Lincolnshire.
- Dr. Gwen Owen. For services to Voluntary Service Overseas in Cheltenham.
- Archibald Charles Pacey. For services to the community in Midlothian.
- Ellis David Murray Parker, Higher Catering Officer, Metropolitan Police Service. For services to the Police.
- Margaret Parker. For services to the Victim Support Scheme and to the community in Lancashire.
- Anthony Leon Parrini. For services to the community in Cumbria.
- Patricia Maureen Parris, Chair of Governors, Haresfield Primary School, Gloucestershire. For services to Education.
- Pamela Parsons, Sister, Labour Ward and Bereavement Counselling Midwife, The Princess Royal Hospital, Haywards Heath. For services to Healthcare.
- Evelyn Paterson. For services to the Church Army and to the Armed Forces in Germany.
- Frances Ann Early Paterson. For services to the Construction Industry.
- Hilary Patrick. For services to Mental Health Law in Scotland.
- Desmond John Alexander Pawson, Professional Knot Tier and Rope Maker. For services to the Rope Industry.
- Thomas Michael Pearson. For services to Cruse Bereavement Care.
- John Peberdy. For services to the Post Office.
- Glenis Pegg. For services to the community in Nottingham.
- Audrey Brenda Pegrum. For charitable services in the UK and Overseas.
- Donald Penny. For services to the community in the South East.
- Pamela Penrose, Senior Executive Assistant, Office of the Permanent Secretary, National Assembly for Wales.
- Lynn Anne Perry. For services to Youth Justice in the North West.
- William Desmond Pertwee, Actor and Writer. For charitable services.
- Dorothy Ruth Petticrew, Director, Townsend Social Outreach Centre. For services to Community Development and to Disadvantaged People in Northern Ireland.
- Pauline Pickles. For charitable services to Breast Cancer Sufferers in Bradford, West Yorkshire.
- Philip Pimlott, Divisional Director of Emergency Services, South Central Ambulance NHS Trust, Buckinghamshire. For services to the NHS.
- David Poile. For services to the community in Cambridgeshire.
- Gertrude Linda Pollock, Chair, Board of Governors, Leaney Primary School. For services to Education in Northern Ireland.
- Trevor Richard Pollock, Grade B1, Northern Ireland Prison Service.
- Henrietta Croker Poole. For services to the community in Battersea, London.
- Timothy Leo Oliver Poole, Deputy Headteacher, Sunbury Manor School, Middlesex. For services to Education.
- Carol Popplewell. For public service.
- Yvonne Powell, JP. For services to the Administration of Justice in the London Borough of Merton.
- Desmond Charles Preece, Training and Standards Development Manager, Brecon Pharmaceuticals. For services to Business and to Young People in Mid-Wales.
- Graham Price. For services to Rugby Union in Wales.
- Dr. David Leonard Prior, Director for Regional Projects, University of Liverpool. For services to Higher Education.
- Clifford Prout. For services to the Environment and to the community in Old Colwyn, North Wales.
- Patricia Maria Radice. For services to the community in Kendal, Cumbria.
- Kristian Radlinski, lately Captain, Wigan Warriors. For services to Rugby League.
- David Jonathan Ramsden, Co-Founder, Barn Owl Trust. For services to Wildlife.
- Mary Elizabeth Randell. For services to the community in Bournemouth.
- Janet Raymond. For services to Médecins Sans Frontières.
- Douglas Stanley Brewis Read. For services to Ploughing.
- Peter Arthur Redway. For services to Inland Waterways in Hampshire and Surrey.
- Serena Morag Rees, Co-Founder, Agent Provocateur. For services to the Fashion Industry.
- Kenneth Frederick Reeves, Curator, Kington Museum, Herefordshire. For services to Museums.
- Paul Gladstone Reid, Director, Rising Tide Trust. For services to Music.
- Rosemary Rice, Senior Classroom Teacher, Kentish Town Church of England Primary School, Camden, London. For services to Education.
- Gillian Adele Richards, Director, Atebion Recruitment. For services to Disadvantaged People.
- Rae Roberts. For services to People with Special Needs in Neath Port Talbot.
- Catherine Robertson, Teacher, Bankhead Primary School, Glasgow. For services to Education.
- Dr. Michael Arthur Rogers, Spinal Injuries Research Adviser, Stoke Mandeville Hospital, Buckinghamshire. For services to Disabled People.
- Frederick Edward Rolleston. For charitable services through the Paula Carr Trust, Shepway, Kent.
- Brenda Ann Ross, Personnel Administrator, Angus College. For services to Further Education.
- Susan Irvine Russam, Chair, Filor Housing Association Limited. For services to Social Housing in Northern Ireland.
- Elizabeth Iris Russell. For services to the community in Denton, Manchester.
- Kathryn Sallah, lately Executive Director for Nursing, West Midlands Strategic Health Authority. For services to Healthcare.
- Elizabeth Salter. For services to the Voluntary Sector.
- Satyanarayan Sarkar, Estates Operations Manager, Guy's and St Thomas' NHS Foundation Trust. For services to the NHS.
- Peter Saunders, Vice-Chair, Mid-Kent College Governing Body. For services to Further Education.
- Georgina Ann Scannell, JP. For services to the community in Swansea.
- Karen Linda Scipio, Chief Inspector, Hampshire Constabulary. For services to the Police.
- Margaret Scully, Scout and Housekeeper, Corpus Christi College, University of Oxford. For services to Higher Education.
- Jean Esme Seagrim. For services to the community in Pulborough, West Sussex.
- Jenny Seatherton. For services to Deaf People in the Diocese of Canterbury.
- John Joseph Semple, Deputy Principal, Business Development Directorate, Child Support Agency, Department for Social Development, Northern Ireland Executive.
- Kathleen Ruth Sexton, Member, Independent Members Board, HM Prison Hull. For public service.
- Richard Shannon. For services to the community in Ardglass and Downpatrick, Northern Ireland.
- Devi Dayal Sharma, Trustee, Dickie Bird Foundation. For services to the community in Bradford.
- Janet Shelley, Founder and Managing Director, Women Builders. For services to the Construction Industry.
- Councillor James Masih Shera, Non-Executive Director, Warwickshire Primary Care Trust. For services to the NHS and to the community in the West Midlands.
- Edward Paul Sheringham. For services to Football.
- Dr. Janet Sheriton, Head of Governor Services, Hampshire County Council. For services to Education.
- Peter Shoesmith. For services to the community in Greater Hollington, East Sussex.
- Doreen Brayne Sillman, Foster Carer, Oxfordshire. For services to Children and Families.
- Douglas John Simpson. For services to the Conservation of Red Kites and Peregrine Falcons in Yorkshire.
- Margaret Sinclair, Human Resources Manager, Identity and Passport Agency, Belfast, Home Office.
- Annie Sinnott, Owner and Manager, Old Vicarage Care Home, Dorset. For services to Social Care.
- Jaswant Sira, Nurse, Birmingham Children's Hospital NHS Trust. For services to Healthcare.
- Peter Michael Skoulding. For services to Local Government in March, Cambridgeshire and the Fenlands.
- Frances Margaret Slade, lately Chair, Ladies in Pigs. For services to the Pig Industry.
- Joan Slater, Chairman, British Ice Teachers' Association. For services to Ice Skating.
- Hilary Ann Sloan, Chair, Education Committee, Belfast Education and Library Board. For services to Education in Northern Ireland.
- Maurice Edward Sly. For services to Swimming.
- Bryan William Lester Smith, Gardener and Caretaker, Brookwood Military Cemetery. For public service.
- Colin Smith, Executive Officer, Disability and Carers Service, Department for Work and Pensions.
- John David Smith. For services to the community in Sherston, Wiltshire.
- Kathryn Smith. For services to the community in Killingworth, Newcastle upon Tyne.
- Malcolm Smith. For services to the Battle of Britain Fighter Association.
- Vernon St. Clair Smith, JP. For services to the Independent Monitoring Board, HM Prison and Young Offenders' Institution, Feltham, Middlesex.
- Councillor Ralph Snape. For services to Local Government in Chorley, Lancashire.
- Barry Snelson, Managing Director, Sellafield. For services to the Nuclear Industry.
- Darren Snow, Manager, The Crew Club, Whitehawk, Brighton. For services to Young People.
- Lorraine Snow, Centre Co-ordinator, The Crew Club, Whitehawk, Brighton. For services to Young People.
- Irene Robertson Souter. For services to Nursing in Scotland.
- Noel David Spreadbury, Chair of Governors, Bournemouth School for Girls, Dorset. For services to Education.
- Stephen David Stace, Mechanical Engineer, Highways Agency, Department for Transport.
- Michael Brian Stanley. For services to Scouting in England and Russia, and to the community in Oxford.
- Anne Steele. For services to the community in Benwell, Newcastle upon Tyne.
- Dawn Ośko Steer. For services to WaterAid Charity.
- Philip Stevens, Chief Executive, Newcastle upon Tyne New Deal for Communities Partnership. For services to Regeneration.
- Alfred Stewart. For services to the Barbara Stewart Cancer Trust (Dunfermline).
- Clasford Stirling, Manager, Broadwater Farm United Football Club. For services to Sport in North London.
- Michael Reginald Stocks, Deputy County Commissioner, Berkshire County Scout Council. For services to Young People.
- Martin Howard Stokoe, Lead Category Manager (Pharmaceuticals), NHS Purchasing and Supply Agency, Department of Health.
- Sandra Sullivan, Founder, Justice for Victims. For services to Families.
- Grace Sutherland, Health Visitor. For services to Healthcare in Perth and Kinross.
- Atholl James Swanston, Station Supervisor, Alnmouth Railway Station, Northumberland. For services to Transport.
- Lorraine Taylor. For services to Foster Care, Banff, Banffshire. For services to Children and Families.
- Nora Margaret Tebbutt, Chair, Professional Executive Committee; Head, Primary Care and Health Visitor, Sheffield Primary Care Trust. For services to Healthcare.
- David Llewelyn Thomas. Leadership Team, Horncastle Community Primary School, Lincolnshire and Head Coach/Manager, Horncastle Belles Netball Club. For services to Education and Sport.
- Eirlys Marilyn Thomas, lately Headteacher, Penrhiwfer Infants School. For services to Education in Penrhiwfer, Rhonda Cynon Taf.
- Agnes Thompson, School Catering Unit Manager, Thomas Hepburn Community School, Gateshead. For services to Education.
- Ian Thompson, Waste Service Manager, Forest Heath District Council. For services to Local Government.
- Martha Jane Thompson. For charitable services in Northern Ireland.
- Michael Wadsworth Thomson. For services to the Columbus Fellowship, Cheshire.
- Thomas Brian Thomson, lately Coxswain, Royal National Lifeboat Institution, Holyhead. For services to Maritime Safety.
- Ian Thorington, Director, 14 to 19 School Partnerships and Recruitment, Guildford College. For services to Further Education.
- Helen Thorne, Head of Secretariat, Research Councils UK. For services to the Administration of Science.
- Anthony Malcolm Tiscoe, Chairman, Board of Trustees, Central Foundation Schools of London, Islington, London. For services to Education.
- Ilse Wilhelmine Louisa Tivenan, Combined Court Manager, Her Majesty's Court Service, Ministry of Justice.
- Barrie Samuel Todd. For services to Architecture in Northern Ireland.
- Ann Tolani. For services to Youth Justice in Bristol.
- Eileen Toner, lately Grade C, Northern Ireland Prison Service.
- Linda Ann Tout, Founder and Leader, Young Searchers Charity, Kent. For services to Young People.
- Barbara Ann Towe, lately Executive Officer, The Pension Service, Department for Work and Pensions.
- Moira Christina Wilkie Trotter. For services to the Women's Royal Voluntary Service and to the community in Moray, Scotland.
- Dennis Bryan Troy. For services to communities in Africa, South America and Jersey.
- Kathryn Diana Turner. For services to the Shooting Star Hospice for Children, Hampton, West London.
- David William Francis Twigg. For services to the community in Northern Ireland.
- Donald Richard Twigg, Councillor, Haverfordwest Town Council. For services to the community in Pembrokeshire.
- Dennis Colin Mitchell Urquhart, Principal, Urquhart Consultancy and Director, Scottish Stone Liaison Group. For services to Conservation.
- Susan Caroline Usiskin, Epilepsy Counsellor, National Hospital for Neurology and Neurosurgery. For services to Healthcare.
- Lynda Vance, Chief Executive, North Down Development Organisation. For services to Business in Northern Ireland.
- Keith Vellacott, Clinical Director, Gwent Healthcare NHS Trust. For services to Medicine.
- Brenda Venn, Public Relations Officer, Social Services and Housing, London Borough of Hillingdon. For services to Local Government.
- Cyril Villiers, Chief Executive, SportsAid Yorkshire and Humberside. For services to Sport.
- Marie Agnes Vyse. For services to the community in Cliffe Woods, Kent.
- David John Walker. For services to the community in the London Borough of Southwark.
- Janet Primrose Walker. For services to the community in Smalley, Derbyshire.
- John Blair Walker, Founder, Walker Precision Engineering. For services to Business in Glasgow.
- Errollyn Wallen, Composer. For services to Music.
- Audrey Walsh, JP. For services to the community in Stockport, Cheshire.
- Robert Keith Warren. For services to the community in Chorley, Lancashire.
- Erika Watson, Executive Director, Prowess. For services to Women's Enterprise.
- John Paul Watson, Grade C1, Ministry of Defence.
- The Right Reverend Derek Anthony Webley. For services to Community Relations in Birmingham.
- Diana Ruth, The Most Noble Duchess of Wellington. For services to the community in Hampshire.
- Peter Whalley, In-Country Manager Iraq, Kellogg, Brown & Root UK. For public service.
- Kathryn Elizabeth Wheeler, Higher Executive Officer, Work Welfare and Equality Group, Department for Work and Pensions.
- Elisabeth Marianne Costley-White. For services to the community in Wells, Somerset.
- Lorna White, Grade D, Ministry of Defence.
- Neville White. For services to the community in Luton, Bedfordshire.
- Rosemarie Whitefield, lately Usher, Taunton Crown Court, Her Majesty's Court Service, Ministry of Justice.
- Brenda Wickham. For services to Public Rights of Way.
- Michael Wilkins, lately Director of Sports, University of Kent. For services to Higher Education and to Sport.
- Marjorie Agnes Wilkinson. For services to the community in Poulton-le-Fylde, Lancashire.
- Paul Willey, Street Cleansing Supervisor, York City Council. For services to Local Government.
- Annie Mary Williams. For services to the Royal British Legion in Wales.
- David Alan Williams. For services to Young People and to the community in Nottingham.
- Michael Ernest Williams, Chief Executive, Wessex Association of Chambers of Commerce. For services to Business in the South West.
- Susan Sian Williams, Manager, Community Radio and RSLs, Radio Licensing, Office of Communications. For services to Broadcasting.
- William Peter Williams, lately Chair, Canterbury Festival. For services to the Arts in Kent.
- Timothy Robert Crum Willis, DL. For services to the St. John Ambulance Brigade in North Yorkshire and Cleveland.
- James Wilson, International Student Adviser, University of Strathclyde. For services to Education.
- Roy Wilson. For services to Local Government and to the community in Selby, North Yorkshire.
- Walter Derek Wilson, Founder and President, Chalfont Wind Band. For services to Music.
- Norma Winstone, Jazz Musician and Singer. For services to Music.
- Kathleen Mary Wood, Head Teacher, Hornbill School, Brunei Garrison, Ministry of Defence.
- Peter William Wood. For services to the community in Glossop, Derbyshire.
- Sarah Catherine Woodcock. For services to Arts Heritage and to Dance.
- Peter Woods, Partnership Director, Learning and Skills Council, Hampshire. For services to Further Education.
- Clive Roderick Woodward, Higher Officer, HM Revenue and Customs.
- Judith Woolfenden. For services to Disabled People in the West Midlands.
- Stephen Wotton. For services to Animal Welfare.
- Harry Wrigglesworth. For services to Disadvantaged People in Stockton-on-Tees.
- Anthony Ronald Wright, Teacher, Trinity School, Carlisle. For services to Education.
- Christine Mary Wright. For services to the Boys' Brigade in Sheffield.
- Elaine Rita Wright, Chair, Higher Openshaw Neighbourhood Association. For services to the community in East Manchester.
- John Victor Wright. For services to the Boys' Brigade in Sheffield.
- Terence John Wyke, Senior Lecturer in History, Manchester Metropolitan University. For services to Higher Education and to Local History.
- Hui Yang. For services to the Chinese community in Northern Ireland.
- Jennifer Margaret Yeo. For services to the community in Crowhurst, East Sussex.
- Peter Charles Young. For services to the Police.
- Patricia Mary Zipfel, lately Senior Community Adviser, Neighbourhood Renewal Unit, Department for Communities and Local Government.

Diplomatic Service and Overseas List

- Matthew David Barber, lately Finance and Resources Manager, British Council, Nigeria.
- Dr. Samuel George Benaday. For services to the preservation of Gibraltar's heritage.
- Audrey Albinah Brooks. For services to the caring of the elderly in Anguilla.
- Frederic James Burton. For services to the conservation of endangered species in the Cayman Islands.
- Fiona Isabella Butters, lately Vice Consul, British Embassy Office, Basra.
- Christopher John Clark, MC. For services to the evacuation of British citizens in Lebanon in July 2006.
- Claudia Sylvene Creque. For services to education in the British Virgin Islands.
- Philip Charles Curr, Second Secretary, Foreign and Commonwealth Office.
- Jason Fudgell, Technical Works Supervisor, British Embassy, Baghdad.
- Christopher John Green. For services to the British business and social community in Oman.
- Joan Catherine Hall. For services to healthcare in Uganda.
- Dr. Julie Lyn Hall, lately Senior Medical Officer, WHO, Beijing. For services to health protection globally, especially in China.
- Camilla Hellman. For services to British/American relations.
- Richard Edward Michael Hill, lately British Honorary Consul, Winnipeg.
- Margaret Anne Catherine Hopkins. For public service and services to the community in St. Helena.
- Olwyn Keogh. For services to child victims of the Chernobyl disaster in Belarus.
- Elizabeth Jean Labaye, Vice Consul/Management Officer, British Consulate, Lyon.
- David McMullan. For voluntary services overseas.
- Peter Mole, British Honorary Consul, Malaysia.
- Cindy Parker, lately Senior Management Officer and Consul, British Embassy, Kabul.
- Christopher Charles Pittaway, Second Secretary, Foreign and Commonwealth Office.
- The Reverend John Peter Sandison Purves. For services to the community in Sri Lanka.
- Ulrika Schoen. For services to the Northern Ireland Peace Process.
- Sheila Mary Solarin. For services to education in Nigeria.
- Margaret Gillian Stommel. For services to the education of underprivileged children in Namibia.
- Roger Marshall Stringer, Second Secretary, Foreign and Commonwealth Office.
- Samuel Richard Templeman, lately Technical Works Supervisor, British Consulate-General, Basra.
- Christopher John Wells. For services to English choral music in France.
- Paul Anthony Welsh, First Secretary, Foreign and Commonwealth Office.
- John Everton Wyke. For services to the community in Montserrat.
- The Venerable Dr. Thomas Ian Young. For pastoral and community services in Qatar.

=== Royal Red Cross (RRC) ===
==== Associate of the Royal Red Cross (ARRC) ====
- Squadron Leader Susan Joy Oakley (0409468H), Princess Mary's Royal Air Force Nursing Service.

=== Queen's Police Medal (QPM) ===
England and Wales

- Susan Penelope Akers, Commander, Metropolitan Police Service.
- Stephen Bloomfield, Chief Superintendent, Metropolitan Police Service.
- Michael Bowron, Commissioner, City of London Police.
- Trevor Mark Brading, lately Chief Superintendent, West Yorkshire Police.
- Raymond Bradley, Constable, Avon and Somerset Constabulary.
- David Douglas, Detective Superintendent, Metropolitan Police Service.
- Sharon Louise Fielding, Chief Inspector, Humberside Police.
- Phillip Andrew Jacobs, lately Assistant Chief Constable, Police Information Technology Organisation.
- Huw John Jones, Her Majesty's Assistant Inspector, Her Majesty's Inspectorate of Constabulary.
- George Le Page, Chief Officer of Police, Guernsey Police.
- James Barker-McCardle, Deputy Chief Constable, Kent Police.
- Jonathan Michael Murphy, Deputy Chief Constable, Merseyside Police.
- Anthony Richard Pike, Constable, Lincolnshire Police.
- David Owen John Shergold, Sergeant, West Midlands Police.
- Christine Elizabeth Twigg, Deputy Chief Constable, Cumbria Constabulary.
- Geoffrey White, Detective Chief Superintendent, Staffordshire Police.
- Timothy Evariste White, Detective Chief Superintendent, Metropolitan Police Service.
- Gillian (Gill) Williams, Sergeant, Thames Valley Police.

Scotland

- John Maither Carnochan, Detective Chief Superintendent, Strathclyde Police.
- Ian Francis Grant Dickinson, Assistant Chief Constable, Lothian and Borders Police.

Northern Ireland

- David Boultwood, Chief Superintendent, Police Service of Northern Ireland.
- Allan Richard Jones, Sergeant, Police Service of Northern Ireland.
- Michael James Wilson, Detective Inspector, Police Service of Northern Ireland.

=== Queen's Fire Services Medal (QFSM) ===
England and Wales

- John Bonney, Chief Fire Officer, Hampshire Fire and Rescue Service.
- Ian Hayton, Executive Director, Cleveland Fire and Rescue Service.
- Clive Kemp, Chief Fire Officer, Somerset Fire and Rescue Service.
- Mazan Khuri, Assistant Chief Fire Officer, Humberside Fire and Rescue Service.

Scotland

- Forbes Catto, Deputy Chief Fire Officer, Fife Fire and Rescue Service.
- Gale Coates, Retained Watch Manager, Lothian and Borders Fire and Rescue Service.
- Andrew Michael Shuttleworth, Assistant Chief Officer, Strathclyde Fire and Rescue Service.

=== Queen's Volunteer Reserves Medal (QVRM) ===
- Commander Nigel Peter Bassett, RD, Royal Naval Reserve.
- Major Michael Bradley, TD, (528452), The Royal Logistic Corps, Territorial Army.
- Colonel Nigel Anthony Ffitch, TD, (517675), late The Royal Anglian Regiment, Territorial Army.
- 24718205 Colour Sergeant Harold Johnson, The Parachute Regiment, Territorial Army.
- Major Peter Edward Quegan (538146), The Duke of Lancaster's Regiment, Territorial Army.
- Squadron Leader Charles Granger Anderson (5206043U), Royal Auxiliary Air Force.

== Cook Islands ==
=== Order of the British Empire ===
==== Officer of the Order of the British Empire (OBE) ====
Civil Division

- Tukiongo Wright. For services in the community.

=== British Empire Medal (BEM) ===
Civil Division

- Tearoa John Tini. For public and community service.

== Barbados ==
=== Order of Saint Michael and Saint George ===
==== Knight Commander of the Order of St Michael and St George (KCMG) ====
- Dr. Frank Cuthbert Ramsey. For services to medicine.

== Grenada ==
=== Order of the British Empire ===
==== Officer of the Order of the British Empire (OBE) ====
Civil Division

- William Lord Gittens. For services to sport.

=== British Empire Medal (BEM) ===
Civil Division

- Dyer Celestine Marquez. For services to sport.
- Godwin Michael Williams. For services to agriculture.

== Papua New Guinea ==
=== Knight Bachelor ===
- Ramon Richard Thurecht, OBE. For services to commerce and the community.

=== Order of Saint Michael and Saint George ===
==== Companion of the Order of St Michael and St George (CMG) ====
- The Honourable Peter O'Neill, MP. For services to commerce, the community and as a Member of Parliament.
- Ano Pala, ISO. For service to the National Parliament and to sport.

=== Order of the British Empire ===
==== Knight Commander of the Order of the British Empire (KBE) ====
Civil Division

- Dr. Reubeh Taureka, CBE. For services to the community and to healthcare.
- James Neng Tjoeng, CBE. For services to business and the community.

==== Commander of the Order of the British Empire (CBE) ====
Civil Division

- Glen Robert Blake. For services to commerce and public policy development.
- John Tongri Hickey, MP. For services to education and to public administration.
- Isaac Brian Lupari. For distinguished public service.
- Hans Joachim Peter Reimann. For services to the community, business, sport and charity.

==== Officer of the Order of the British Empire (OBE) ====
Military Division

- Colonel Francis Wanji Agwi (86303), Papua New Guinea Defence Force.

Civil Division

- Christopher Charles Abel. For services to religion and the community.
- Dr. Mari Ernest Apana. For service to medicine, charity and the community.
- Nora Vagi Brash. For services to the arts and education.
- The Reverend Father Brian Cahill. For services to the Catholic Church and the Goilala community.
- Dr. Joseph Dogodo Igo. For services to medicine and microbiology.
- B. A. Wasantha Kumarasiri. For services to business, air transport and the community.
- Stephan Michael Mead. For services to the community and the International Education Agency.
- Paul Emmanuel Nerau. For services to business and the community.
- Hudson Alois Ramatlap. For services to the law and public administration.
- Francesca Rianna Semoso. For services to the arts and the Bougainville community.
- Ian Raymond Shepard. For services to the legal profession.
- Tin Siew Tan. For services to public administration, business and the community.
- Sydney George Yates, MBE. For services to the finance sector, the Stock Exchange and to sport.

==== Member of the Order of the British Empire (MBE) ====
Military Division

- Lieutenant Colonel Kalamendy Hayai (89041), Papua New Guinea Defence Force.
- Lieutenant Colonel Gideon H Kendino (88848), Papua New Guinea Defence Force.
- Lieutenant Commander Steven Tobessa (87149), Papua New Guinea Defence Force.

Civil Division

- Tim Bafenu. For services to provincial government in Morobe.
- Marshall Howard L. Binstock. For services to education and training.
- Joe Buleka. For services to engineering and the community.
- Siegfried Kerul Daniel. For services to the community, charities and business.
- Joseph Dorpar. For services to provincial government in Madang.
- Philip Douglas Franklin. For services to business and rural and agricultural development.
- Menei Kaleh. For services to education.
- Rim Purigea Kanea. For services to the community and to health.
- Allan Kundi. For services to the Police Force.
- James Campbell MacPherson. For services to education and to health.
- The Reverend Gomea Maleva. For services to education and the United Church.
- Alister Millar Martin. For services as Papua New Guinea's consular representative in New Zealand.
- Brian Mase Martins. For services to politics and the community.
- Gideon Oli. For services to public administration and the community.
- Kim Kwong Chun Or. For services to the Papua New Guinea Consular in Hong Kong.
- Helen Kurpati Saguar. For services to healthcare.
- Mary Gabriella Singin. For services to public administration and the Ombudsman Commission.
- Brian Andrew Stevenson. For services to commerce and the coffee industry.
- Ovia Nou Taboro. For services to local government and the Motu-Koitabu community.
- Roa Vuath. For services to education and the community.
- Sibaio Ume Wainetti. For services to the community and women's development.
- Andrew Yamanea. For public service.

=== Companion of the Imperial Service Order (ISO) ===
- Lucy Blanche-Lee Bogari. For distinguished public service.
- Joan Vanariu. For distinguished public service.

=== British Empire Medal (BEM) ===
Military Division

- 89947 Warrant Officer Richard Karou, Papua New Guinea Defence Force.
- 89859 Warrant Officer Steven Narimonda, Papua New Guinea Defence Force.
- 87213 Chief Warrant Officer Linus Numiman, Papua New Guinea Defence Force.
- 88429 Chief Warrant Officer Raphael Oa, Papua New Guinea Defence Force.
- 87917 Warrant Officer Michael Pokana, Papua New Guinea Defence Force.

Civil Division

- Venua Arava. For service to the community.
- Gabriel Muriki Banibia. For services to the Royal Papua New Guinea Constabulary.
- Dixon Daduwe. For services to the community.
- Linous Lee Dei. For public service.
- Jack Duadak. For services to the Royal Papua New Guinea Constabulary.
- Sisa Boio Ganiga. For services to the community and the United Church.
- Anna Haiai. For services to local government in Gulf Province.
- Pekoro Haropura. For services to the law and the community.
- Rebecca Kuanai Ilagi. For services to healthcare.
- Jacob Ju. For services to religion and the community.
- William Haihavahaela Keare. For services to rural healthcare.
- Bulima Keme. For services to education and the community.
- Igore Kirio. For services to the community.
- Polee Yalumya Kisyani. For services to the community.
- Darius Konaruru. For services to education.
- Hamabo Kuri. For services to the law.
- Geno Lagani. For services to the community.
- Winis Tua Lari. For services to the community and sport administration.
- Raphael Eka Laufa. For services to the community.
- Rarua Dia Loa. For services to banking and the savings and loan movement.
- Walai Mari. For services to the community.
- Abba Peter Maue. For services to the community.
- Baro Morofa. For services to the community.
- Matricia Genaia Na'aru. For services to healthcare.
- Igo Oala. For services to the community and the United Church.
- Sam Jack Onno. For services to the Royal Papua New Guinea Constabulary.
- Josepha Saurang Pokau. For services to nursing.
- Nelly Pouna. For public service.
- Joseph Nimbau Pupota. For public service.
- Noki Simbil. For services to local government.
- The Reverend Kabi Sirume. For services to religion and the Mount Hagen community.
- Celine Susapu. For services to healthcare.
- Arnold Kua Tangil. For services to the community.
- Anthony Joseph Tsora. For services to education.
- Paula Vuvu. For services to healthcare.
- David Yandi. For services to the community.

=== Queen's Police Medal (QPM) ===
- Gari L. Baki. For services to the Royal Papua New Guinea Constabulary.
- Norman Kambo. For services to the Royal Papua New Guinea Constabulary.

== Solomon Islands ==
=== Order of the British Empire ===
==== Officer of the Order of the British Empire (OBE) ====
Civil Division

- John Selwyn Saunana. For services to politics and to public administration.

==== Member of the Order of the British Empire (MBE) ====
Civil Division

- Dr. Obed Alemaena. For services to medicine.
- Isabel Beck. For services to the Church and the community.
- Sergeant Leonard Kwai. For services to the Solomon Islands Police Force.

== Tuvalu ==
=== Order of Saint Michael and Saint George ===
==== Knight Commander of the Order of St Michael and St George (KCMG) ====
- The Right Honourable Kamuta Latasi, OBE. For services to the community.

== Saint Lucia ==
=== Order of the British Empire ===
==== Commander of the Order of the British Empire (CBE) ====
Civil Division

- Kenneth Allan Patrick Monplaisir, OBE, QC. For services to the International Red Cross.

==== Officer of the Order of the British Empire (OBE) ====
Civil Division

- Claire Zenith James. For service to the public sector.
- Rick Wayne. For services to journalism.

==== Member of the Order of the British Empire (MBE) ====
Civil Division

- Simone Cox. For services to education and agriculture.
- Rupert Augustin Ellis. For services to education.
- Lucy Nicholas. For educational and community service.
- Marie Rita Eileen Paul. For services to the hospitality industry.

=== British Empire Medal (BEM) ===
Civil Division

- Catherine Rose Chalon. For services to the community.
- Teresa Hall. For her contribution to culture.
- Greta Joseph. For services to the community.
- Leton Lamontagne. For services to tourism.
- Marylene Paul. For service to the health sector.

== Belize ==
=== Order of the British Empire ===
==== Member of the Order of the British Empire (MBE) ====
Civil Division

- Zee Edgell. For services to literature and to the community.

== Antigua and Barbuda ==
=== Order of Saint Michael and Saint George ===
==== Companion of the Order of St Michael and St George (CMG) ====
- Dr. John Ashe. For diplomatic service.
