= Ume Wainetti =

Papua New Guinean women's rights leader

Ume Wainetti MBE, from Papua New Guinea (PNG), was the National Coordinator of the PNG Family and Sexual Violence Action Committee (FSVAC).

== Activities ==
Sibaio Ume Wainetti was National Coordinator of the PNG Family and Sexual Violence Action Committee (FSVAC) from 2002 to 2017. FSVAC was set up in 2000 to be the principal national body to coordinate activities to address family and sexual violence in Papua New Guinea. It is believed that the majority of women in Papua New Guinea have been beaten or raped by a partner or family member. The goal of FSVAC is to reduce the occurrence and suffering caused by physical, sexual and psychological violence within families and increasing access to support services and justice for survivors of family and sexual violence. The committee seeks to develop programmes that prevent and respond to violence against women and girls, providing healthcare, refuge and legal services, as well as counselling.

Under Wainetti's guidance, FSVAC was able to ensure the introduction of a Family Violence Law in PNG, and a new National Strategy on Gender-Based Violence was developed. In 2011, following investigations that confirmed that women had been raped by security guards at the Porgera Gold Mine in Enga Province, Wainetti, together with Dame Carol Kidu, was responsible the process of compensating survivors.

Wainetti is now a board advisor to the PNG Counselling Association. This association arose out of work carried out to support victims of sexual violence, when it was recognised that the lack of qualified counsellors was a weakness in the support being provided. The association has established a training curriculum and a one-year diploma course, as well as a national qualification framework, and quality assurance system for counsellors.

== Awards and honours ==
- Wainetti was made a Member of the Order of the British Empire in the 2007 Birthday Honours
