= Mary Keegan =

Retired accountant and civil servant

Dame Elizabeth Mary Keegan, DBE (born 1953) is a retired accountant and civil servant.

Born in 1953, she attended Brentwood County High School and Somerville College, Oxford, before working at Price Waterhouse from 1977; she was appointed their first female audit partner in 1985 and in 1994 became the firm's director of professional standards for Europe.

In 2001, she left to chair the Accounting Standards Board, serving until 2004. That year, she was appointed Head of the Government Finance Profession.

== Honours and awards ==
She was appointed a Dame Commander of the Order of the British Empire (DBE) in the 2007 Birthday Honours and stepped down in 2008. She was awarded the Institute of Chartered Accountants' Award for Outstanding Achievement in 2014, and is an honorary fellow of Somerville College, Oxford.
