= Monty Meth =

British journalist (1926–2021)

Monty Meth MBE (3 March 1926 – 14 March 2021) was a British journalist who was the industrial editor of the Daily Mail.

== Early life and military service ==
Meth was born in Bethnal Green, the youngest of three sons of a Jewish family; his mother was from Newcastle upon Tyne and his father immigrated from Austria. At the age of 14, he joined the Young Communist League following opposition to fascist marches in London. The same year, he left school and having studied photography he worked on the newsletter at a local boys' club. He became a messenger at the Photopress agency and then at Topical Press. On turning 18 in 1944, he joined the Royal Navy.

== Career ==
After the end of the Second World War, he returned to Topical Press to work as a dark room worker and then a photographer. He wrote and photographed magazine features, and won an Encyclopedia Britannica photography award. In 1954 he moved to Leeds to work as a full-time YCL organiser, while working on the side as a freelancer reporter for the Daily Worker. As part of his work for the YCL, Meth recruited a teenage Arthur Scargill, who was 17 years old at the time. It was in Leeds that he met a fellow young communist called Betty Stewart, and the pair married in 1956. Meth then returned to London, moving on to a salaried position at the Daily Worker.

He became industrial correspondent for the Daily Mail in 1965. Five years later in 1970, he won a prize as 'News Reporter of the Year' and was promoted to the position of industrial editor. In 1972 he moved to industry as head of communications at Beecham, then co-ran a private consultancy, from 1989 until his retirement in 1999.

== Post-retirement ==
In retirement, Meth lived with his wife, Betty, in Enfield, where he worked in an attic office. He took over leadership of the Enfield Over-50s Forum, developing it from 70 members to more than 6,000 members; it has been described as "a significant campaigning group to advocate the interests of seniors in his neighbourhood". He was life president of the group and wrote an associated weekly newspaper column.

Meth was included in Getting a Life: Talking to Older People, published in 2000 by Help the Aged, and his daily routine at the age of 87 was a case study in an Open University course on "Introducing Ageing".

He was appointed Member of the Order of the British Empire (MBE) in the 2007 Queen's Birthday Honours for services to the communities of Enfield and Bethnal Green.

Monty Meth died in March 2021.

== Publications ==
- Here to Stay: A Study of Good Practices in the Employment of Coloured Workers. Runnymede Trust, 1972. ISBN 978-0902397002
- Brothers to all Men? A Report on Trade Union Actions and Attitudes on Race Relations. Runnymede Trust, 1973. ISBN 978-0902397224
