= Duncan Wilson (heritage administrator) =

Chief executive of Historic England

Duncan Wilson CBE
- Employer: Historic England

Duncan Henry Wilson CBE was the chief executive of Historic England from 2015 until his retirement in 2025.

He was formerly Chief Executive of Alexandra Palace and Park and the first Director of the Somerset House Trust. He also oversaw the conversion of the Old Royal Naval College into a tourist destination.

He is a trustee of the Chatham Historic Dockyard Trust and the Greenwich Foundation for the Old Royal Naval College and has been a trustee of the Churches Conservation Trust (2008–2014), the Royal Armouries (2007–2011) and before that a community governor of Corelli College (2004–2007).

Wilson was appointed Officer of the Order of the British Empire (OBE) in the 2007 Birthday Honours and promoted to Commander of the Order of the British Empire (CBE) in the 2023 Birthday Honours, in both instances for services to heritage.
