= Rodney Brooke =

British civil servant

Sir Rodney George Brooke CBE DL is a British former civil servant. He was chairman of the General Social Care Council.

He was knighted in the 2007 Birthday Honours.
