= James Masih Shera =

Pakistani-British politician and educationalist (1946–2024)

James Masih Shera MBE (6 March 1946 – 15 January 2024) was a Pakistani-born British politician and educationist who was Mayor of Rugby.

== Personal life ==
James Masih Shera was born in a small rural village in Pakistan on 6 March 1946. He died on 15 January 2024, at the age of 77.

== Career ==
In 1988, Shera became the first Pakistani to be elected Mayor of Rugby. He was leader of the Labour Group in Rugby from 2005 to 2022. He also served as Chair Overview and Scrutiny Board, Rugby Borough Council from 2010 to 2014. In 2014, Shera made a record by getting elected as a councilor for the 10th consecutive term.

== Awards and recognition ==
- In 1992, he received the Sitara-i-Imtiaz from the President of Pakistan.
- He was appointed Member of the Order of the British Empire (MBE) in the 2007 Birthday Honours, for services to the NHS and communities in the West Midlands.
- A road has been named in Rugby as ‘James Shera Way' in recognition of his campaigns as chair of the council of fellows of Warwickshire College.
- In 2010, the University of Bedfordshire gave him an honorary doctorate of Business and Administration.
- In 2017, he was awarded "Freedom of the Borough of Rugby".
- In 2021, Forman Christian College University, Lahore, Pakistan awarded him honorary PhD in Arts & Letters.
- In March 2023, he received the Hilal-e-Quaid-i-Azam from the President of Pakistan.
