= Kathleen Margaret Brown =

Irish priest

Kathleen Margaret Brown MBE was the first woman in the Church of Ireland to be ordained to full-time ministry.

Brown was curate under Brian Courtney at St. Nicholas', Carrickfergus, and remained in the parish from 1988 until 1992 when she was instituted as rector at St. Paul's Parish Church, Belfast. During her time there, however, the parish amalgamated with the local parish of St. Barnabas in 1992 and stands today as the parish church of St. Paul and St. Barnabas, York Street.

Along with Irene Templeton, Brown was ordained by Samuel Poyntz, Bishop of Connor, on 24 June 1990. In 2000 she was made a canon of St Anne's Cathedral, Belfast.

Brown retired from full-time ministry in 2007. She is currently pastoral minister to the widows of clergy in the Diocese of Connor,

Brown received the Member of the Order of the British Empire (MBE) for services to the community in Northern Ireland in the Queen's Birthday Honours 2007. She had gained a Bachelor of Divinity (BD) and a Bachelor of Theology (BTh).
