= Leslie Butterfield =

British business consultant

Leslie Butterfield CBE
- Occupation: Brand Consultant
- Awards: Commander of the Order of the British Empire

Leslie Butterfield CBE is a British brand and communications consultant. He has held senior roles in advertising and brand strategy, including serving as Global Chief Strategy Officer at Interbrand. He has also worked with the UK Labour Party on communications strategy and has been involved in a number of consultancy ventures. In 2007, he was appointed Commander of the Order of the British Empire (CBE).

== Career ==
=== Early career ===
Butterfield began his career in advertising at the agency Boase Massimi Pollitt in 1975. In 1980, he joined Abbott Mead Vickers as Planning Director.

In 1987, he co-founded the advertising agency Butterfield Day DeVito Hockney (BDDH), where he initially served as Planning Director and later as Chairman. By 2002, BDDH was among the top 20 advertising agencies in the United Kingdom. The agency was acquired by Snyder Communications in 1998.

=== Political involvement and work ===
Butterfield began working with the UK Labour Party in the mid-1980s. He conducted qualitative research assessing public perceptions of Prime Minister Margaret Thatcher's policies and their impact on voting behaviour. This research was cited in Philip Gould’s book The Unfinished Revolution as being influential in shaping Labour’s communication strategy. Following the 1992 general election, Butterfield produced additional research recommending strategic adjustments to the party’s messaging. He continued to advise Labour on communications during the general elections of 1997, 2001, and 2005.

=== Brand consultancy ===
In 2001, Butterfield left BDDH to focus on brand and communications consultancy. He founded Butterfield8, a firm comprising himself and seven partners. The consultancy was acquired by The Ingram Partnership in 2003, where Butterfield became a partner. He later founded Butterfield Partners in 2007, operating the firm until 2008.

In 2008, Butterfield joined Interbrand as Global Chief Strategy Officer and was later appointed to the company's executive leadership team. He was based in London until 2012 and subsequently relocated to Shanghai, where he worked from 2013 to 2015. Upon returning to the UK in 2015, Butterfield co-founded a new brand consultancy, Butterfield Harris.

== Honours ==
- Appointed Commander of the Order of the British Empire (CBE) in the 2007 Birthday Honours for services to the advertising industry.
- Elected a Fellow of the Royal Society of Arts (2022-2025).

== Books ==
- Excellence in Advertising. The IPA Guide to Best Practice.; First edition 1997. Second Edition 1999; Butterworth Heinemann
- AdValue. Twenty ways Advertising works for Business.; 2003; Butterworth Heinemann
- Enduring Passion. The Story of the Mercedes-Benz Brand; 2005; Wiley'
