= Peter Sheridan (police officer) =

Charity manager and former police office, Northern Ireland

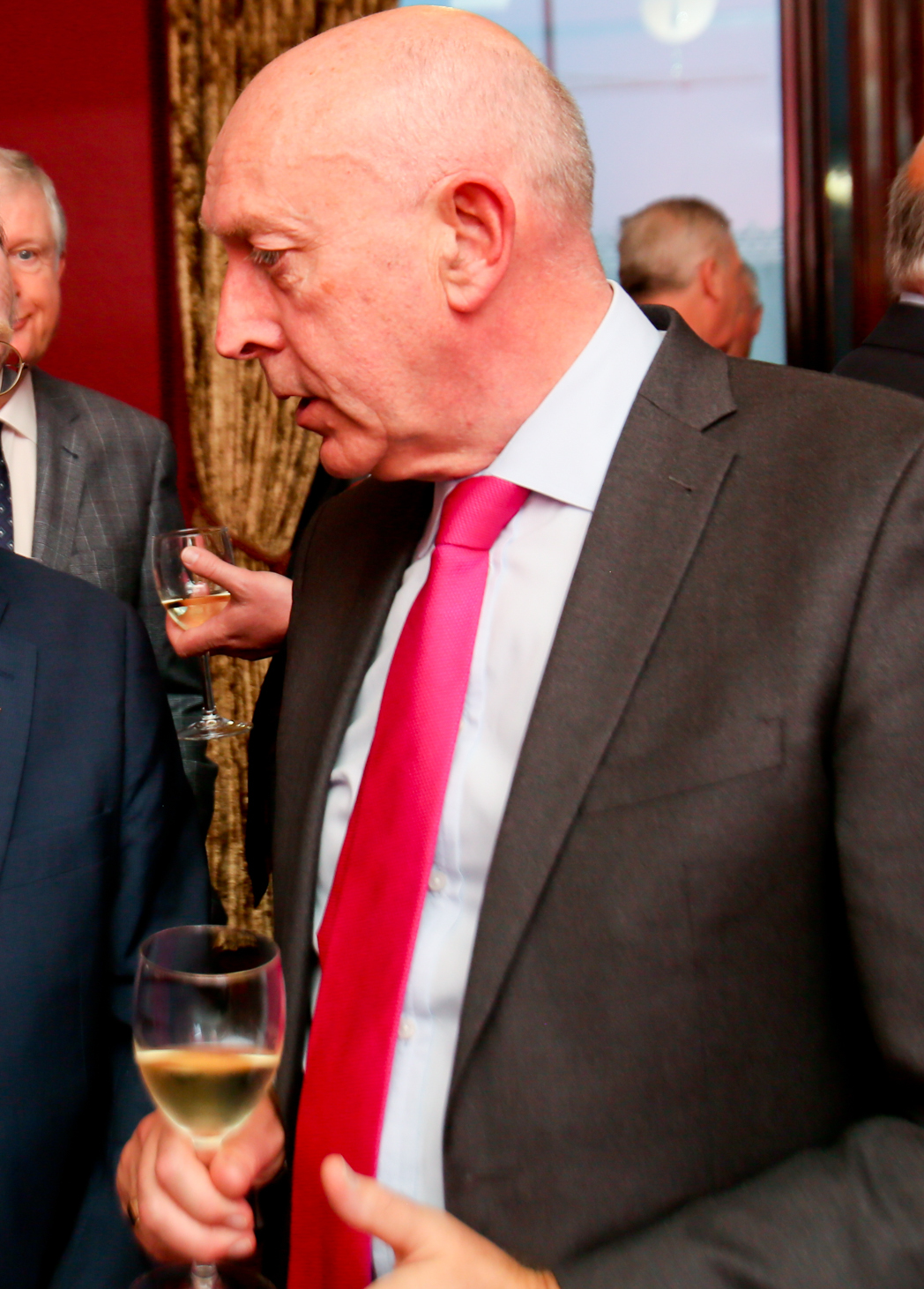

Peter Francis Sheridan CBE DL is a charity executive and former police officer in Northern Ireland. He is chief executive of Co-operation Ireland, a peace-building charity.

He was appointed Officer of the Order of the British Empire (OBE) in the 2007 Birthday Honours and Commander of the Order of the British Empire (CBE) in the 2023 Birthday Honours for services to peacebuilding.
