= Architecture and Design Scotland =

UK non-departmental public body

- Scottish Gaelic: Ailtearachd is Dealbhadh na h-Alba

Agency overview
- Formed: 2004
- Type: Executive non-departmental public body
- Jurisdiction: Scotland
- Headquarters: Edinburgh Futures Institute, 1 Lauriston Place, Edinburgh
- Agency executives: Jim MacDonald, Chief Executive; Kirsty Macari, Acting Chair
- Website: www.ads.org.uk

Architecture and Design Scotland, also styled Architecture & Design Scotland (A&DS; Scottish Gaelic: Ailtearachd is Dealbhadh na h-Alba), is an executive non-departmental public body of the Scottish Government. It was established in 2004 to provide advice to the government, and bodies involved in commissioning, designing and regulating new buildings and places.
