= Jean Hawes =

Jean Mary Hawes (16 January 1932 – 16 October 2008) received an MBE in 2007 for her services to hockey from The Queen at Buckingham Palace.

When she was 14, she joined Wycombe Rye Ladies Hockey Club, based in High Wycombe. Jean was a part of Wycombe Rye Ladies for over 60 years, serving in many different roles – as a player, an umpire, a committee member, and a friend to all.
