= Norbury High School for Girls =

Location
- Kensington Avenue; Thornton Heath, Greater London, CR7 8BT; England
- Coordinates: 51°24′40″N 0°06′55″W

Information
- Type: Academy
- Department for Education URN: 137754 Tables
- Ofsted: Reports
- Headteacher: Markieu Hayden
- Gender: girls
- Age: 11 to 19
- Enrolment: 1,165
- Website: http://www.nhsg.org.uk/

Norbury High School for Girls is a secondary school with academy status for girls aged 11–19. It is located in Thornton Heath, Greater London, England.
