= Ann Marks =

British Physics teacher and science communicator (1941 – 2016)

Ann Marks MBE CPhys FInstP
- Born: 24 July 1941
- Died: 9 October 2016 (aged 75)
- Education: University of Liverpool
- Known for: Promoting women in physics
- Spouse: Neil Marks
- Awards: IOP Phillips Award, 2013
- Scientific career
- Fields: Physics
- Institutions: University of Liverpool

Ann Marks MBE CPhys FInstP (24 July 1941 – 9 October 2016) was a British physics teacher and science communicator.

== Biography ==
Marks obtained a scholarship and studied at the University of Liverpool, receiving a BSc in physics in 1963. She also trained as a Qualified Teacher. She moved to Grenoble in 1987 to work on the European Synchrotron Radiation Facility, before returning to England a few years later. Marks was heavily involved with volunteering for the Institute of Physics (IOP) Women in Physics Committee from 1995. Marks founded the UK Young Woman Physicist Award (now the Jocelyn Bell Burnell Medal and Prize) in 2007. She was also active with the European Platform of Women Scientists (EPWS) at a similar time.

She ran very successful workshops, with the aim of attracting young girls into science. Marks was awarded Membership of the Order of the British Empire (MBE), for "services to Physics" in 2007. Marks often published articles about the status of women in Physics in the United Kingdom. Some of her publications were co-authored with Gillian Gehring.

=== Personal life ===
Marks was married to Neil Marks, with whom she shared the Phillips Award in 2013. She was also a Methodist lay preacher.

== Awards and honours ==
- Membership of the Order of the British Empire, MBE, for “services to Physics”, 2007
- Institute of Physics Phillips Award for distinguished service (jointly with Neil Marks), 2013
- University of Liverpool/Institute of Physics Ann Marks memorial lecture and prize named in her honour, started in 2017

== See also ==
- Timeline of women in science
