= NHS Purchasing and Supply Agency =

Former executive agency in the UK

The NHS Purchasing and Supply Agency was an executive agency of the Department of Health (DH) in the United Kingdom.

It was the purchasing arm of the National Health Service in England and had main offices in Chester and Reading. The Agency was self-funding in that it did not charge either suppliers or customers.

None of the Agency's contracts were mandatory, although until mid-2006 there was an increasing tendency to insist on their use; especially for NHS trusts who were in sufficient financial distress to have turn-around teams installed by the DH.

The Agency closed in April 2010 with its functions being split between the DH and other government agencies, including NHS Supply chain.
