= In Kind Direct =

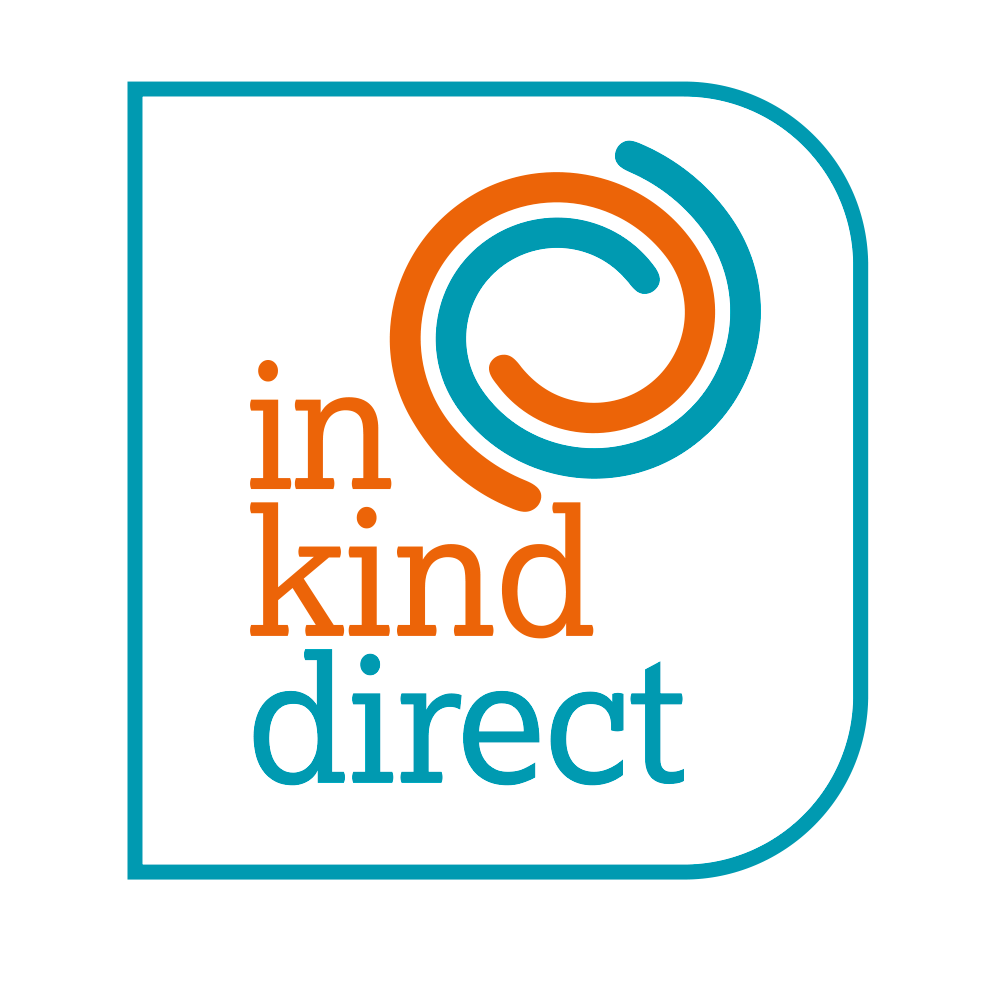
- Industry: Charity/Third Sector
- Founded: 1996
- Headquarters: City of London
- Key people: Charles III (then Prince of Wales), Founder and Patron; Rosanne Gray, CEO
- Revenue: 22,501,427 pound sterling (2016)
- Number of employees: 17 (2016, 2018)
- Website: https://www.inkinddirect.org

In Kind Direct is a charity in the United Kingdom founded in 1996 by King Charles III (the then Prince of Wales). The charity distributes new donated usable consumer goods from manufacturers and retailers to British charities working both domestically and abroad. King Charles III is In Kind Direct's Royal founding patron, and Rosanne Gray CEO since December 2019.

== Operations ==
In Kind Direct collects donated goods from companies and distributes them to charitable organisations, reducing their expenditure on essential items. They vet organisations rigorously to ensure proper use of the products and prevent resale. Charitable organisations receiving donations agree not to sell or trade the goods. In Kind Direct track donations and report the impact to their corporate partners and funders.

== International network ==
In 2013 In Kind Direct was the founding member of a new charity, In Kind Direct International (IKDI). IKDI was established to set up a network of charities from a growing number of countries, all distributing donated surplus new goods from donors to charities, not for profit organisations, associations and social enterprises. Members of the IKDI Network work together to share information about donations and to share knowledge and expertise to enable goods to be distributed to charities and their beneficiaries in the most effective way. This network consists of three members : In Kind Direct in the United Kingdom, Innatura in Germany and Dons Solidaires in France. IKDI is currently seeking to expand into Northern Europe and Asia.
