= Kim Evans =

Kim Evans OBE (born January 1951) is an arts consultant and documentary filmmaker. Evans spent ten years on The South Bank Show and Channel 4. She was head of music and arts at the BBC and then executive director arts at Arts Council England. Evans was chair of Clean Break theatre company for eight years, and a member of the Parole Board for England and Wales. Until July 2014, she was a trustee of the Heritage Lottery Fund. She was made a member of the Order of the British Empire in 2007 for Services to the Arts. She was a trustee of the National Portrait Gallery. Evans is an Honorary Fellow of the Royal College of Art and a Fellow of the Royal Television Society and Royal Society of Arts.

== Life ==
Kim Evans began her career as a print journalist, before

is an arts consultant and documentary filmmaker. Evans spent ten years on The South Bank Show and Channel 4. She was head of music and arts at the BBC and then executive director arts at Arts Council England. From 2012 to 2020, Evans was chair of Clean Break theatre company, a women's theatre company. She was a member of the Parole Board for England and Wales.

Until July 2014, Evans was a trustee of the Heritage Lottery Fund. She is a trustee of the National Portrait Gallery. Evans is on the committee of the 18 Keys charity, which runs support programmes for homeless women.

== Honours and awards ==
Evans was made a member of the Order of the British Empire in 2007 for Services to the Arts. She is an Honorary Fellow of the Royal College of Art and a Fellow of the Royal Television Society and Royal Society of Arts. Evans's film Angela Carter’s Curious Room won a BAFTA award.
