= Barn Owl Trust =

English charity for animals

The Barn Owl Trust is a charity located at Waterleat, Ashburton, Devon, England. It aims to conserve the barn owl and its environment. It was established in 1988. The Barn Owl Trust has carried out a study of the death toll caused by road accidents. Its postcode is TQ13 7HU.
