= Diane Waller =

British art therapist

Diane Waller OBE, President of the British Association of Art Therapists, the emeritus professor of Art Psychotherapy at Goldsmiths, University of London, Vice-President of the International Society for Expression and Art Therapy, a council member of the World Psychiatric Association's Section on Art and Psychiatry, a council member of the Health Professions Council, Professor Diane Waller was appointed an OBE in the June 2007 Birthday Honours list for services to healthcare.

She has written a book, Waller, Diane. Textiles from the Balkans. "The" British Museum Press, 2010
