= Derek Twine =

Derek Milton Twine
- Born: 1951 (age 74–75)
- Occupations: Charity CEO, trustee and consultant
- Known for: Chief Scout Executive of the Scout Association

Derek Milton Twine CBE FRSA (born 1951) is a British charity CEO, trustee and consultant who served as the Chief Scout Executive of the Scout Association from 1996 to 2013. He is an elected member of the Council of the Scout Association. He is an Honorary Lay Canon in the Diocese of Leeds. He was Chair of Bradford Cathedral Council 2013–2023, and since 2023 is a member of Ripon Cathedral Consultative Council. He has been vice-chair of the Church Urban Fund, and a member of Council of the National Trust. In 2020 he was appointed by the Secretary of State as a member of the Yorkshire Dales National Park Authority, and since 2024 is Chair of the Authority.

He was a volunteer adult Scout leader from 1968 to 1976, and was on the academic staff of Bangor University. At the Scout Association Headquarters he held various positions initially as a volunteer on communications and on social action programmes. He joined the national professional staff team and in 1996 was appointed as UK CEO. He also contributed widely to European and global development initiatives for youth programme, adult volunteering and organisational development. In 2012, Twine was awarded the 340th Bronze Wolf, the distinction of the World Organization of the Scout Movement, awarded by the World Scout Committee for exceptional services to World Scouting. He retired as CEO in 2013.

He was appointed a Chartered Fellow of the CIPD in 2003. He has been active in various roles with the National Youth Agency (NYA), Association of Chief Executives of Voluntary Organisations (ACEVO), the National Council of Voluntary Organisations (NCVO), the Association of Chairs (AoC), and the National Council of Voluntary Youth Services (NCVYS) being presented with their Lifetime Achievement Award in 2012.

In 2007 he was appointed as CBE by HM The Queen "for services to young people".
