= Senior Salaries Review Body =

Advisory panel to the Government of the United Kingdom

The Senior Salaries Review Body, established 1971 provides advice to the Prime Minister, Lord Chancellor and Secretary of State for Defence relating to remuneration of holders of public office.

Additionally it advises the Prime Minister on pay and pensions of Members of Parliament.

The current Chair is Lea Paterson, who was appointed on 17 October 2024.
