= Denise Marshall =

British feminist campaigner (1961–2015)

- Born: 12 December 1961
- Died: 21 August 2015 (aged 53)

Denise Marshall OBE (12 December 1961 – 21 August 2015) was a British feminist and lesbian campaigner and charity executive involved in campaigning against and helping victims of domestic violence, sex trafficking and homophobia.

She was born in Highbury, London, and was educated at Barnsbury Girls' School. In her mid 20s, she discovered feminism and became a campaigner. In 1986, she started working for the Stonewall Housing Association, which helps to arrange housing for lesbians and gay men who have faced homophobic discrimination. In 1993, she became the manager of Women's Aid in Camden, then later in Hackney.

In 2000, she became the head of Eaves for Women, a charity that supports and advocates for female victims of rape, sexual violence and sex trafficking.

In 2007, she was awarded an OBE for services to disadvantaged women. To protest cuts by the Conservative—Liberal Democrat coalition government that would affect the ability of charities to help vulnerable women, she returned her OBE.

In 2014, she was diagnosed with inoperable cancer in her stomach and small intestine. She died in August 2015, leaving behind her partner Lisa and her son Declan.
