= Public bodies of the Scottish Government =

Public bodies of the Scottish Government (Scottish Gaelic: Buidhnean Poblach Riaghaltas na h-Alba) are organisations that are funded by the Scottish Government. They form a tightly meshed network of executive and advisory non-departmental public bodies ("quangoes"); tribunals; and nationalised industries. Such public bodies are distinct from executive agencies of the Scottish Government, as unlike them they are not considered to be part of the Government and staff of public bodies are not civil servants, although executive agencies are listed in the Scottish Government's directory of national public bodies alongside other public bodies.

== Governance ==
The Scottish Government is responsible for appointing a board of directors to run public bodies. The Office of the Commissioner for Public Appointments in Scotland is responsible for regulating the process.

Public bodies are assigned "sponsoring departments" who provide funding in the form of grant-in-aid to assist with running costs and capital investment. Most public bodies also have other sources of income (for example the Royal Botanic Garden Edinburgh receives income from charging the public to visit the greenhouses in its gardens).

== List of public bodies ==
=== Non-ministerial offices ===
Non-ministerial offices are staffed by civil servants, but do not form part of the Scottish Government. They are accountable to, and funded by the Scottish Parliament, and publish their own annual reports and accounts. Each office is headed by a board or statutory officeholder(s) appointed by the Scottish Government.

- Consumer Scotland
- Environmental Standards Scotland
- Food Standards Scotland
- National Records of Scotland
- Office of the Scottish Charity Regulator
- Registers of Scotland
- Revenue Scotland
- Scottish Courts and Tribunals Service
- Scottish Fiscal Commission
- Scottish Housing Regulator

=== Executive non-departmental public bodies ===
Executive NDPBs carry out work on behalf of government but do not form part of it, nor are they directly accountable to parliament. They operate within a framework of governance and accountability set by Ministers; often this is defined in specific legislation setting up each body. They employ their own staff, who are not civil servants.

- Accounts Commission for Scotland
- Architecture and Design Scotland
- Bòrd na Gàidhlig
- Cairngorms National Park Authority
- Care Inspectorate
- Children's Hearings Scotland
- Community Justice Scotland
- Creative Scotland
- Crofting Commission
- David MacBrayne Ltd
- Ferguson Marine (Port Glasgow) Ltd
- Highlands and Islands Airports Ltd
- Highlands and Islands Enterprise
- Historic Environment Scotland
- Independent Living Fund Scotland
- The Loch Lomond and the Trossachs National Park Authority
- National Galleries of Scotland
- National Library of Scotland
- National Museums Scotland
- NatureScot
- Police Investigations and Review Commissioner
- Quality Meat Scotland
- Redress Scotland
- Risk Management Authority
- Royal Botanic Garden Edinburgh
- Scottish Agricultural Wages Board
- Scottish Canals
- Scottish Children's Reporter Administration
- Scottish Criminal Cases Review Commission
- Scottish Enterprise
- Scottish Environment Protection Agency
- Scottish Funding Council
- Scottish Futures Trust
- Scottish Land Commission
- Scottish Legal Aid Board
- Scottish Legal Complaints Commission
- Scottish National Investment Bank
- Scottish Qualifications Authority
- Scottish Rail Holdings
- Scottish Social Services Council
- Skills Development Scotland
- South of Scotland Enterprise
- sportscotland
- VisitScotland
- Water Industry Commission for Scotland
- Zero Waste Scotland

=== Advisory non-departmental public bodies ===
Advisory NDPBs are similar to Executive NDPBs, but do not undertake activities directly. They provide independent expert advice to the government and others in relation to particular subject. They do not normally employ staff, with administrative support usually being provided by civil servants.

- Boundaries Scotland
- Judicial Appointments Board for Scotland
- Mobility and Access Committee for Scotland
- National Smart Ticketing Advisory Board (NSTAB)
- Poverty and Inequality Commission for Scotland
- Scottish Advisory Committee on Distinction Awards
- Scottish Commission on Social Security
- Scottish Fuel Poverty Advisory Panel
- Scottish Law Commission

=== Tribunals ===
Tribunals undertake judicial functions, but do not form part of the court system. They are independent of government, and are not responsible for budgets or expenditure other than remuneration for tribunal members.

- First-tier Tribunal for Scotland
- Parole Board for Scotland
- Upper Tribunal for Scotland

=== Public corporations ===
Public corporations are companies which recover more than 50% of their costs through commercial activities. They are managed by a board whose members are appointed by the government. Public corporations employ their own staff (who are not civil servants) and manage their own budgets.

- Caledonian Maritime Assets Ltd
- Crown Estate Scotland
- Glasgow Prestwick Airport
- Scottish Water

=== Executive agencies ===
Executive agencies form part of the Scottish Government, but have a specific, well-defined remit. They are staffed by civil servants and headed by a Chief Executive, who is a civil servant, and are directly accountable to the government.

- Accountant in Bankruptcy
- Disclosure Scotland
- Education Scotland
- Forestry and Land Scotland
- National Social Work Agency
- Scottish Forestry
- Scottish Prison Service
- Scottish Public Pensions Agency
- Social Security Scotland
- Student Awards Agency for Scotland
- Transport Scotland

=== Commissioners and ombudsmen ===
Commissioners and ombudsmen are responsible for monitoring the actions of government and public boards. They are responsible to parliament, and appointed by the Scottish Parliamentary Corporate Body, in order to ensure their independence from government.

- Ethical Standards Commissioner
- Scotland's Commissioner For Children and Young People
- Scottish Biometrics Commissioner
- Scottish Human Rights Commission
- Scottish Information Commissioner
- Scottish Public Services Ombudsman
- Standards Commission for Scotland

=== Health bodies ===
- NHS Ayrshire and Arran
- NHS Borders
- NHS Dumfries and Galloway
- NHS Fife
- NHS Forth Valley
- NHS Grampian
- NHS Greater Glasgow and Clyde
- NHS Highland
- NHS Lanarkshire
- NHS Lothian
- NHS Orkney
- NHS Shetland
- NHS Tayside
- NHS Western Isles
- Healthcare Improvement Scotland
- Mental Welfare Commission for Scotland
- National Waiting Times Centre Board
- NHS 24
- NHS Education for Scotland
- NHS National Services Scotland
- Public Health Scotland
- Scottish Ambulance Service Board
- State Hospital Board for Scotland

=== Other significant national bodies ===
- Audit Scotland
- Convener of School Closure Review Panels
- Court of the Lord Lyon
- Drinking Water Quality Regulator for Scotland
- HM Chief Inspector of Prisons for Scotland
- HM Chief Inspector of Prosecution in Scotland
- HM Fire Service Inspectorate in Scotland
- HM Inspector of Constabulary for Scotland
- Justices of the Peace Advisory Committee (x6)
- Office of the King's Printer for Scotland
- Police Negotiating Board for Scotland
- Scottish Fire and Rescue Service
- Scottish Police Authority
- Scottish Road Works Commissioner
