= Caroline Lamb =

Chief Executive of NHS Scotland

Chief Executive of NHS Scotland
- Incumbent
- Assumed office January 2021
- Preceded by: John Connaghan (acting); Malcolm Wright

Director-General of Health and Social Care
- Incumbent
- Assumed office January 2021
- Preceded by: Elinor Mitchell

Personal details
- Education: King's College London

Caroline Lamb has served as the Chief Executive of NHS Scotland and Director General of Health and Social Care directorates since 2021.

== Early life ==
Lamb studied at the King's College London, before training as a chartered accountant with KPMG. She worked with clients Castle Cement, Citibank, Nestlé and the International Committee of the Red Cross in Geneva.

== Career ==
Lamb qualified as a chartered accountant and later moved to Scotland, where she worked as the Director of Finance and Corporate Resources in NHS Education for Scotland (NES) from 2004 to 2014. She later served as the Acting Chief Executive for NES, before being appointed into the role on a full term basis the following year.

In December 2019, Lamb joined the Scottish Government, where she led the Digital Health and Care Directorate. Amid the COVID-19 pandemic, she took on further responsibility for leading on the COVID-19 related ICU surge requirements; acting as Portfolio Director for Test and Protect in May 2020; and becoming Delivery Director for the Extended Seasonal Flu and COVID-19 vaccination programmes in August 2020.

In December 2020, she was announced as the new Chief Executive of NHS Scotland, as well as the new Director-General of the Scottish Government's Health and Social Care Directorates. She assumed both offices the following month.
