= Children's Hearings Scotland =

Scottish body for child justice and welfare

Agency overview
- Formed: 2013
- Type: Executive non-departmental public body
- Jurisdiction: Scotland
- Headquarters: Ladywell House, Ladywell Road, Edinburgh
- Employees: 42 (Q1 2022)
- Annual budget: £5.0 m (2022-23)
- Agency executive: Elliot Jackson, Chief Executive
- Website: www.chscotland.gov.uk

Children's Hearings Scotland is an executive non-departmental public body of the Scottish Government, responsible for aspects of the administration of the country's system of children's hearings. It recruits, trains and supports the volunteers who sit on the panels that hear cases brought to it by the Scottish Children's Reporter Administration.

The body was formed in 2013, taking over responsibility from 32 local authority panels to form a single national children's panel. As of 2022, it support around 3,000 volunteers who sit on the panels, or support those who do. Although the organisation has a national remit, panels are arranged on a local basis, with 22 Area Support Teams (ASTs) supporting panel members at a local level across Scotland.

== Children's Hearings ==
A children's hearing is part of the legal and welfare systems in Scotland; it aims to combine justice and welfare for children and young people. The children's hearings system was initiated by the Social Work (Scotland) Act 1968 (c. 49), and further reinforced by Children (Scotland) Act 1995 and Children's Hearings (Scotland) Act 2011. It followed a report in April 1964 of a committee set up by the Secretary of State for Scotland under the chairmanship of Lord Kilbrandon, a Senator of the College of Justice, to examine how young offenders were dealt with.

A children's hearing is carried out by three specially trained lay tribunal members of the children's panel, whose role is to make legal decisions about how to best protect and care for the child or young person in question based on the circumstances and the child or young person’s views.
