= Cornerstone (charity) =

Scottish charity and social enterprise

- Trade name: Cornerstone Community Care
- Company type: Not-for-profit
- Industry: Social Care
- Founded: 28 February 1980; 46 years ago in Aberdeen, Scotland.
- Headquarters: Aberdeen, Scotland; Offices: Aberdeen, Airdrie, Dundee, Dunfermline, Edinburgh, Elgin, Glasgow, Irvine, Kirkintilloch, Perth, Peterhead, Renton Stonehaven
- Area served: Aberdeen; Aberdeenshire; Angus; Argyll & Bute; Dundee; East Ayrshire; East Dunbartonshire; East Lothian; Edinburgh; Fife; Glasgow; Midlothian; Moray; North Ayrshire; North Lanarkshire; Perth & Kinross; Scottish Borders; South Ayrshire; West Dunbartonshire; West Lothian
- Key people: Peter Bailey (Chairman); Hazel Brown (Chief Executive)
- Services: Adult placement. Fostering and family placement. Housing support. Short breaks and respite care. Support service: care at home. Support service: day care for adults.
- Revenue: 329,169 pound sterling (2004)
- Number of employees: 2,100
- Website: www.cornerstone.org.uk

Cornerstone, formerly known as Cornerstone Community Care, is a Scottish charity and social enterprise that provides care and support for people with learning disabilities, autism and complex care needs. It was founded in 1980 in Aberdeen and, since obtaining charitable status in 1981^{[1]}, Cornerstone has grown to become one of the largest charities in Scotland^{[2]}.

== History ==
Nicholas (Nick) Baxter formed Cornerstone in 1980 when he brought together a group of parents and professionals who were concerned about the lack and quality of services available to people with learning disabilities and their families. They wanted to provide community based support for people with special needs and Cornerstone's aim became 'to enable people we support to enjoy a valued life'.

Cornerstone opened its first residential service in 1982. By 2007 the charity was providing help in around 150 locations for almost 1,300 children, young people and adults with learning disabilities and other special needs.^{[3]} The 2017/2018 annual review reports 2,400 children and adults being supported.^{[4]}

Baxter retired as Cornerstone's Chief Executive in May 2008. He died in May 2013. Hazel Brown is the current Chief Executive.

In 2017 the charity restructured, using some of the principles of the Dutch model Buurtzorg. It devolved decision-making and accountability to ten branches that cover most of the country. It reduced layers of management and set out on a mission to up-skill and empower local staff to become self-organised local care and support teams (LCAST).

A new strategy was launched in 2021 - ‘Future-proofing Cornerstone’. It followed on from a significant review of the previous strategy ‘Local Cornerstone’. It took forward the learning and achievements from that strategy but also left behind the parts that hadn't worked quite so well. There are now ten branches across Scotland.

== See also ==
- Health and Social Care Partnerships
- Social care in Scotland
- Office of the Scottish Charity Regulator
- SSSC
- Care Inspectorate (Scotland)
- Social care in Scotland
