= Noemi Lois =

Irish ophthalmologist

Noemi Lois is a Clinical Professor of Ophthalmology at Queen's University Belfast and an Honorary Consultant Ophthalmologist and Vitreoretinal Surgeon at the Belfast Health and Social Care Trust.

== Clinical Activities ==
Noemi is an Honorary Consultant Ophthalmic Vitreoretinal surgeon, clinically active. Noemi undertakes medical and surgical retina clinics, vitreoretinal and cataract surgery at the Belfast Health and Social Care Trust.

== Academic Activities ==
Noemi's academic work is focused in identifying and evaluating novel technologies to improve eye care. Her academic portfolio includes a range of translational activities investigating mechanisms of disease and novel therapeutic targets, and also assessments of effectiveness and cost-effectiveness of technologies and models of care for eye diseases.

Noemi is an ad-hoc referee for numerous peer-review journals and funding bodies including the Health Technology Assessment (HTA) programme and the Efficacy of Mechanisms (EME) programmes of the National Institute for Health Research (NIHR) and Wellcome Trust.

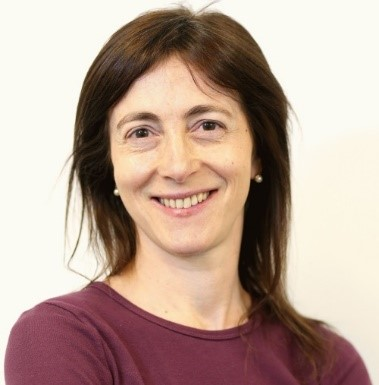
Professor Noemi Lois

She was awarded the King James IV Professorship by the Royal College of Surgeons of Edinburgh in 2024. She delivered the Meyer-Schwickerath Lecture at the 36th International Congress of German Ophthalmic Surgeons (DOC) in Nuremberg.

Noemi has received numerous grants to support her programme of research.

- Noemi has been Chief Investigator of several publicly funded multi-centre trials, including FILMS, on surgical techniques for macular hole (funded by the Chief Scientist Office, Scotland - Lois N et al. Invest Ophthalmol Vis Sci. 2011;52(3):1586-1592), DIAMONDS, on laser surgery for diabetic macular oedema (funded by the Health Technology Assessment of the National Institute for Health and Care Research, HTA-NIHR - Lois N et al. Trials. 2019;20(1):122; Lois N et al. Ophthalmology. 2023 Jan;130(1):14-27; Lois N et al. Health Technol Assess. 2022 Dec;26(50):1-86) and EMERALD, on multimodal imaging and new pathways of care for people with complications of diabetic retinopathy (funded by the NIHR HTA – Lois N et al. BMJ Open. 2019;9(6):e027795; Lois N et al. Health Technol Assess. 2021 May;25(32):1-104; Lois N et al. Ophthalmology. 2021 Apr;128(4):561-573; Maredza M, Mistry H, Lois N, et al. Br J Ophthalmol. 2022 Nov;106(11):1549-1554; Prior L, Lois N; EMERALD Study Group. Eye 2023;37:1155-1159). Noemi is co-lead of RECOGNISED, a multicentric consortium investigating diabetes, cognitive impairment and dementia, funded by the EU Horizon 2020, and has just recently received HTA-NIHR-support to conduct two large UK-wide randomized clinical trials which will commence this year: DAME, which will compare clinical effectiveness, cost-effectiveness, patient experience and acceptability of anti-VEGF therapies versus combined anti-VEGF therapy and subthreshold micropulse laser (SML) for people with severe diabetic macular oedema, with SML applied once central retinal thickness goes below 400 microns following anti-VEGFs; and COMBAT: To determine clinical and cost-effectiveness, safety and patient experience and acceptability of phacovitrectomy, compared with vitrectomy and subsequent cataract surgery (if/when needed), for non-highly myopic phakic rhegmatogenous retinal detachment, and to set basis for its implementation.
- Medical Research Council (MRC), STREAMLINE – Stratifying treatment for diabetic macular oedema using induced pluripotent stem cell technology (£78K)
- the Centre for Public Health, Performance of EArly Retinal Laser (PEARL) (£146K) among others.

Professor Lois leads a programme of clinical and preclinical research into diabetic retinopathy at the Wellcome-Wolfson Institute for Experimental Medicine, Queen's University Belfast and has published over 100 articles in peer-reviewed journals. She is the editor of three textbooks, one of which on its second edition and has authored over 13 book chapters. Noemi has supervised numerous PhD, MSc and BSc students as well as clinical fellows.

Noemi is a reviewer for grant funding bodies including the Health Technology Assessment (HTA) programme and for the Efficacy of Mechanisms (EME) programmes of the National Institute for Health Research (NIHR) and Wellcome Trust
