= NHS Scotland =

Publicly-funded healthcare system in Scotland

Public healthcare service overview
- Formed: 5 July 1948; 78 years ago
- Preceding agencies: Highlands and Islands Medical Service; Emergency Hospital Service
- Jurisdiction: Scotland
- Employees: 160,066 WTE (June 2024)
- Annual budget: £21 billion (2025–26)
- Minister responsible: Angela Constance, Cabinet Secretary for Health and Care
- Deputy Ministers responsible: Jenni Minto, Minister for Public Health and Women's Health; Maree Todd, Minister for Social Care, Mental Wellbeing and Sport
- Public healthcare service executives: Caroline Lamb, Director-General, Health and Social Care and Chief Executive of NHS Scotland; John Burns, Chief Operating Officer; Paula Speirs, Deputy Chief Operating Officer, Planning and Sponsorship; Dougie McLaren, Deputy Chief Operating Officer, Performance and Delivery
- Parent department: Health and Social Care Directorates
- Child agencies: 14 regional NHS boards; Healthcare Improvement Scotland; NHS 24; Public Health Scotland; NHS National Waiting Times Centre; Scottish Ambulance Service; State Hospitals Board for Scotland; Public Services Delivery Scotland
- Website: www.scot.nhs.uk

NHS Scotland, sometimes styled NHSScotland, is the publicly-funded healthcare system in Scotland and one of the four systems that make up the National Health Service in the United Kingdom. It operates 14 territorial NHS boards across Scotland, supported by six special non-geographic health boards, and Public Health Scotland.

At the founding of the National Health Service in the United Kingdom, three separate institutions were created in Scotland, England and Wales and Northern Ireland. The NHS in Scotland was accountable to the Secretary of State for Scotland rather than the Secretary of State for Health and Social Care as in England and Wales. Prior to 1948, a publicly funded healthcare system, the Highlands and Islands Medical Service, had been established in Scotland in 1913.

Following Scottish devolution in 1999, health and social care policy and funding became devolved to the Scottish Parliament. It is currently administered through the Health and Social Care Directorates of the Scottish Government. The current Cabinet Secretary for Health and Care is Angela Constance, and the head of staff is the director-general health and social care and chief executive of NHS Scotland, Caroline Lamb.

== Origins and history ==
=== Before 1948 ===
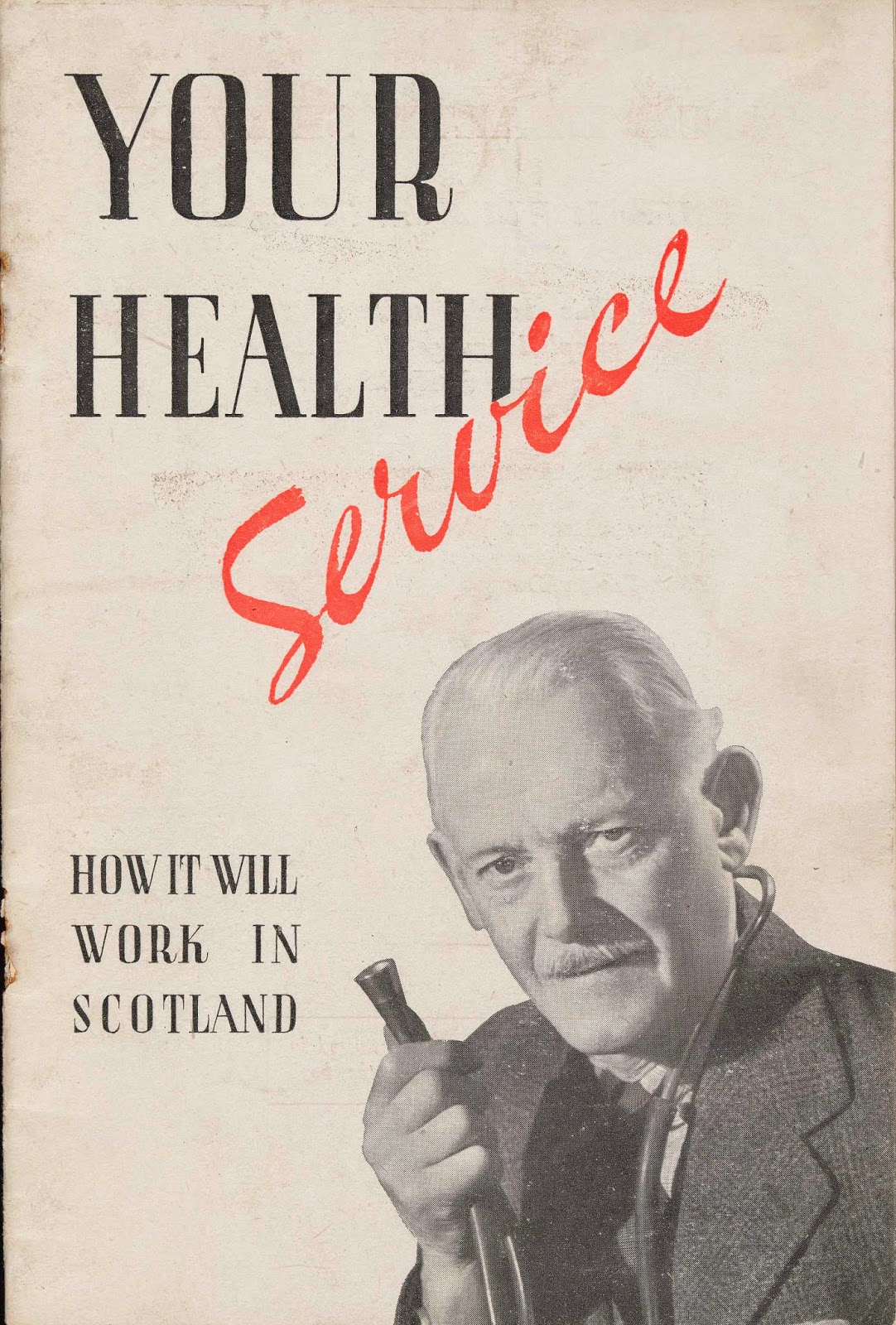
Advertising pamphlet issued prior to the national rollout of the NHS in Scotland, 1948

Prior to the creation of NHS in Scotland in 1948, the state was involved with the provision of healthcare, though it was not universal. Half of Scotland's landmass was already covered by the Highlands and Islands Medical Service, a state-funded health system run directly from Edinburgh, which had been set up 35 years earlier to address a deficiency in the panel system, which required workers who earned less than £160 per year to pay 4d per week. Fourpence per week was beyond the means of most crofters at the time, who were subsistence farmers but often provided many troops for British armed forces. Average crofting families' income in some areas could be as low as £26 per annum (10/- or 120d per week) or even lower. The additional challenges of delivering medical care in the sparsely populated highlands and islands with poor infrastructure were also funded by the Highlands and Islands Medical Service.

During the Second World War, the Emergency Hospital Service (Scotland) built many hospitals intended to treat wartime casualties and injuries. These hospitals initially lay idle and so the Scottish Secretary at the time decided to use the hospital capacity to reduce long waiting lists for treatment.

Scotland also had its own distinctive medical tradition, centred on its medical schools rather than private practice, and a detailed plan for the future of health provision based on the Cathcart report.

=== Development of a National Health Service ===
Following the publication of the Beveridge Report in 1942, the UK Government responded with a white paper, A National Health Service (Cmd. 6502) in 1944 led by the Conservative MP and Minister for Health Henry Willink. In its introduction, the white paper laid out the Government's intention to have the new health service operate in Scotland--

"The decision to establish the new service applies, of course, to Scotland as well as to England and Wales and the present Paper is concerned with both countries. The differing circumstances of Scotland are bound to involve certain differences of method and of organisation, although not of scope or of object ... Throughout the Paper references to the Minister should normally be construed as references to the Minister of Health in the case of England and Wales and the Secretary of State for Scotland in the case of Scotland."

=== Founding of the NHS in Scotland ===
The UK Parliament passed the National Health Service (Scotland) Act 1947, which came into effect on 5 July 1948. This foundational legislation has since been superseded.

The NHS in Scotland was created as an administratively separate organisation in 1948 under the ministerial oversight of the Scottish Office, before being politically devolved in 1999. This separation of powers and financing is not always apparent to the general public due to the co-ordination and co-operation where cross-border emergency care is involved.

This Act provided a uniform national structure for services which had previously been provided by a combination of the Highlands and Islands Medical Service, local government, charities and private organisations which in general was only free for emergency use. The new system was funded from central taxation and did not generally involve a charge at the time of use for services concerned with existing medical conditions or vaccinations carried out as a matter of general public health requirements; prescription charges were a later introduction in 1951.

== Structure ==
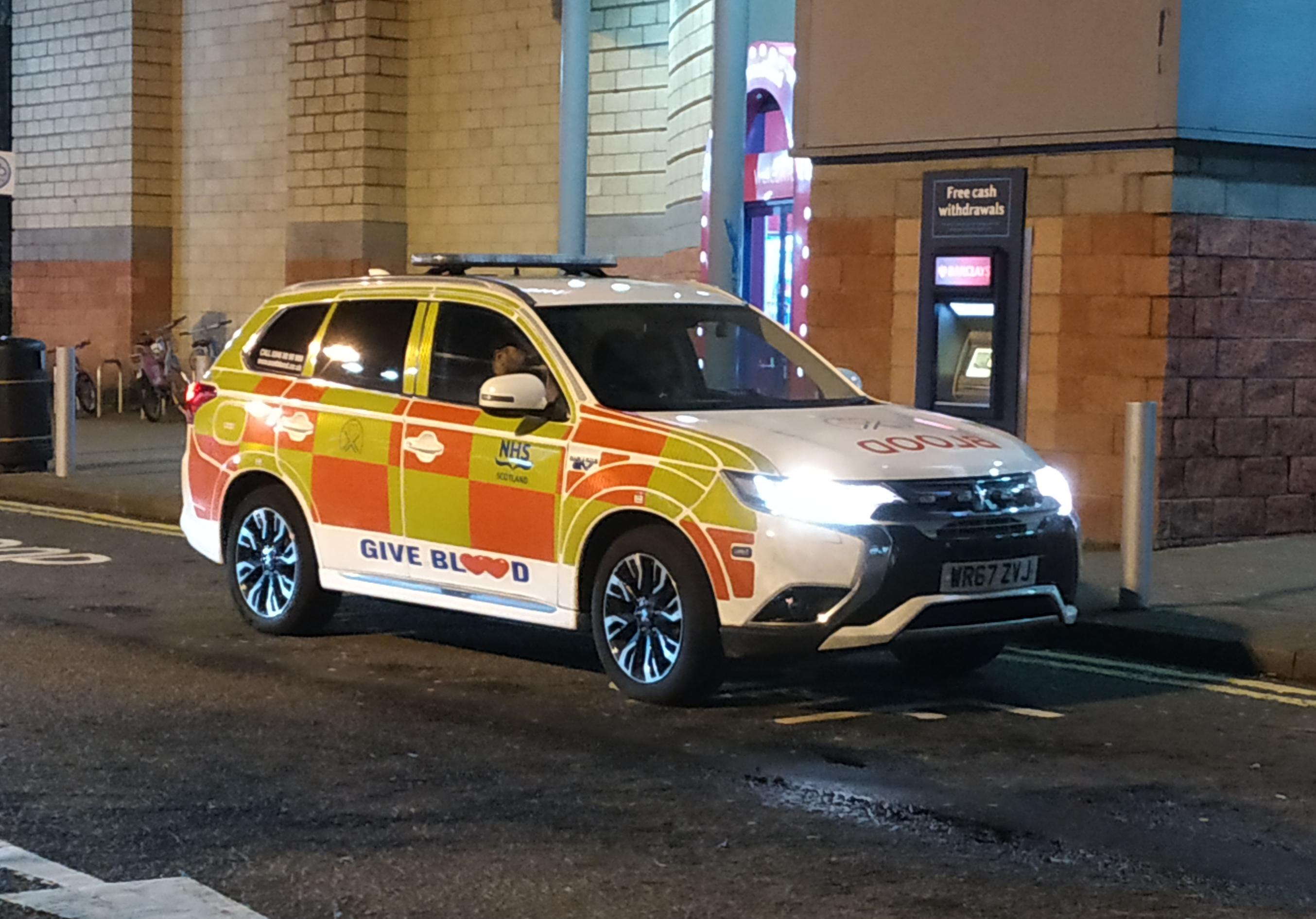
Scottish National Blood Transfusion Service vehicle in Glasgow

Current provision of healthcare is the responsibility of 14 geographically based local NHS boards, six national special health boards, supported by Public Health Scotland, plus many small contractors for primary care services. Hospitals, district nursing services and healthcare planning are managed by health boards. Government policy has been to use the National Waiting Times centre to address waiting lists and limit use of the private sector.

=== Budget ===
NHS Scotland had an operating budget of £15.3 billion in 2020/21. The 2025–26 Scottish budget allocated an annual budget of £21 billion to NHS Scotland, an increase of £139 million from the previous years budget.

=== Workforce ===
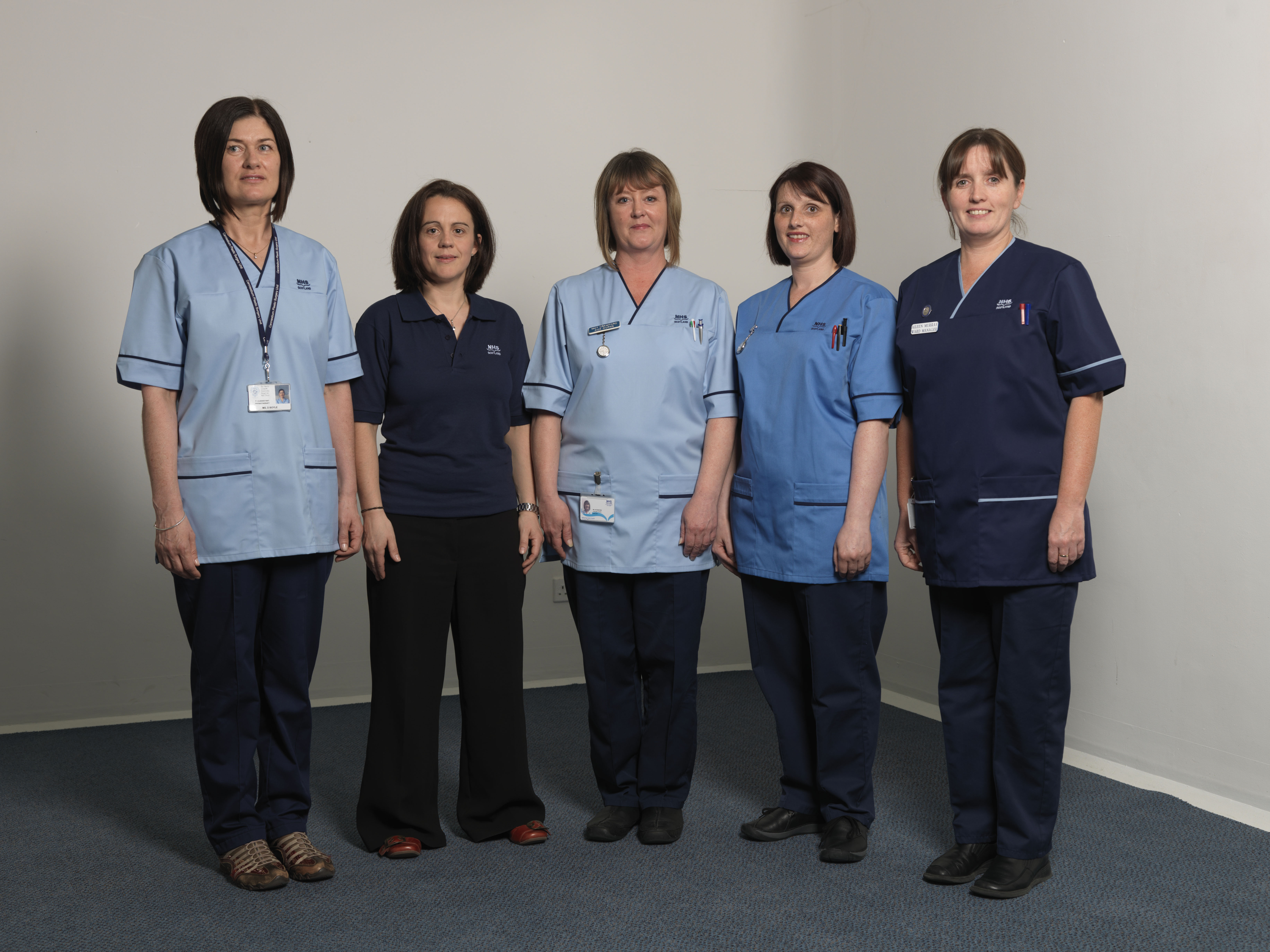
NHS Scotland staff displaying the new uniforms introduced in 2008

Approximately 160,000 staff work across 14 regional NHS Boards, six Special NHS Boards and one public health body, More than 12,000 of these healthcare staff are engaged under independent contractor arrangements. Descriptions of staff numbers can be expressed as headcount and by Whole-Time Equivalent (WTE) which is an estimate that helps to take account of full and part-time work patterns.

Scotland's healthcare workforce includes:

- around 67,000 nurses, midwives and health visitors (providing around 58,000 WTE)
- over 4,900 consultants (providing around 4600 WTE)
- more than 4,800 general practitioners (providing around 3,700 WTE)
- more than 500 nurse practitioners and 1,600 registered nurses working in GP surgeries.
- dentists
- around 4,000 pharmacists, mostly working in community pharmacy positions, with around 1,200 retail pharmacies across Scotland.
- opticians
- allied health professionals
- Healthcare scientists play an important role in the prevention, diagnosis and treatment of a wide range of medical conditions, as well as in rehabilitation. Healthcare science staff are essential members of the healthcare team.
- administrators, clerical and domestic staff.

=== Primary care ===
To have access to NHS services, patients should register with a General Practice. Most often this will be an independent contractor who has agreed to provide general medical services to patients, funded on a capitation basis, with weighting given for the age distribution, poverty, and rurality. Various services are provided free of charge by General Practitioners (GPs), who are responsible for maintaining a comprehensive medical record, usually affording some continuity of care. There is no option to self-refer to specialists in Scotland unlike many European countries. GP surgeries consist of partner GPs who are responsible for running the practice, and may include GPs employed by the practice and paid a salary, but who do not have any responsibility in running the surgery. In some instances, GPs are directly employed by the local health board, such as in parts of the Highlands and Islands.

The NHS in Scotland also covers dentistry for patients who have registered with a dentist who has agreed to provide services to NHS patients. Most dentists in Scotland have a mixture of NHS patients and private patients. Check-ups are free, however dentists charge patients a regulated fee. Patients in Scotland must pay up to 80% of the total cost of the treatment unless they qualify for free treatment or help with costs. Dentists are remunerated through a voucher towards treatment and patients can choose to have more expensive treatments if they are willing and able to do so. This is mostly commonly seen with dental amalgam restorations on molars, which are available on the NHS, whereas composite resin restorations are not. The patient 'opts-out' of the NHS treatment and pays for the composite restoration as temporary private patient, but remains an NHS patient for future checkups.

Community pharmacies in Scotland also provide prescribed medicines free of charge, where the patient is registered with a GP Surgery based in Scotland, and where the appropriate prescription-voucher is given. Like GPs, they are private providers who deliver NHS services under contract. Pharmacists are increasingly delivering services which were once the responsibilities of GPs, such as flu vaccinations as well as offering advice on skin problems, gastrointestinal problems and other minor illnesses. Pharmacies in Scotland are frequently located inside Chemists' shops and supermarkets. While there are no prescription charges in Scotland, prescription-vouchers are not ordinarily given in Scotland for certain medicines - such as acetaminophen and ibuprofen - as these are available without a prescription at very low prices in most chemists and supermarkets.

Most optometrists in Scotland also provide NHS services, and provide eye examinations, which includes retinal health checks and other eye screening services in addition to sight tests. Entitlements are mainly for corrective lenses and a predetermined set of frames - which were once known as 'NHS glasses' which attracted some social stigma until the range of frames was extended.

=== Secondary care ===
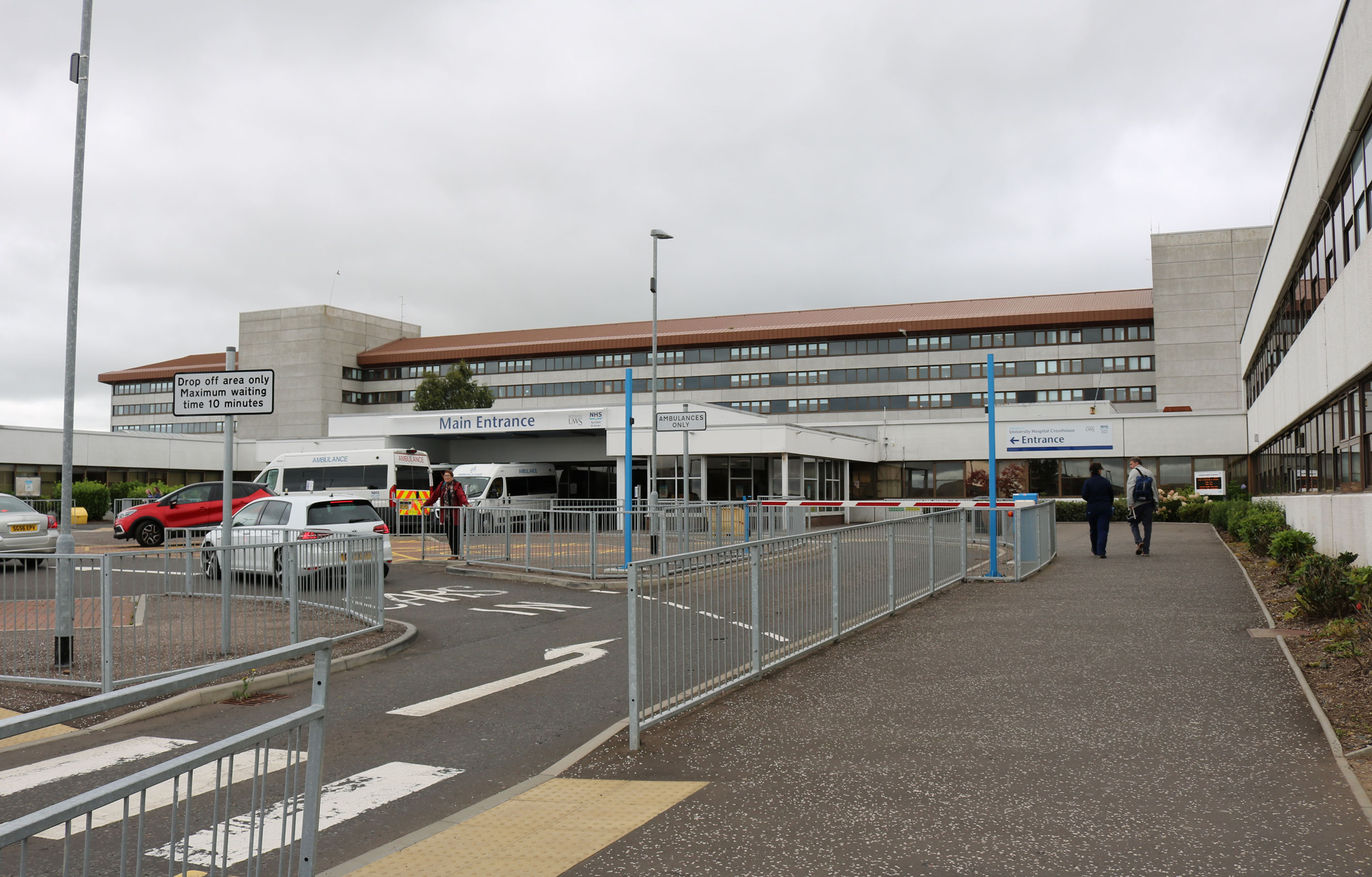
University Hospital Crosshouse is the largest NHS hospital within Ayrshire and Arran.

Hospital services are delivered directly by the National Health Service in Scotland. Since devolution, Scottish healthcare policy has been to move away from market-based solutions and towards direct delivery, rather than using the private or voluntary sectors. Proposals for the establishment of fifteen NHS boards were announced by the Scottish Executive Health Department in December 2000. Further details about the role and function of the unified NHS health boards were provided in May 2001. From 1 October 2001 each geographical health board area had a single NHS board that was responsible for improving health and health services across their local area, replacing the previous decision-making structures of 43 separate boards and trusts.

In April 2004, Scotland's health care system became an integrated service under the management of NHS boards. Local authority nominees were added to board membership to improve co-ordination of health and social care. The remaining 16 Trusts were dissolved from 1 April 2004. Hospitals are now managed by the acute division of the NHS board. Primary care services such as GPs and pharmacies would continue to be contracted through the NHS board, but from 2004 were considered part of the remit of Community Health Partnerships (CHPs), structures based largely on local authority boundaries and including local authority membership of their boards. By April 2014, there were new joint working arrangements in place between the NHS boards and local authorities came into effect that also included responsibility for social care. Their new organisations, which took over from CHPs are called Health and Social Care Partnerships (HSCPs).

In 2021 a new national Centre for Sustainable Delivery was established to bring together national programmes for scheduled and unscheduled care, waiting times and best practice – and ensure health boards are implementing them.

=== Health boards ===
Labelled map of the boards

There are 14 health boards (HBs) which are the upper tier of the Scottish health care system, reporting directly to the Scottish Government. They were created in 1974 as a result of the National Health Service (Scotland) Act 1972 and are based on groups of the local government districts that existed between 1975 and 1996.

There were initially 15 HBs in 1974 but the Argyll and Clyde HB was abolished and its area absorbed into the Highland and Greater Glasgow HBs on 1 April 2006, with the latter renamed to NHS Greater Glasgow and Clyde. The part of the NHS Argyll and Clyde area which transferred to NHS Highland corresponds to the Argyll and Bute council area.

According to Public Health Scotland data, the 2019 population sizes of the regional health boards were estimated to be:

No	Name	Areas covered	Population
1	NHS Ayrshire and Arran	East Ayrshire, North Ayrshire, South Ayrshire	368,690
2	NHS Borders	Scottish Borders	116,020
3	NHS Dumfries and Galloway	Dumfries and Galloway	148,790
4	NHS Western Isles (Scottish Gaelic: NHS nan Eilean Siar)	Outer Hebrides	26,640
5	NHS Fife	Fife	374,730
6	NHS Forth Valley	Clackmannanshire, Falkirk, Stirling	305,710
7	NHS Grampian	Aberdeenshire, City of Aberdeen, Moray	586,530
8	NHS Greater Glasgow and Clyde	City of Glasgow, East Dunbartonshire, East Renfrewshire, Inverclyde, Renfrewshire, West Dunbartonshire	1,185,040
9	NHS Highland	Highland, Argyll and Bute	324,280
10	NHS Lanarkshire	North Lanarkshire, South Lanarkshire	664,030
11	NHS Lothian	City of Edinburgh, East Lothian, Midlothian, West Lothian	916,310
12	NHS Orkney	Orkney Islands	22,540
13	NHS Shetland	Shetland Islands	22,940
14	NHS Tayside	Angus, City of Dundee, Perth and Kinross	417,650

In August 2026, First Minister of Scotland, John Swinney, announced the 14 health boards would be reduced to only two health boards, one east and one west health board.

=== Elections to health boards ===
In January 2008, the Scottish Government announced plans for legislation to bring in direct elections as a way to select people for non-executive positions on health boards. The Health Committee of the Scottish Parliament had supported plans for directly elected members as a way that might improve public representation. This plan was abandoned in 2013 after trials in Fife and Dumfries and Galloway resulted in low voter turnout.

=== Special health boards ===
Local health boards are supported by six national special health boards providing national services, some of which have further publicised subdivisions, including:

- Healthcare Improvement Scotland
- Scottish Ambulance Service (The single public emergency ambulance service in Scotland)
- The Golden Jubilee University National Hospital is a special NHS Board in Scotland with the purpose of reducing waiting times using a single modern hospital located at Clydebank. It was previously a private sector hospital built at a cost of £180 million, but was bought in 2002 by the Scottish Executive for £37.5 million after it failed to produce a profit despite being established with the help of a subsidy provided by a previous government.
- The State Hospitals Board for Scotland is responsible for the secure psychiatric hospital at Carstairs, which provides high security services for mentally disordered offenders and others who pose a high risk to themselves or others.
- NHS 24 runs a telephone advice and triage service that cover the out of hours period, more recently also providing a national telehealth service.
- Public Services Delivery Scotland The amalgamation of NHS Education for Scotland and NHS National Services Scotland under the Common Services Agency (CSA) to provide education, training and other common services for NHS Scotland boards.

The six boards are supported by Public Health Scotland, which is responsible for public health, including national health protection, and health education from April 2020)

NHS Health Scotland, Health Protection Scotland and Information Services Division were succeeded by Public Health Scotland in April 2020. This new agency is a collaborative approach by both the Scottish Government and COSLA as a result of the Public Health Reform Programme.

NHS Education for Scotland and NHS National Services Scotland were succeeded by Public Services Delivery Scotland on 1 April 2026 in an effort to "reduce duplication, scale what works, giving frontline teams more time with patients".

=== Links with the NHS in England ===
The NHS in Scotland does have some services provided by the NHS in England – such as NHS Business Services Authority, which processes the payment of dental, optical and pharmacy vouchers and negotiates with pharmaceutical suppliers to negotiate prices per-item down. The costs for the medicines consumed is borne by the health board that patient's GP surgery is based in. Some very complex, low volume, highly-specialist hospital services are also provided by NHS trusts in England, such as the Hospital for Tropical Diseases in London. These trusts also treat patients from healthcare systems outside the UK.

=== Representative bodies ===
The Mental Welfare Commission for Scotland is an independent statutory body which protects people with a psychological disorder who are not able to look after their own interests. It is funded through the Scottish Government Health & Social Care Directorate, and follows the same financial framework as the NHS in Scotland.

The Scottish Health Council took over from local Health Councils on 31 March 2005.

=== Quality of healthcare ===
Regulation of most medical practitioners is a reserved matter, with doctors regulated by the General Medical Council of the United Kingdom, nurses by the Nursing and Midwifery Council, dentists, dental therapists, dental hygienists, dental technicians and dental nurses by the General Dental Council, optometrists by the General Optical Council, pharmacists by the General Pharmaceutical Council, and allied health professionals by the Health and Care Professions Council.

Inspection of premises is undertaken by Healthcare Environment Inspectorate and the Care Inspectorate.

There are separate institutions, independent of government such as Academy of Medical Royal Colleges and Faculties in Scotland, the Royal College of Physicians of Edinburgh, the Royal College of Surgeons of Edinburgh, and the Royal College of Physicians and Surgeons of Glasgow which are distinct from their counterparts elsewhere in the United Kingdom which support professionals in Scotland.

=== Other divisions ===
Other subdivisions of the Scottish NHS include:

- Health Protection Scotland (Part of NHS National Services Scotland responsible for health protection until April 2020
- Public Health Scotland, responsible for public health protection in Scotland since April 2020
- Scottish National Blood Transfusion Service

=== Test and Protect ===
During the COVID-19 pandemic, NHS Scotland established Test and Protect as the national contact tracing service to minimise the spread of the virus within Scotland.

== Central Register ==
The Central Register keeps records of patients resident in Scotland who have been registered with any of the health systems of the United Kingdom. It is maintained by the Registrar General. Its purposes include keeping GPs' patient lists up to date, the control of new NHS numbers issued in Scotland and assisting with medical research.

=== Patient identification ===
Scottish patients are identified using a ten-digit number known as the CHI Number. These are used to uniquely identify individuals, avoiding problems such as where health records of people with similar birth dates and names may be confused, or where ambiguously spelled or abbreviated names may lead to one patient having several different health records. In addition, CHI numbers are quoted in all clinical correspondence to ensure that there is no uncertainty over the patient in question. A similar system of NHS reference numbers has since been instituted by NHS England and Wales.

== Recent developments ==
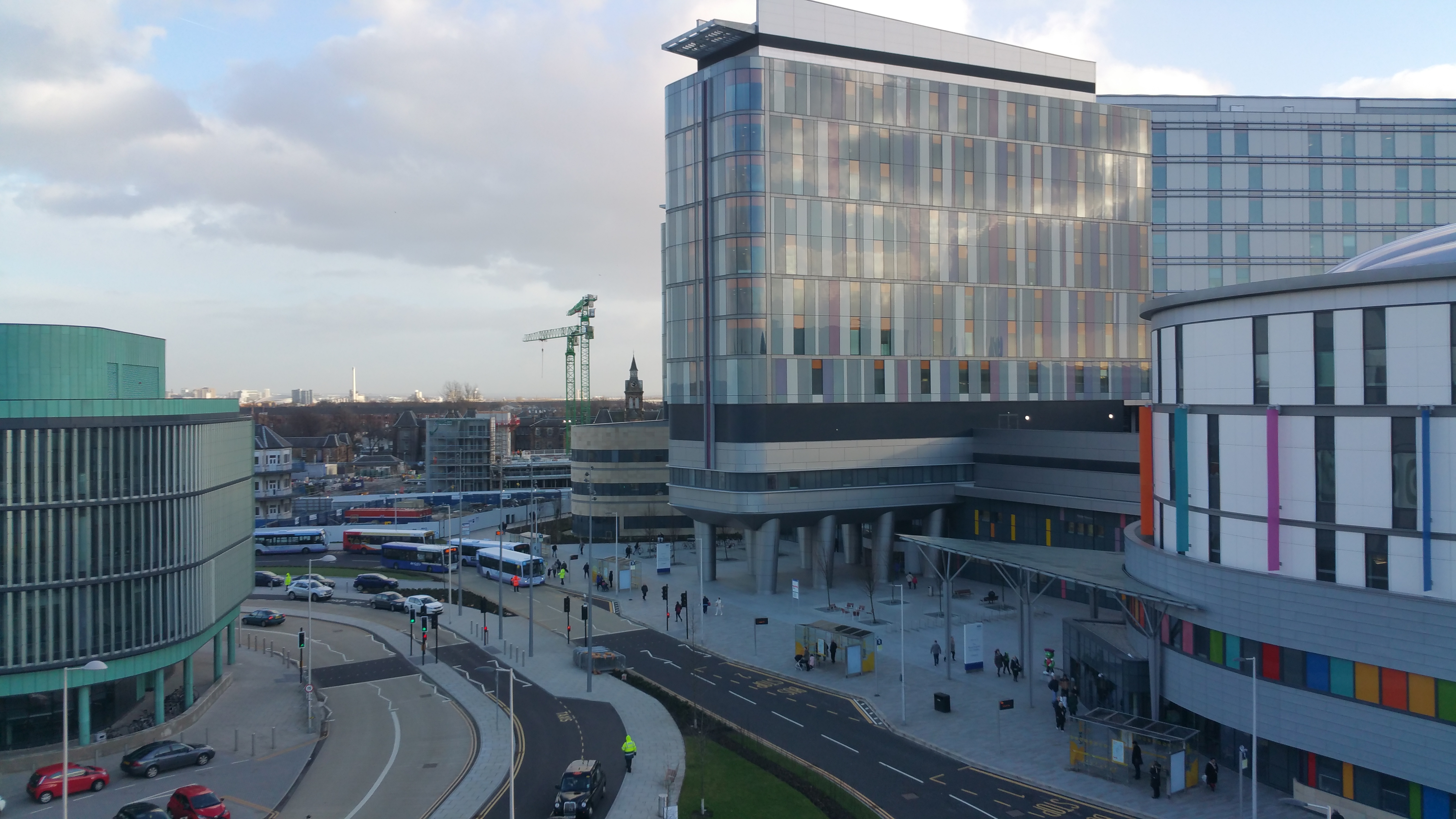
Queen Elizabeth University Hospital in Glasgow, the largest hospital campus in Europe

In 2000, the NHS boards were starting to help out researchers with their studies. The Scottish Dental Practice Board, for example, was helping out a study which looked at the significance of orthodontic treatment with fixed appliances. The SDPB shared 128 subjects with these researchers for analysis.

The SNP led Scottish Government, elected in May 2007, made it clear that it opposed the use of partnerships between the NHS and the private sector. Health Secretary Nicola Sturgeon voiced opposition to what she termed the "creeping privatisation" of the NHS, and called an end to the use of public money to help the private sector "compete" with the NHS. In September 2008, the Scottish Government announced that parking charges at hospitals were to be abolished except 3 where the car parks were managed under a private finance initiative scheme:

- Ninewells Hospital, Dundee
- The Royal Infirmary of Edinburgh
- Glasgow Royal Infirmary

Prescription charges were abolished in Scotland in 2011. Alex Neil defended the abolition in 2017 saying that restoring the charge would be a false economy, "Given that it costs on average £4,500 per week to keep patients in an acute hospital in Scotland, it's actually cheaper to keep them at home and give them the drugs to prevent them going into hospital."

=== Initiatives ===
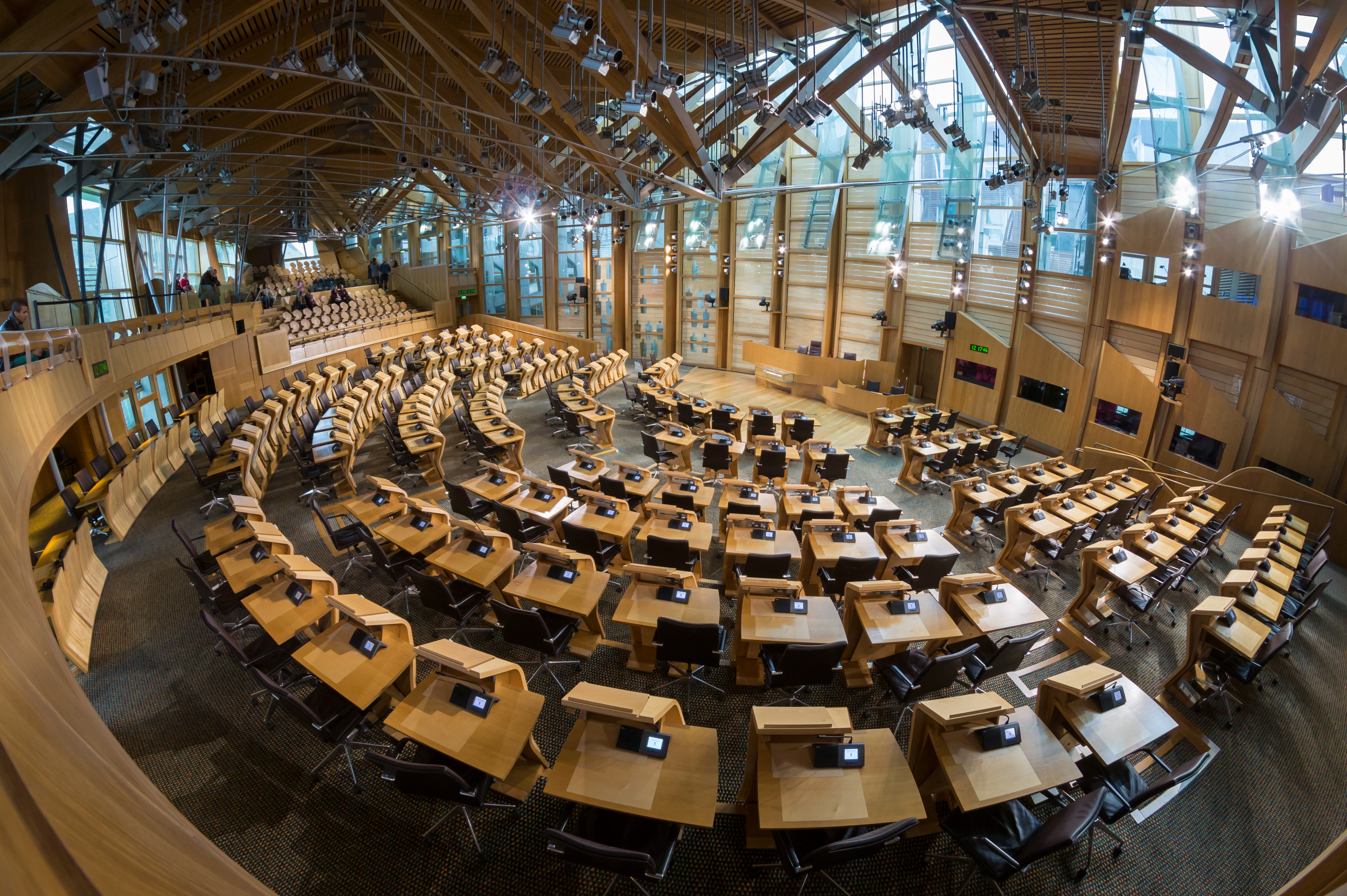
Legislation affecting NHS Scotland is a matter for the Scottish Parliament, with bills presented to parliament by the Scottish Government.

The National Health Service and Community Care Act 1990 introduced GP fundholding for certain elective procedures on a voluntary basis. Fundholding gave GPs significant influence over Trusts' decision making as a significant source of funding. GP Fundholding was subsequently abolished with the function transferring to Primary Care Trusts in 1998.

In 2001, NHS 24, was established to provide advice and triage services for patients outside of the 'core hours' of 08:00–18:30 on any working day. They can also advise of pharmacy opening hours. In 2002, the Scottish Parliament Acted to introduce free personal care for patients aged over 65 in Community Care and Health (Scotland) Act 2002. The Scottish Parliament abolished Primary Care Trusts in the National Health Service Reform (Scotland) Act 2004, which abolished the internal market in Scotland and replaced NHS Trusts with 15 territorial health boards. In 2004, GPs were no longer required to provide out of hours services unless they opted into doing so. In 2005, a plan for improving oral health and modernising dental practices was put into place, known as 'Childsmile', which provides preventive care such as proper brushing technique, tooth varnish and dietary advice. This has resulted in 60% of children in Scotland having no obvious signs of tooth decay.

An incentive programme for GPs was established in 2004, known as the Quality and Outcomes Framework (QOF) were introduced in order to reward and incentivize good practice and provided a way for GP surgeries to increase their income. This was abolished in Scotland in 2015 as QOF compliance was a significant administrative burden for GPs. The Scottish Government and the British Medical Association agreed the 2018 Scottish General Medical Services Contract that came in to force 1 April 2018. In 2008, the Scottish Government introduced the Scottish Patient Safety Programme, which aimed to reduced iatrogenic illness by changing the safety culture to be more in line with the aviation industry, by providing clinicians with skills in improvement methodology and root cause analysis.

In 2022 an extra £82.6 million was announced to bolster pharmacy support for repeat prescriptions and medication reviews in GP practices. The same year, NHS Scotland recruited 191 nurses from overseas. The nurses were recruited from several countries, including India and Philippines. A plan was made to hire another 203 foreign nurses through recruitment agencies. A contract was awarded to Inhealthcare for remote monitoring services across Scotland. This will enable patients to record relevant information at home and relay the readings to NHS teams for analysis using a mobile app or landline telephone. It will be used to manage hypertension, chronic obstructive pulmonary disease, asthma, heart disease, diabetes, depression, malnutrition, cancer and COVID.

There is a substantial effort to develop a drone delivery service. The University of Strathclyde, NHS Grampian, NATS Holdings, AGS Airports and other partners form a consortium, Care and Equity – Healthcare Logistics UAS Scotland known as 'CAELUS' which has designed drone landing stations for NHS sites across Scotland and developed a virtual model of the proposed delivery network. It is testing whether drones will improve logistics services, including the transport of laboratory samples, blood products, chemotherapy and medicines. It is hoped that this will provide equity of care between urban and remote rural communities. At present patients in remote areas may have to travel for hours to reach a hospital able to provide specialised treatment. Skyports, a drone operator, is running flight trials and live flights should start in 2023.

== Performance ==
In 2014 the Nuffield Trust and the Health Foundation produced a report comparing the performance of the NHS in the four countries of the UK since devolution in 1999. They included data for the North East of England as an area more similar to the devolved areas than the rest of England. They found that there was little evidence that any one country was moving ahead of the others consistently across the available indicators of performance. There had been improvements in all four countries in life expectancy and in rates of mortality amenable to health care. Despite the hotly contested policy differences between the four countries there was little evidence, where there was comparable data, of any significant differences in outcomes. The authors also complained about the increasingly limited set of comparable data on the four health systems of the UK.

In 2014–2015 more than 7,500 NHS patients were treated in private hospitals to meet waiting times targets.

Dr. Peter Bennie, of the British Medical Association, attacked the decision to release weekly reports on the Accident and Emergency 4-hour wait target in June 2015. In June 2015, 92.2% of patients were admitted or discharged within 4 hours against a target of 95%. He said, "The publication of these weekly statistics completely misses the point and diverts attention from the real issues in our health service."

The Academy of Medical Royal Colleges and Faculties in Scotland produced a report entitled "Learning from serious failings in care" in July 2015. The investigation was launched after concerns about high death rates and staffing problems at Monklands Hospital, a Clostridioides difficile outbreak at the Vale of Leven Hospital and concerns about patient safety and care at Aberdeen Royal Infirmary. The report found the problems had been predominantly caused by the failure of clinical staff and NHS management to work together. They found leadership and accountability were often lacking but bullying was endemic. Their 20 recommendations for improvements in the NHS included a set of minimum safe staffing levels for consultants, doctors, nurses and other staff in hospital settings. They criticised a target-driven culture, saying: "Quality care must become the primary influence on patient experience... and the primary indicator of performance."

In January 2017 the British Medical Association said that the health service in Scotland was "stretched pretty much to breaking point" and needed an increase in funding of at least 4% "just to stand still". The service missed seven out of eight performance targets in 2016–2017. There was a 99% increase in the number of people waiting more than 12 weeks for an outpatient appointment. Drug-related deaths were the highest in the European Union.

NHS Scotland's local health boards also have high vacancy levels in their mental health departments. In 2020, it was revealed that over 1 in 8 senior mental health roles were unfilled, which has directly led to increased waiting times for mental health patients.

In November 2022 a survey by Ipsos and the Health Foundation found just 28% of the Scottish public were confident about their devolved government plans for the NHS. This coincides with another 2022 study by Ipsos which found that 51% of the Scottish public believes that the Scottish Government has done a bad job improving the NHS since the 2021 elections, with only 22% believing it has done a good job.

== Anglo-Scottish Border ==
Although patients who live close to the Anglo-Scottish border are able to access services on the other side, cross-border administration is not always streamlined. The Coldstream medical practice has about 1400 patients who live in England. They benefit from the Scottish free prescriptions because they are "deemed to be in the Scottish healthcare system" so long as they are delivered through a Scottish pharmacy. However, there has been no agreement about the reimbursement of hospital charges for patients who cross the border for hospital treatment. In 2013, 633 Northumberland patients crossed into Scotland for treatment at the Borders General Hospital.

University College London Hospitals NHS Foundation Trust complained in June 2015 that commissioners outside England use a "burdensome" prior approval process, where a funding agreement is needed before each stage of treatment. At the end of 2014–15 the trust was owed more than £2.3m for treating patients from outside England. A survey by the Health Service Journal suggested there was £21m of outstanding debt relating to patients from the devolved nations treated in the last three years, against total invoicing of £315m by English NHS trusts. Funding was approved for 625 referrals outside Scotland in 2016–2017, up from 427 in 2013–2014. The cost rose from £11.9 million in 2013–2014 to £15.2 million in 2016–2017.

== Overseas patients ==
Patients who are not entitled to free NHS treatment because they are not ordinarily resident in the UK are supposed to pay for their treatment. Not all of this money is collected. £347,089 was owed to NHS Lothian by 28 patients in 2016–2017, compared with £47,755 owed by fewer than five patients the previous year. In Greater Glasgow and Clyde the number of overseas patients treated rose from 67 in 2014–2015 to 99. A total of £423,326 is owed to the health board and about £1.2 million across Scotland.

== See also ==
- NHS Research Scotland
- Social care in Scotland
- List of hospitals in Scotland
- Voluntary Health Scotland
- NHS Wales
- National Health Service (England)
- Health and Social Care (Northern Ireland)
