= Healthcare in Scotland =

Overview of the health care system in Scotland

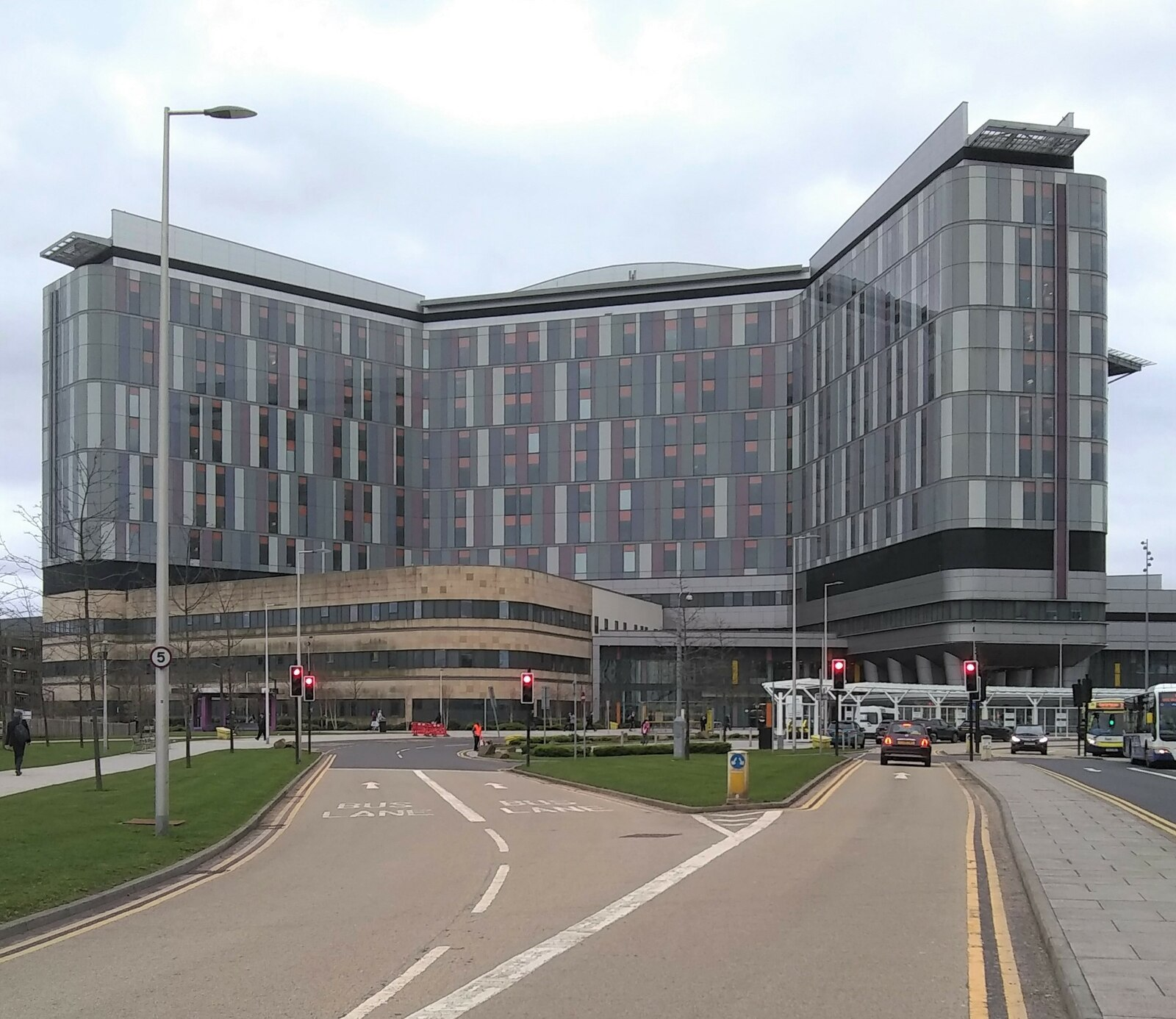
The Queen Elizabeth University Hospital, an NHS Scotland general hospital. It is the largest hospital campus in Europe

Healthcare in Scotland is mainly provided by Scotland's public health service, NHS Scotland. It provides healthcare to all permanent residents free at the point of need and paid for from general taxation. Health is a matter that is devolved, and considerable differences have developed between the public healthcare systems in the countries of the United Kingdom, collectively the National Health Service (NHS). Though the public system dominates healthcare provision, private healthcare and a wide variety of alternative and complementary treatments are available for those willing and able to pay.

== Health in Scotland ==
Overall, Scotland has a healthy population. The average life expectancy in 2013 was 79.1 years. However, because Scotland is a country with large rural expanses (i.e. 20% of the population lives across 94% of the land space), there are parts of the population that find it challenging to access some healthcare services. This problem is compounded by a disproportionate number of people aged 65 and older living in these rural areas. The elderly generally require more specialised and intensive forms of healthcare services, which may not always be able to be provided at the same level in remote rural areas as they are in Scotland's urban areas due to a lack of rural healthcare professionals.

== Healthcare services ==
=== Public provision ===
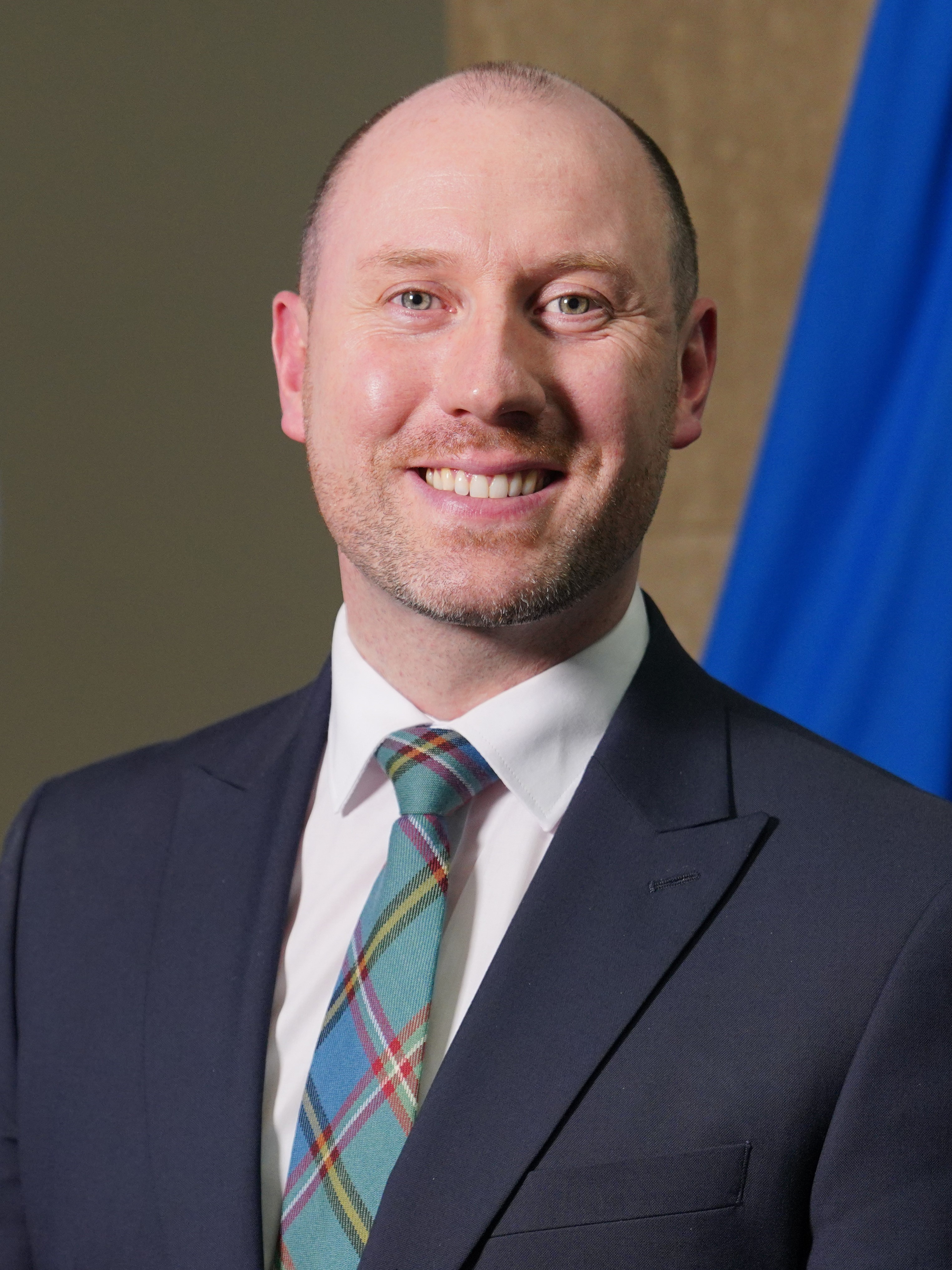
Neil Gray, the incumbent Cabinet Secretary for NHS Recovery, Health and Social Care within the Scottish Government

The National Health Service (NHS) in Scotland was created by the National Health Service (Scotland) Act 1947 in 1948 at the same time the NHS was created for England and Wales. Scotland's NHS remains a separate body from the other public health systems in the UK which can lead to confusion from patients when "cross-border" or emergency care is involved.

Primary and secondary care are integrated in Scotland. Unlike in England, NHS trusts do not exist in Scotland. Instead, healthcare is provided through fourteen regional health boards. These health boards are further subdivided into Health and Social Care Partnerships. The Scottish Ambulance Service is the pan-Scotland board responsible for prehospital care provision and transport of patients between the mainland and the Scottish Islands. The ambulance service is supported by the Emergency Medical Retrieval Service and BASICS Scotland.

Scotland spent over £12 billion on healthcare in 2015/16 which accounted for 40% of the Scottish Government's total budget. The NHS in Scotland consists of approximately 161,000 employees, 9.2% of whom are medical or dental doctors, 42.9% nurses and midwives, 18.2% administrative services, 3.9% healthcare scientists, and the remaining 25.8% in various other medical services. In the past several years, healthcare costs have been rising in Scotland. Despite this, Scots have a generally favorable view of their NHS service with 61% of the population either very or quite satisfied with the service.

Healthcare policy and funding is the responsibility of the Health Directorates. The current Cabinet Secretary for NHS Recovery, Health and Social Care is Neil Gray. The Director-General (DG) of Health and Social Care, Chief Executive of NHS Scotland is Caroline Lamb.

'NHS Near Me', a video consultation service, was first introduced in NHS Highland in 2018 and became widely used in general practice because of the impact of COVID-19 pandemic. It replaced an earlier service, Pharmacy Anywhere. In May 2020 it began to be used in community pharmacies. 87% of patients and 94% of clinicians thought video consultations should be an option in September 2020.

=== Private provision ===
Around 8.5% of people in Scotland are reckoned to have some form of voluntary private health insurance as of 2012. Private clinics carry out dental and other healthcare services, including non-surgical cosmetic interventions and fertility care.

The number of referrals to private companies by NHS Scotland increased from almost 13,000 in 2013/4 to more than 28,000 in 2014/5 at a cost of £37 million. The biggest increase was in MRI scans in Glasgow.

Nuffield Health runs a private hospital in Glasgow which is a major centre for in vitro fertilisation. It celebrated its 30th anniversary in 2015 with approximately 6,000 babies produced.

=== Quality monitoring ===
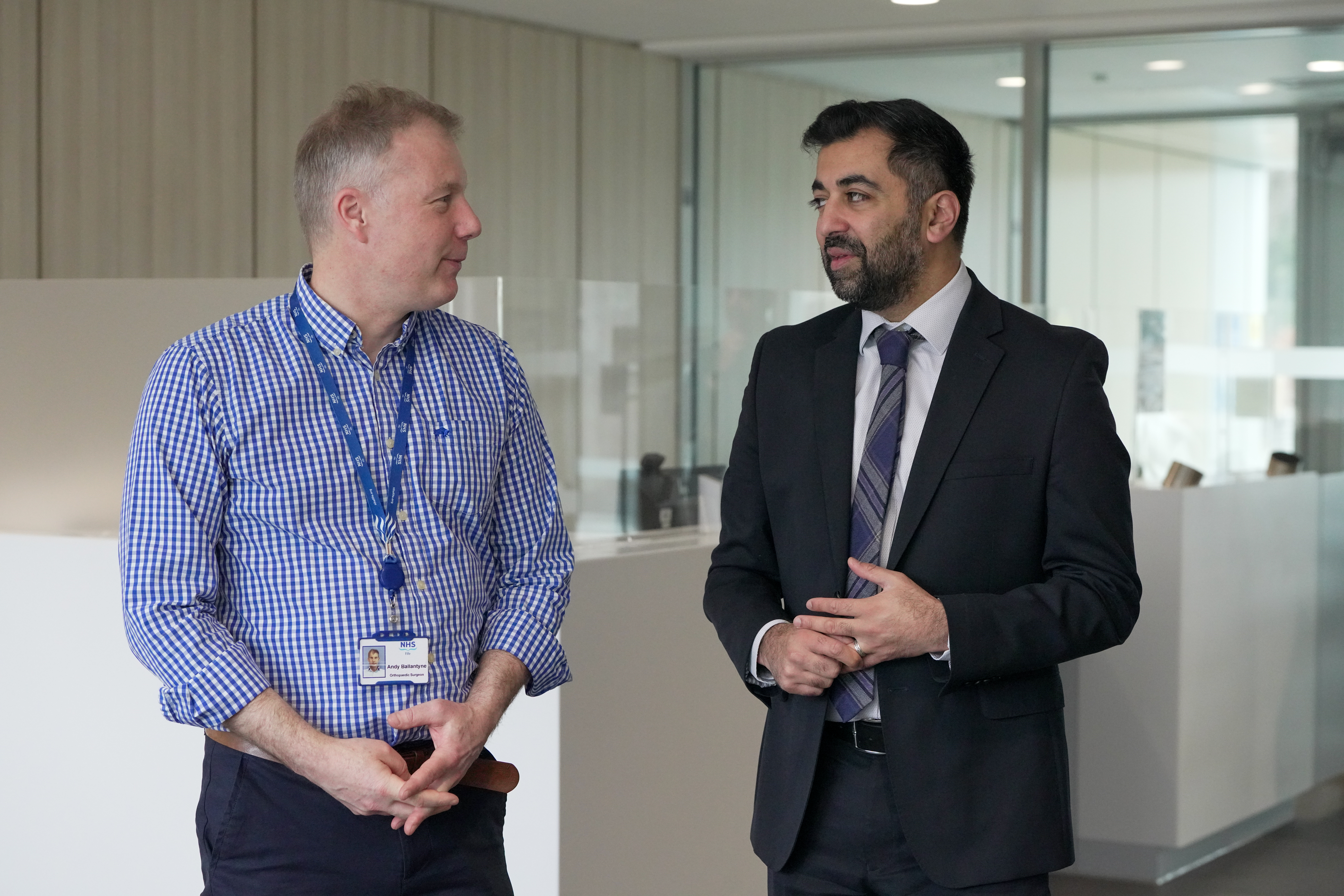
First Minister Humza Yousaf tours an NHS Scotland National Treatment Centre in Fife, 2024

Healthcare Improvement Scotland (HIS) is responsible for scrutiny of NHS hospitals and services, as well as independent healthcare services. Its function is to assess the quality of care in Scottish health facilities and to make recommendations for how to fix various issues.

However, HIS does not impose a formal accreditation system for NHS hospitals and clinics. The philosophy behind this is that setting minimum standards incentivises healthcare facilities to provide only the baseline level care. Formal accreditation can also be seen as burdensome bureaucratic intrusion by healthcare providers. Instead, HIS works in a more informal and collaborative approach with the NHS. This method of oversight differs from most other healthcare systems in the OECD who look to set clear and consistent standards.

The Scottish Government has sought to deflect criticism of performance in A&E by noting that - however bad things are - at least they are not as bad as England. There are 91 A&E services in total, including minor injury units, but statistics published by Public Health Scotland cover only the 30 larger A&Es. They are compared with England’s 170 Type 1 “major” A&Es, but many of the Scottish sites do not take major trauma. Monthly attendances are about 7000-8000 per Type 1 A&E in England against 3000-3,500 per ED in Scotland. If comparison is applied to all A&E services performance in England is slightly better.

=== Public health ===
Public Health Scotland, formed in April 2020, responds to infections diseases and environmental hazards, and supports national initiatives in areas such as mental well-being, inequality, and preventing harm from alcohol, tobacco and other drugs.

== See also ==
- Healthcare in the United Kingdom
- List of hospitals in Scotland
- Social care in Scotland
