= IRISS =

IRISS can refer to:

- Iriss, a Scottish charitable company
- IRIS², an EU satellite constellation project
- for the Iriss space mission, see Andreas Mogensen
