= Voluntary Health Scotland =

- Formation: 2000
- Type: Non-profit
- Headquarters: 18 York Place; EH1 3EP
- Location: Edinburgh, Scotland
- Chief Executive: Tejesh Mistry
- Website: www.vhscotland.org.uk

Voluntary Health Scotland (VHS) is the national voice, intermediary and network for voluntary health organisations in Scotland. It works with its members and others to address health inequalities and to create better health and well being for people and communities. VHS acts as a bridge between the third sector, decision makers and public services, in Healthcare in Scotland working to influence change in policy and practice. VHS activities include a monthly newsletter, seminars, round tables, conferences, learning exchanges, research and policy work. VHS is a non-profit making organisation governed by its Board of Trustees. It is a registered Scottish charity (number SC035482) and a company limited by guarantee(number SC267315).

Scotland's voluntary health sector includes:

Voluntary sector providers of health and social care services; voluntary organisations that carry out research, advocate and/or campaign on specific health issues, conditions and disabilities; community-led organisations that promote and support health improvement and healthy living at a local level; and volunteer-led and user-led support groups of people with shared health conditions and/or interests.

VHS full members include registered charities, voluntary and community organisations, and social enterprises. Its associate members are individuals that support the aims of the organisation.

== See also ==
- NHS Scotland
