= Older People for Older People =

- Mission statement: independent living · active communities · flexible services
- Commercial?: No
- Type of project: Community building
- Location: Scotland; Finland; Greenland; Northern Ireland; Sweden
- Owner: Northern Periphery Programme
- Established: 2008
- Funding: €2 125 530 (total); €1 183 997 (EU contribution)
- Website: www.o4os.eu

Older People for Older People (or O4O) was a project aimed to provide a greater degree of independence to the elderly whom were located in non-urban areas.

The project was a winner at the Regions for Economic Change Conference in 2012.

== History ==
With the intent to focus on what the elderly could provide for a community, and recognize their capabilities, the project investigated the means of using community building to facilitate the provision of services available to those people of old age. It used older people's skills to assist other older people, delaying the times at which they move out of their own homes. It was part-financed by the European Regional Development Fund through the Northern Periphery Programme and covered rural areas of Scotland, Finland, Greenland, Northern Ireland and Sweden. It ran from 2008 to 2013. At the end of the project, some services developed under it continued to be provided.

The project was supported by the University of the Highlands and Islands, the University of Aberdeen and the Highlands and Islands Enterprise. The project was shortlisted for the RegioStars awards in December 2011 and announced as winner at the Regions for Economic Change Conference in 2012.

== Outcomes ==
One project outcome was the development of a toolkit to help others create their own O4O projects. Some example outcomes which were developed are community transport, supported housing, self-sufficiency via a luncheon club using shared local produce, volunteering and schemes for friendship and helping.

== See also ==
- Social care in Scotland
- Healthcare in Finland
- Health and Social Care in Northern Ireland
- Healthcare in Sweden
