= Community Health Partnership =

Community Health Partnerships, known as CHPs (pronounced Chips) were subdivisions of Health Boards in Scotland, from 2005 to 2015, after which their functions were fully taken over by Health and Social Care Partnerships in April 2015.

CHPs had four roles within their locality:

- To deliver primary care services, including community mental health and sexual health services
- To work with social services to provide social care
- To promote health improvement
- To influence strategic planning, including the primary-secondary care interface

== History ==
In 2003 it was announced that CHPs would be set up as a means to devolve more power to frontline staff, and allow the NHS to work more effectively with other organisations, such as local authorities and the voluntary sector. At the time, this model was suggested as a way to better integrate health services with the council's social work department and some areas of children's services.

The National Health Service Reform (Scotland) Act 2004 provided for each health board to set up CHPs. The legislation was not prescriptive about how the CHPs should operate or how they should be structured. The first CHPs became operational in 2005 (with CHPs in Orkney and Western Isles being set up in 2006 and 2007 respectively). 41 CHP were initially set up.

On 1 April 2007, Edinburgh North and Edinburgh South merged to become Edinburgh Community Health Partnership. On 22 March 2011, the five Glasgow City CHPs officially merged into one, although it was administered as three sectors on account of its size: North East Sector; North West Sector and South Sector.

On 1 April 2012, NHS Highland's three CHPs- North, Mid & South-East Highland - merged into a single CHP that was co-terminus with the Council area, named Highland Health and Social Care Partnership.

Because CHPs were operating as committees or sub-committees of the area Board, decisions about their funding was devolved to the NHS Boards.

In June 2011 Audit Scotland produced a report on the performance of the CHPs. The review found there was limited evidence to show CHPs had brought about widespread sustained improvements in services.

== Boundaries ==
CHPs were typically co-terminous with council areas and represent a district or area within one of the 14 Scottish Health Board regions. However, this is not always strictly the case.

City of Glasgow, Fife, Highland each contained several CHPs.

The two Lanarkshire CHPs are co-terminous with the North and South Lanarkshire council boundaries and, as a result, incorporated some of the population from NHS Greater Glasgow and Clyde as well as the NHS Lanarkshire catchment area. The North Lanarkshire CHP included a population of approximately 16,500 from the Chryston, Moodiesburn, Muirhead and Stepps districts of NHS Greater Glasgow and Clyde.

The South Lanarkshire CHP included a population of approximately 55,000 from the Cambuslang and Rutherglen areas of NHS Greater Glasgow and Clyde.

== List of Community Health Partnerships ==
Note: In some areas, CHPs are known as Community Health and Care Partnerships (CHCPs).

- East Ayrshire CHP
- North Ayrshire CHP
- South Ayrshire CHP
- Scottish Borders CHCP
- Dumfries and Galloway CHP
- Dunfermline and West Fife CHP (Within Fife Council Area)
- Glenrothes and North East Fife CHP (Within Fife Council Area)
- Kirkcaldy and Levenmouth CHP (Within Fife Council Area)
- Clackmannanshire CHP
- Falkirk CHP
- Stirling CHP
- Aberdeen City CHP
- Aberdeenshire CHP
- Moray Community Health & Social Care Partnership (MCHSCP)
- East Dunbartonshire CHP
- East Renfrewshire CHCP
- Glasgow City CHP - North East Sector
- Glasgow City CHP - North West Sector
- Glasgow City CHP - South Sector
- Inverclyde CHP
- Renfrewshire CHP
- West Dunbartonshire CHP
- Argyll and Bute CHP
- Highland CHP - Mid Sector
- Highland CHP - North Sector
- Highland CHP - South East Sector
- North Lanarkshire CHP
- South Lanarkshire CHP
- East Lothian CHP
- Edinburgh CHP
- Midlothian CHP
- West Lothian CHCP
- Orkney CHP
- Shetland CHP
- Angus CHP
- Dundee CHP
- Perth and Kinross CHP
- Western Isles CHP
