= David John Porteous =

Scottish geneticist who worked at the University of Edinburgh

David John Porteous OBE
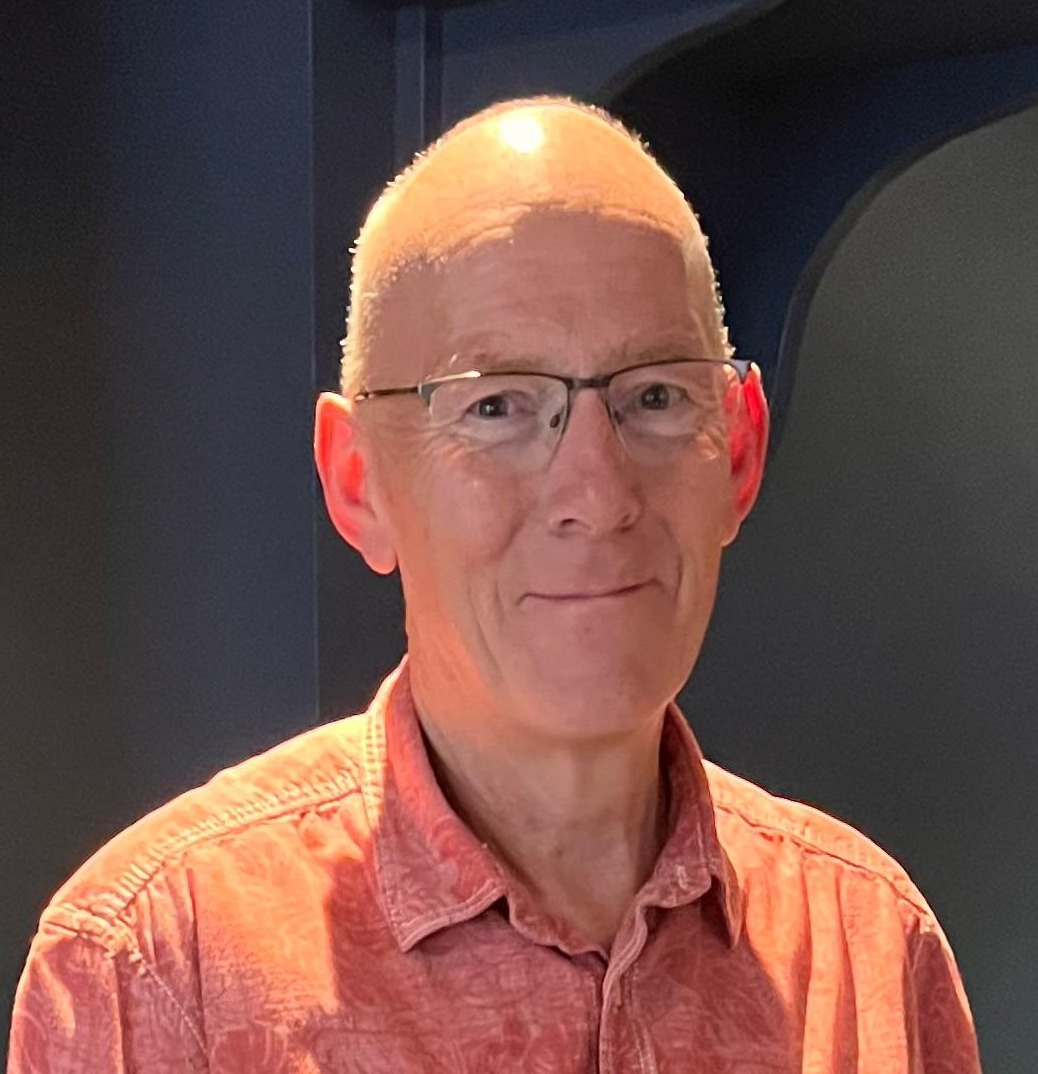
- Born: 3 July 1954 (age 72); Aberdeen
- Education: University of Edinburgh
- Known for: Research on Human Genetics, Gene Therapy, Psychiatric genetics, and Population genetics.
- Spouse: Rosie Braid (married 1976)
- Scientific career
- Fields: Human Genetics
- Workplaces: University of Edinburgh
- Doctoral advisor: Henrik Kacser

David John Porteous OBE (born 3 July 1954) is a Scottish geneticist known for work in the field of genetics. He is Professor Emeritus of Genetics at the University of Edinburgh.

== Education ==
Porteous attended the Aberdeen Grammar School before attending the University of Edinburgh as an undergraduate (1971–1975) specialising in genetics and a PhD (1975–1978) in metabolic control analysis (now known as systems biology), under the supervision of Dr Henrik Kacser.

== Professional life ==
Porteous has contributed to research projects in cystic fibrosis gene therapy and the first clinical trial of gene therapy in Scotland. In 2001, his group joined with researchers at Imperial College London and University of Oxford to form the UK Cystic Fibrosis Gene Therapy Consortium.

Porteous has contributed to research projects in psychiatric genetics. In collaboration with University of Edinburgh Professors of Psychiatry Douglas Blackwood and Andrew M. McIntosh, he identified genetic risk factors for major mental illness, most notably DISC1.

In 1999, Porteous initiated a population genetics research programme in Scotland called Generation Scotland, a family- and population-based study of genetic and environmental determinants of health and wellbeing.

Porteous was scientific advisor to the House of Commons of the United Kingdom Science, Innovation and Technology Select Committee (1999) that led to the establishment of the United Kingdom Human Genetics Commission (2001-2012).

== Awards ==
- 1999: elected Fellow of the Academy of Medical Sciences (United Kingdom)
- 2001: elected Fellow of the Royal Society of Edinburgh
- 2004: elected Honorary Fellow of the Royal College of Physicians of Edinburgh
- 2009: elected member of European Molecular Biology Organisation
- 2013: awarded an OBE for contributions to science

== Prizes ==
- 2004: Chancellor's Award for Research, University of Edinburgh
- 2015: Fondation IPSEN Neuronal Plasticity Prize
