= Health and Social Care Directorates =

Scottish government agency

The Health and Social Care Directorates are a group of directorates of the Scottish Government. They are responsible for NHS Scotland, as well as policies on the development and implementation of health and social care.

The Chief Executive of NHS Scotland and Director-General of the Scottish Government's Health and Social Care Directorates is Caroline Lamb.

There is a direct relationship between Ministers and the Directorates, but this relationship is not consistent across the Government as there is often no direct read across to Ministerial portfolios from DGs. The activities of these Directorates are under the purview of the Cabinet Secretary for Health and Social Care. He is assisted in this work by the Minister for Mental Wellbeing and Social Care, the Minister for Public Health and Women's Health and the Minister for Drugs and Alcohol Policy.

== Structure ==
The current Directorates are:

- Chief Medical Officer - Chief Medical Officer: Sir Gregor Smith
- Chief Nursing Officer - Chief Nursing Officer: Alex McMahon
- Chief Operating Officer, NHS Scotland Directorate - Director: Christine McLaughlin, Chief Operating Officer of NHS Scotland
- Digital Health and Care Directorate - Director: Stephen Gallagher
- Health and Social Care Finance, Digital and Governance Directorate - Director: Fiona Bennett
- Health Workforce Directorate - Director: Gillian Russell
- Healthcare Quality and Improvement Directorate - Director: Linda Pollock and National Clinical Director: Professor Jason Leitch
- Mental Health Directorate - Director: Stephen Gallagher
- People Appointments and Governance - Chief People Officer: Fiona Hogg
- Population Health Directorate - Co-Directors: Richard Foggo and Christine McLaughlin
- Primary Care Directorate - Director: Tim Mcdonnell
- Social Care and National Care Service Development - Director: Donna Bell

As well as responsibility for the regional health boards of NHS Scotland, the Directorates also have responsibility for:

- Public Health Scotland
- Mental Welfare Commission for Scotland
- Scottish Ambulance Service
- State Hospital
- NHS24
- Healthcare Improvement Scotland
- NHS National Services Scotland

There are seven chief professional officers:

- Chief Dental Officer – Tom Ferris
- Chief Health Professions Officer – Carolyn McDonald
- Chief Medical Officer – Dr Gregor Smith
- Chief Midwifery Officer - Justine Craig
- Chief Nursing Officer – Alex McMahon
- Chief Pharmaceutical Officer - Professor Alison Strath
- Chief Scientist (Health) – Professor Anna Dominiczak

== History ==
The Scottish Executive Health Department (SEHD) was created in 1999 from the former Scottish Office Health Department (SOHD) (previously part of the Scottish Office Home and Health Department). The separate departments in the Scottish Government were abolished in 2007 and replaced with Directorates. In December 2010, the functions of the Health Directorates were taken on by the Health and Social Care Directorates.

== See also ==
- Social care in Scotland
