= Children's hearing =

Part of the legal and welfare systems for children and young people in Scotland

A children's hearing is part of the legal and welfare systems in Scotland; it aims to combine justice and welfare for children and young people. As of 31 March 2020, 8,875 of Scotland's children were subject to a compulsory supervision order.

A children's hearing is carried out by three specially trained lay tribunal members of the children's panel, a children's reporter, child and legal guardian and a representative of the local social work department. The children's reporter takes no part in the decision making process of a children's hearing. A change to the role was introduced in September 2009 and the reporter is able to make representations if the panel is at risk of making a decision which is not, in the reporter's view, competent or procedurally correct. The reporter is responsible for the administration of the Hearing and also represents the decisions of hearings in a court setting when grounds of referral (now known as the statement of grounds) are disputed or the child or relevant person is unable to understand and comment on the statement of grounds (for example, due to the child's age).

As of 24 June 2013, Children's Hearings Scotland took over the running of thirty two local authority panels to have one national children's panel for Scotland with approximately 2,700 volunteers supported by 22 area support teams.

== Procedure ==
=== Selecting cases for hearings ===
Children referred to hearings are first referred to the Scottish Children's Reporter Administration. Uniquely in Scotland, referrals may be made on offence grounds and/or care and protection grounds. The children's reporter investigates the case (usually via information provided by the social work department) and will decide whether or not compulsory measures of supervision may be required. If, in the reporter's opinion, such measures are required, a Hearing will be arranged. The Reporter may take other steps short of arranging a hearing, for example arrange for some form of restorative justice.

In 2025/2026, 8,839 children were referred to the Children's Reporter, a decrease of 9.7% compared to 2024/2025. 25.7% of referrals received (3,898) were for children and young people subject to a Compulsory Supervision Order at the point of referral. 26% of children and young people referred had a Reporter decision to arrange a Hearing.

Any individual, under 16 years of age, or still subject to a compulsory supervision order (CSO), who offends is referred to a hearing unless the area procurator fiscal decides that the seriousness of the case merits prosecution in either a sheriff court or the High Court of Justiciary.

=== People involved with hearings ===
==== Duty to attend ====
- Panel Members

==== Right and Duty to attend ====
This group of people, unless excused by the panel, must attend every hearing to contribute to the proceedings of the hearing.

- Child
- Relevant Person (Relevant person is a person who is either the birth parent, unless these rights and responsibilities have been removed by a court; an individual with parental rights and responsibilities that has been appointed by a court order; or, an individual who has been deemed by a Children's Hearing where they have (or has recently had) a significant involvement in the upbringing of the child)

==== Right to attend ====
- Child Representative
- Relevant Person Representative
- Principal Reporter (or as delegated to a Children's Reporter, Trainee Reporter or Assistant Reporter)
- Safeguarder
- Member of the Administrative Justice and Tribunals Council or the Scottish Committee of that Council (acting in that person's capacity as such)
- Member of an Area Support Team (acting in that person's capacity as such)
- Representative of a newspaper or news agency
- Escort supporting Child / Relevant Person (for example a constable, prison officer, or other person)

==== Other persons ====
Finally are the group of people where attendance is not compulsory, however would assist the proceedings by giving information to the panel and aid discussion. The chairing person, however, has a responsibility to keep attendees down to a minimum. Other persons may include:

- Social workers
- Teachers
- Health Visitors

Some people may be excluded from the hearing if it would be in the benefit of the child/young person. If relevant persons, their representatives and/or (if necessary) the press are excluded, the "substance" of the discussion which took place needs to be discussed on their return.

=== Hearings ===
For the hearing itself, a child may automatically be entitled to legal assistance when specific circumstances apply. These are when:

- an application is made to the Sheriff for variation or recall of a child protection order
- a children's hearing is to be held on the second working day after a child protection order has been granted
- a children's hearing, or pre-hearing panel, considers that it may be necessary to make a compulsory supervision order including a secure accommodation authorisation
- a hearing is arranged after the child is detained in custody by the police.

In other circumstances, the child and/or relevant persons can apply for legal assistance via the Scottish Legal Aid Board (SLAB). Children's Legal Representatives are members of special panels maintained by SLAB, with all costs met by the Scottish Government. The hearing may also appoint an independent person known as a Safeguarder whose purpose is to prepare a report to assist the hearing in reaching a decision; the Safeguarder must act in the best interests of the child, which indeed is the basis of all decisions made by children's hearings. Each Children's Hearing must consider whether the child's immediate safety is assured. If this is not the case panel members have the power to issue an Interim Compulsory Supervision Order (when the child does not already subject to a Compulsory Supervision Order) or Interim Variation of a Compulsory Supervision Order (when the child already has a Compulsory Supervision Order but there is not enough information to make a substantive decision). This interim measure empowers the social work department to the move the child to "a place of safety" (e.g. Children's Residential Home, Foster Care, the care of relatives). Panel members also have the powers to issue a warrant when necessary to enforce the attendance of a child who has failed to attend his/her hearing.

== Section 67 Grounds ==
For a child to be required to attend a Children's Hearing, one or more Section 67 Ground must be relevant to the child. They include various care and offence related grounds. The grounds are that:

- (a): the child is likely to suffer unnecessarily, or the health or development of the child is likely to be seriously impaired, due to a lack of parental care
- (b): a schedule 1 offence has been committed in respect of the child
- (c): the child has, or is likely to have, a close connection with a person who has committed a schedule 1 offence
- (d): the child is, or is likely to become, a member of the same household as a child in respect of whom a schedule 1 offence has been committed
- (e): the child is being, or is likely to be, exposed to persons whose conduct is (or has been) such that it is likely that
  - (i) the child will be abused or harmed, or
  - (ii) the child's health, safety or development will be seriously adversely affected
- (f): the child has, or is likely to have, a close connection with a person who has carried out domestic abuse,
- (g): the child has, or is likely to have, a close connection with a person who has committed an offence under Part 1, 4 or 5 of the Sexual Offences (Scotland) Act 2009 (asp 9)
- (h): the child is being provided with accommodation by a local authority under section 25 of the 1995 Act and special measures are needed to support the child
- (i): a permanence order is in force in respect of the child and special measures are needed to support the child
- (j): the child has committed an offence
- (k): the child has misused alcohol
- (l): the child has misused a drug (whether or not a controlled drug)
- (m): the child's conduct has had, or is likely to have, a serious adverse effect on the health, safety or development of the child or another person
- (n): the child is beyond the control of a relevant person
- (o): the child has failed without reasonable excuse to attend regularly at school
- (p): the child
  - (i) is being, or is likely to be, subjected to physical, emotional or other pressure to enter into a marriage or civil partnership, or
  - (ii) is, or is likely to become, a member of the same household as such a child.
- (q): the child
  - (i) has been, is being or is likely to be forced into a marriage (that expression being construed in accordance with section 1 of the Forced Marriage etc. (Protection and Jurisdiction) (Scotland) Act 2011 (asp 15)) or,
  - (ii) is, or is likely to become, a member of the same household as such a child.

== Decisions ==
Following a grounds hearing, the panel may decide that compulsory measures of supervision are not required and discharge the referral.

However, if required, hearings have power to make a number of orders – these are:

- Compulsory supervision order (CSO)
- Interim compulsory supervision order (ICSO)
- Medical examination order
- Warrant to Secure Attendance.

When making either a CSO or ICSO, the hearing could attach a number of measures which may range from attendance on a particular programme, conditions regulating contact with parents or other significant adults/family members, contact with a social worker, placement in foster care, residential accommodation or secure accommodation. Once issued a CSO must be reviewed by a Hearing within 12 months. Relevant persons (as described above) and children can ask for this to be reviewed at any stage after 3 months. The social work department have powers to ask for the order to be reviewed though at any time.

== History ==
The children's hearings system was initiated by the Social Work (Scotland) Act 1968 (c. 49), and further reinforced by Children (Scotland) Act 1995 and Children's Hearings (Scotland) Act 2011. It followed a report in April 1964 of a committee set up by the Secretary of State for Scotland under the chairmanship of Lord Kilbrandon, a Senator of the College of Justice, to examine how young offenders were dealt with.

The existing juvenile courts were regarded as unsuitable because they had to combine the characteristics of a criminal court with those of a treatment agency. Separation of functions was recommended. The establishment of the grounds of referral (where disputed) was to remain with the courts but decisions on treatment were to be the responsibility of a new and unique kind of tribunal, which would be neither a court of law nor a local authority committee. On 15 April 1971, hearings took over from the courts most of the responsibility for persons under 16.

The Children's Hearings (Scotland) Act 2011 came into force on 24 June 2013 and brought a number of changes including updated grounds, updated legal orders, pre-hearing panels and the use of interim measures (instead of warrants).

== See also ==
- Social care in Scotland
- Scots law
- Sheriff Court
- High Court of Justiciary
- Crown Office
- Scottish Government
- Courts of Scotland
