= Social care in Scotland =

Social care in Scotland encompasses social work; care home services in the community for adults, children and young people; and services for young children, including nurseries and after-school care clubs.

== National Care Service ==
The National Care Service (Scotland) Bill was published in June 2022. It would allow Scottish Ministers to transfer social care responsibility from local authorities to a new, national service.

== Workforce ==
As of 2016 there are approximately 203,200 people employed within social services in the country.

== Older people ==
A community building project, Older People for Older People, resulted in a film being made in 2010 about how older people's skills were used in Ardersier to assist other older people.

== Criminal justice ==
There is no probation service in Scotland. The equivalent function is carried out by criminal justice social workers, who are part of local authorities' social work departments. Criminal justice social workers follow the same entry procedure as other social workers.

== Housing ==
The University of Stirling, Housing Options Scotland and Horizon Housing Association conducted a study of allocations and lettings practice for accessible and adapted social housing in 2018. They found that most of the 28 disabled home-seekers in their study received inappropriate housing offers, or no offers at all.

== See also ==
- Social care in the United Kingdom
- Social care in England
- Social care in Wales
- Care Inspectorate
- Children's hearing system
- Cornerstone Community Care
- Education in Scotland
- Health and Social Care Directorates
- Healthcare in Scotland
- Local government in Scotland
- NHS Scotland
- Quarriers
- Scotland's Commissioner for Children and Young People
- Scots law
- Scottish Children's Reporter Administration
- Scottish Social Services Council
