= Consumer Scotland =

Non-ministerial office of the Scottish Government

- Scottish Gaelic: Luchd-Cleachdaidh Alba
- Logo of Consumer Scotland

Agency overview
- Formed: 2022
- Type: Non-ministerial government department
- Jurisdiction: Scotland
- Headquarters: Thistle House, 91 Haymarket Terrace, Edinburgh
- Agency executives: Sam Ghibaldan, Chief Executive; David Wilson, Chair
- Website: consumer.scot

Consumer Scotland (Scottish Gaelic: Luchd-Cleachdaidh Alba) is a non-ministerial office of the Scottish Government. It was established in 2022 following the passage of the Consumer Scotland Act 2020 as the statutory independent voice for Scottish consumers. This act defines the general functions of the organisation:

- Reducing harm to consumers in Scotland
- Increasing confidence among consumers in Scotland in dealing with businesses that supply goods and services to consumers
- Increasing the extent to which consumer matters are taken into account by public authorities in Scotland
- Promoting sustainable consumption of natural resources, and other environmentally sustainable practices, in relation to the acquisition, use and disposal of goods by consumers in Scotland
- Otherwise advancing inclusion, fairness, prosperity and other aspects of wellbeing in Scotland.

Consumer Scotland does not provide direct advice to consumers; the office's role is to gather and use data and analysis to represent consumer interests to the Scottish Parliament, regulators, business and the public sector. It receives funding from the Scottish Government's annual budget, which is approved by the Scottish Parliament, and levy-funding for specific advocacy activity in the energy, heat networks, post and water industries.
