= Joyce Lishman =

Social work education and research leader (1947–2021)

- Born: May 1947; Castleford, West Yorkshire, England
- Died: 20 January 2021 (aged 73); Scotland
- Education: University of Oxford; University of Edinburgh; University of Aberdeen
- Occupations: social work education and research
- Employer: Robert Gordon University
- Awards: doctor honor causa The University of Edinburgh

Joyce Lishman (May 1947 – 20 January 2021) the first woman Professor at Robert Gordon University, was a leader in social work education and research.

== Education and career ==
Lishman was the first pupil from her girls' high school in Normanton to be admitted to the University of Oxford. She studied philosophy, politics and economics, graduating in 1968. She then went on to study social studies and social work at the University of Edinburgh graduating in 1970. She practiced as a social worker in child and family psychology. This experience she built on later in her career by developing a new social work service for children suffering from cancer or leukemia and their families, including bereavement care for the Malcolm Sargent Fund (now Young Lives vs Cancer or CLIC Sargent).

In 1985, she became a lecturer then senior lecturer at what was then the Robert Gordon Institute of Technology. In 1986, Lishman completed her PhD at the University of Aberdeen, with a study using videos to examine social work interviews.

When Lishman was appointed as professorial head of the school of applied sociology in 1993, she was the first female professor at Robert Gordon University (RGU), Aberdeen. She established the Scottish Institute for Residential Child Care (now CELCIS) in 2000, bringing together specialists from RGU, Strathclyde University and other bodies to improve training standards and practice in the third sector and also influence government policy for 'looked after' children.

Lishman was said to have 'influenced social work and social care practice across Scotland for decades', and for writing 'many iconic textbooks' known to thousands of students.

She retired from RGU in 2011.

== Publications ==
Lishman authored 26 books. These included a social work and social care handbook which over 25 years went to three editions (latest in 2015), and in 1994, another Communication in Social Work was one of the standard texts for social work practitioner education.

She edited a research series Research Highlights in Social Work which was said to have influenced social work in Scotland and across the world. She published twenty six books either alone or in collaboration, such as with Ian Shaw, on Evaluation and Social Work Practice. British Journal of Social Work noted the author's expertise and they recommended their book for graduate research students.'

== Other roles ==
Lishman also served on the board of charitable bodies: Lloyds TSB Foundation (now Corra), Aberlour Child Care Trust and VSA. She became the chair of the Partnership Drugs Initiative and a founding member of the philanthropic charity Inspiring Scotland in 2008.

She also chaired the heads of social work education group for Scotland and brought together standards for excellence in education in this field including the first interactive digital learning resources for social work in the world, now known as IRISS. In 2010, her School of Applied Social Sciences and the Business School at RGU together with a private leadership and organisational development company (The Taylor Clarke Partnership Ltd.) won a National Training Award for 'Collaboration & Partnership' developing social services leaders across Scotland.

For many years Lishman served on the Social Services Scotland Council, having been appointed in 2012 by the Scottish Minister for Education and Young People, for her experience in education and the third sector.

== Recognition ==
In 2018, Lishman was awarded an honorary degree from the University of Edinburgh,

== Personal life ==
Joyce Major was born in Castleford, Yorkshire to Kathleen Major (née Leicester), a French teacher and Stanley Major, a salesman. She met and married Roly Lishman who was a computing science PhD student at the time, whilst she was working in social work in Edinburgh. They moved to Aberdeen in 1977 and whilst working on her own PhD, they had two children Tamsin and Ben. When she died in 2021, she was also a grandmother to three grandchildren.
