= NHS Health Scotland =

Former Scottish public health system

NHS Health Scotland was the Scottish national health education and promotion agency from 2003 to 2020. A Special Health Board of NHS Scotland, its goal was to improve the health of the nation, via research, planning, programme implementation and evaluation.

NHS Health Scotland provided leadership and helped coordinate the work of other bodies, principally the 14 regional NHS Boards, in improving the health of the population and reducing health inequality.

NHS Health Scotland was established on 1 April 2003, by the merger of the Health Education Board for Scotland (HEBS) and the Public Health Institute of Scotland (PHIS). It was dissolved by the establishment of Public Health Scotland on 1 April 2020. It employed about 280 staff.

The work of the agency was focussed on:

1. child oral health
2. child healthy weight
3. alcohol brief interventions
4. suicide prevention
5. smoking cessation
6. cardiovascular health

NHS Health Scotland was dissolved and succeeded by Public Health Scotland on 1 April 2020. This new national Special Health Board is a collaborative approach by both the Scottish Government and COSLA to give effect to the recommendations of the 2015 Review of Public Health.

== See also ==
- Demographics of Scotland
