= Iriss =

Scottish charitable organization

Institute for Research and Innovation in Social Services (Iriss)
- Formerly: Scottish Institute for Excellence in Social Work Education (SIESWE)
- Company type: charity
- Founded: 2003
- Headquarters: Glasgow, Scotland
- Number of locations: 1
- Area served: Scotland
- Key people: Amanda Britain (Chairperson); Dee Fraser (Chief Executive Officer)
- Number of employees: 14 (2021)
- Website: www.iriss.org.uk

Iriss is a Scottish charitable company, based in Glasgow, Scotland which acts to make improvements to how the social services workforce in Scotland makes use of knowledge and research.

== History ==
In 2003, the Scottish Institute for Excellence in Social Work Education (SIESWE) was established as a sector-wide collaboration of the nine Scottish universities teaching social work, under the chair, Professor Joyce Lishman, of RGU with the objective of bringing about transformational change in the education and training of Scotland's future social workers

In 2007, SIESWE changed its name to Iriss which reflected an extension of the scope to include the social care workforce.

== Learning Exchange ==
In 2005, the Learning Exchange was launched as the world's first interactive library of digital learning resources for social work education. This repository is catalogued in accordance with international metadata standards and Learning object metadata, allowing interoperability with other systems. In particular the intention was that multimedia learning objects could be downloaded as IMS packages and uploaded into virtual learning environments in higher education institutions.

Originally the Learning Exchange was built on IntraLibrary software and access restricted to students and staff of the higher educational institutions in Scotland engaged in teaching social work. Access was password protected using the Athens Eduserve authentication system. Subsequently the Learning Exchange was added to the NHS Education for Scotland (NES) portfolio of content accessible via Athens Eduserve. This made Learning Exchange available to the higher education sector and the entire social services workforce.

In practice much of the content of the Learning Exchange did not require password protection, partly because in 2008 Iriss adopted a policy of releasing its own content using Creative Commons licensing. Password protection was therefore removed and a simple search interface OpenSearch created which queried the database by SRU.

In 2010, the Learning Exchange was rebuilt using Drupal, an open source content management system.

The ability to allow metadata harvesting by third parties means that Learning Exchange content is automatically searchable by Social Services Knowledge Scotland (SSKS), a portal to social service knowledge and information created by NHS Education for Scotland (NES) in partnership with Iriss, Scottish Social Services Learning Networks and the Social Care Institute for Excellence.

== Multimedia ==
In 2005 Iriss began creating web-based multimedia learning objects based on scenarios devised by social work educators, scripted, professional actors cast, and filmed by professional filmmakers. Examples include:

- Imagining the Future, a creative exploration looks at what will social care, support and community be like in Scotland 2025. This key piece of research was released in November 2014 and was met with favourable review.
- Children, Families and Child Protection focuses on the legal, ethical and practice issues emerging from a child protection case scenario.
- The Assessment Triangle was adopted within the development of the Integrated Assessment Framework of GIRFEC.
- The Golden Bridge documents the migration of Home Children from Scotland to Canada in the late 19th and early 20th century. It includes artefacts, such as photographs, from Quarriers organisation, a major voluntary sector childcare agency.

== Audio and Video ==
In 2006, Iriss began recording research seminars and other events as an effective and inexpensive way of capturing and sharing knowledge. These recordings were made available as a podcast either direct from the Iriss website or from the iTunes Store.

In June 2012 the podcast series was superseded by IRISS.FM internet radio.

Iriss also uses Vimeo, for video streaming.

== Knowledge Management Strategy ==
Iriss collaborated with NHS Education for Scotland (NES) and other stakeholders to create The Knowledge Management Strategy for the Social Services which was derived from Changing Lives.

The Knowledge Management Strategy for the Social Services was revised and new edition published by the Scottish Government in November 2012

As the ubiquity of the web has grown, new skills are required, known collectively as information literacy: ‘the ability to find, evaluate and use digital information effectively, efficiently and ethically'. In collaboration with NHS Education for Scotland Iriss developed a series of manuals aimed at helping social services practitioners develop their information literacy skills, as well as a simple interactive web-based introductory tutorial.

== Evidence informed practice ==
Iriss has developed a number of tools and services to promote and foster the use of evidence to inform practice. Confidence through Evidence is a toolkit designed to help practitioners acquire, assess, adapt and apply evidence in practice. A complementary library of evidence summaries was created within the Learning Exchange. A Champions Network has been established to foster links between Iriss and social services workforce in both the statutory and voluntary sectors.

The Research Advice Service was set up to support the social care workers carrying out their own research.

== Innovation and improvement ==
The Innovation and Improvement programme promotes new thinking for social services in Scotland. The programme develops tools, training and interventions that will support and enable the sustainable transformation of social services in Scotland.

== Technical barriers ==
In 2010, Iriss commissioned a report, "Social Media in the Social Services", which was published as an interactive document inviting comment and discussion. Iriss continues (partly though the Just Do It! blog) to urge public bodies to open up access to social media and trust professional staff to act responsibly.
