= Scottish Children's Reporter Administration =

Executive non-departmental public body of the Scottish Government

Agency overview
- Formed: 1996
- Type: Executive non-departmental public body
- Jurisdiction: Scotland
- Headquarters: Ochil House, Springkerse Business Park, Stirling
- Employees: 504
- Annual budget: £34m (2024-2025)
- Agency executives: Neil Hunter, Principal Reporter/ Chief Executive; Cathie Cowan, Chair
- Website: www.scra.gov.uk

The Scottish Children's Reporter Administration (SCRA) is an executive non-departmental public body of the Scottish Government, with responsibility for protecting children at risk. SCRA was formed under the Local Government (Scotland) Act 1994 and became fully operational on 1 April 1996, taking over responsibility for the existing system of Children's Reporters (see Children's Hearing).

SCRA's aim is to "provide a safety net for vulnerable children and deliver tailored solutions which meet the needs of the individuals involved, while helping to build stronger families and safer communities".

== Organisation ==
Although SCRA operates within a legislative remit, and at arm's length from government, it receives oversight and direction from its board. As a non-departmental public body, SCRA's board, although acting independently, is accountable to Scottish Ministers. Management oversight is achieved by a series of Committees. Complaints are usually dealt with by SCRA, but the public can also complain to the Scottish Public Services Ombudsman (SPSO).This will only happen after the SCRA complaints process has been exhausted.

== Referral mechanism ==
Referrals are made to SCRA about children who may be in need of legal intervention to help them address their needs and/or behaviour. The referral may be made on offence grounds and/or care and protection grounds. Most referrals are received from the police, social work departments or schools. However, parents, family members, carers or any concerned member of the public can also contact the Children's Reporter. These grounds are contained within statute namely, Section 67(2) of the Children's Hearings (Scotland) Act, 2011.

Each case is assigned to a Children's Reporter employed by SCRA. The Reporter investigates the case and decides whether or not compulsory measures of supervision may be required. If, in the Reporter's opinion, such measures are required, a Hearing will be arranged. The Reporter may take other steps short of arranging a Hearing, for example arrange for some form of restorative justice.

== Referral statistics ==
8,839 children were referred to the Children's Reporter in 2025/ 2026 and 74.4% of referrals came from the police. Referrals received in 2025/ 2026 decreased by 9.7% from 2024/ 2025.

== Role in the Children's Hearings System ==
SCRA's role within the Children's Hearings System is to provide suitable accommodation for Hearings, provide information to the hearing panel and to enable the children and families to participate in Hearings.

== See also ==
- Social care in Scotland
