= Information Services Division =

The Information Services Division (ISD) is the part of NHS Scotland that provides health information, health intelligence, statistical information and analysis. ISD is part of the Public Health and Intelligence Strategic Business Unit of Public Health Scotland.

== History ==
From January 2015, ISD has published health statistics weekly, spreading the publications out more evenly across the year.

In 2011 there were 3 main groups attending to core work:

- Healthcare Information Group - directed by Joan Forrest - analyses hospital, general practice, prescribing and other nationally consistent data;
- Epidemiology and Statistics Group - directed by Fiona Murphy - compiles national statistics on cancer and substance abuse;
- Data Intelligence Group - director Anne Leigh-Brown - ensures submission of current data streams and develops new ones.

There are also a number of specialist programmes. These include:

- Cancer information;
- Dental informatics;
- Equality and diversity information;
- Health and Social Care information;
- Heart disease and Stroke;
- Mental health;
- National Medicines utilisation unit;
- NHS Resources;
- Performance management (HEAT);
- Primary Care information;
- Quality improvement;
- Scottish Public health observatory;
- Substance misuse;
- Unscheduled care;
- Waiting Times;
- Workforce programme.

Two major internal change programmes are under way. The Scottish Health Information Service - headed by Steve Pavis - is establishing data warehousing and associated services. Delivering our Future - led by Lorna Jackson - is drawing-up a blueprint for the future of the organisation and catalysing staff and organisational development to realise that vision.

Information Services Division became part of Public Health Scotland on 1 April 2020. This new agency is a collaborative approach by both the Scottish Government and COSLA to give effect to the recommendations of the 2015 Public Health Review.
