= Health Protection Scotland =

Government agency in Glasgow, Scotland

Health Protection Scotland (HPS) was the organisation that co-ordinated health protection in Scotland until subsumed into Public Health Scotland.

HPS took over the functions of the Scottish Centre for Infection and Environmental Health (SCIEH) in November 2004. Other functions from National Services Scotland were also added.

HPS was succeeded by Public Health Scotland in April 2020. This new agency is a collaborative approach by both the Scottish Government and COSLA based on the Public Health Reform Programme.

== Activities ==
HPS provides advice, support and information to health professionals, national government, local government, and the general public. It is responsible for developing and maintaining a range of websites.

== Fit for Travel ==
HPS maintains "Fit for Travel", a website that provides travellers and their advisers with detailed information on health risks. The website offers general health advice, as well as specific advice on use of antimalarial tablets and vaccine recommendations. It includes a country by country index and specific information for different groups of travellers, such as backpackers, young children, pregnant women and the elderly, as well as those with medical conditions such as diabetes and asthma.

== See also ==
- List of national public health agencies
