= Chief Scientist Office =

The Chief Scientist Office is part of the Health and Wellbeing Directorate of the Scottish Government. The Chief Scientist (Health) is currently Professor Dame Anna Dominiczak.

== See also ==
- Health Science Scotland
