= NHS Research Scotland =

Geography
- Location: Scotland

Organisation
- Care system: NHS Scotland
- Type: Academic health science centre

History
- Founded: 2009

Links
- Website: https://www.nhsresearchscotland.org.uk/
- Lists: Hospitals in Scotland

NHS Research Scotland (NRS, formerly Health Science Scotland and Scottish Academic Health Science Collaboration), is a government agency that supports clinical and translational research in Scotland. NRS is a partnership between 4 of Scotland's medical schools (Edinburgh, Glasgow, Dundee and Aberdeen), the Scottish NHS Boards and the Chief Scientist Office. NRS brings together the most senior figures from across Government, academia and the NHS.
