= NHS Education for Scotland =

Government agency in Edinburgh, Scotland

- Type: National Health Service (NHS) Scotland Board
- Established: April 2002
- Disbanded: 31 March 2026
- Headquarters: Edinburgh
- Region served: Scotland
- Staff: Over 1,000
- Website: www.nes.scot.nhs.uk

NHS Education for Scotland (NES) was an education and training body and a national (special) health board within NHS Scotland.

NES was the national NHS health board with a responsibility to develop and deliver education and training for those people who work in NHS Scotland.

To enable it to fulfil its remit of promoting best practice in the education and lifelong learning of all NHS staff, NES had statutory functions.

NES had a Scotland-wide role in undergraduate, postgraduate and continuing professional development and maintained a local perspective through centres in Edinburgh, Glasgow, Dundee, Aberdeen and Inverness. It acknowledged the role of education in empowering society to support positive change and participation in health and care services.

NES also cooperated and collaborated with regulatory bodies and other organisations that were concerned with the development of the health and care workforce.

Across NHS Scotland, much of the learning that staff undertake is completed in the workplace.

NES maintained the Knowledge Network, a digital library service that allows NHS staff to search for and share information. The Knowledge Network also contains educational resources and was a further development of the NHS Scotland e-Library.

NES was a member of UKSG, an international association that aims to connect the information community and encourage the exchange of ideas on scholarly communication.

== History ==
NES was established in April 2002, bringing together three existing bodies - the Scottish Council for Postgraduate Medical and Dental Education, the Post Qualification Education Board for Pharmacists, and the National Board for Nursing, Midwifery and Health Visiting for Scotland.

Since it was formed in 2002, NES has adapted to many changes, working with partner stakeholders to support healthcare professionals and other workers across a range of organisations.

The NES workforce numbers jumped from around 600 people to just over 1000 people in August 2011 as a result of NES taking on the role as employer of GP trainees, when these trainees are on placements in general practice settings.

Given the expanding role of NES, preparations were made for the establishment of a new Social Care Directorate in March 2022.

== Public Services Delivery Scotland ==

Public Services Delivery Scotland (PSD Scotland), replaced NHS Education for Scotland (NES) and NHS National Services Scotland (NSS) on 1st April 2026.

The new organisation was developed to lead on workforce planning and development, service infrastructure and innovation, with a focus on digital transformation. All existing NES and NSS functions were absorbed into the new organisation, with any changes to operational procedures expected to occur after an initial 6 month embedding period.

== Working with other organisations ==
To develop the health and care workforce, NES has aimed to coordinate its efforts with the regulatory bodies and have developed formal arrangements with some organisations. Since 2006 it has had a memorandum of understanding (MoU) with the General Medical Council and in June 2014 they announced a MoU with the General Pharmaceutical Council. In February 2013 they updated an agreement with the Institute for Research and Innovation in Social Services (IRISS)
