= Health and Social Care Partnership =

Health and Social Care Partnerships, (HSCPs) are organisations formed to integrate services provided by Health Boards and Councils in Scotland. Each partnership is jointly run by the NHS and local authority. There are 31 HSCPs across Scotland. These are statutory bodies, which took over responsibilities from Community Health Partnerships. They are responsible for £8.5 billion of funding for local services.

== List of HSCPs ==
The Health and Social Care Partnerships are:

- Aberdeen City HSCP
- Aberdeenshire HSCP
- Angus HSCP
- Argyll and Bute HSCP
- City of Edinburgh HSCP
- Clackmannanshire and Stirling HSCP
- Dumfries and Galloway HSCP
- Dundee City HSCP
- East Ayrshire HSCP
- East Dunbartonshire HSCP
- East Lothian HSCP
- East Renfrewshire HSCP
- Falkirk HSCP
- Fife HSCP
- Glasgow City HSCP
- Highland HSCP
- Inverclyde HSCP
- Midlothian HSCP
- Moray HSCP
- North Ayrshire HSCP
- North Lanarkshire HSCP
- Orkney HSCP
- Perth and Kinross HSCP
- Renfrewshire HSCP
- Scottish Borders HSCP
- Shetland Islands HSCP
- South Ayrshire HSCP
- South Lanarkshire HSCP
- West Dunbartonshire HSCP
- West Lothian HSCP
- Western Isles (Comhairle nan Eilean Siar) HSCP

== Framework ==
The Public Bodies (Joint Working) (Scotland) Act 2014 provides the legislative framework for the integration of health and social care in Scotland.

Ahead of the legislation coming into effect, an Integrated Resource Framework (IRF) was developed and tested, with HSCP models tested in four localities: Highland; Lothian; Ayrshire and Arran; and Tayside.

Two models of integration were made available for health boards and local authorities to choose between:

- lead agency, where arrangements delegation between partners
- body corporate, also known as Integrated Joint Boards

The only area where a lead agency model was adopted was Highland, where the health and social care budgets have been merged since 2012.

The three HSCPs in East, North and South Ayrshire were the first to become fully functioning under the new legislation, with their Integration Joint Boards legally constituted on 2 April 2015.

When Scottish Government's plans to implement legislation for integrated HSCPs were publicised in 2012, it was reported that each HSCP would be able to improve elderly care by cutting delayed discharges, reducing unplanned admissions to hospital and increasing the number of older people who are cared for in their own home.

== Implementation of the HSCP Model ==
In December 2016 the Scottish Government set out its Health and Social Care Delivery Plan. In 2017 they published standards setting out what people should expect when using health, social care or social work services in Scotland. Audit Scotland published a report in November 2018 on progress to date which stated "There are examples of integrated health and social care services making a positive difference to people’s lives, but these tend to be local and small scale" and that "Integration Authorities, councils and NHS boards need to show a stronger commitment to collaborative working to achieve the real long term benefits of an integrated system." In 2019 Scottish Government's Ministerial Strategic Group for Health and Community Care published a progress review on how implementation was going. The latter accepted the recommendations in the Audit Scotland report of the previous year, and put forward 25 proposals of its own, each with an implementation period of less than 12 months, reflecting the members' "shared commitment to making integration work".
