= Anna Dominiczak =

Polish-born British medical researcher

Professor Dame Anna Dominiczak DBE FRCP FRSE FAHA FMedSci
- Born: Anna Felicja Penson; 26 August 1954 (age 72); Gdańsk, Poland
- Education: Gdańsk Medical University
- Known for: Cardiovascular medicine, Precision Medicine
- Scientific career
- Fields: physician, researcher, academic
- Workplaces: University of Glasgow

Dame Anna Felicja Dominiczak (born 26 August 1954) is a Polish-born British medical researcher, Regius Professor of Medicine - the first woman to hold this position, and the Chief Scientist (Health) for the Scottish Government. From 2010 to 2020, Dominiczak was the Vice-Principal and Head of the College of Medical, Veterinary and Life Sciences at the University of Glasgow, Scotland. She is an Honorary Consultant Physician and Endocrinologist for the NHS Greater Glasgow and Clyde Health Board, and Health Innovation Champion for the Medical Research Council. From 2013 to 2015, Dominiczak was president of the European Society of Hypertension. She is the current Editor-in-Chief of Precision Medicine, a new journal launched in July 2023.

Her research interests include hypertension, cardiovascular genomics and precision medicine. She has led major research programmes, has over 400 publications in peer-reviewed journals, and is recognised as being among the world's foremost cardiovascular scientists and clinical academics.

== Early life and education ==
Dominiczak was born in Gdańsk, Poland, and went on to study medicine at the Gdańsk Medical University, Poland, where she gained an MD Honours in 1978. Her parents, Joanna Muszkowska-Penson and Jakub Penson, both specialised in nephrology and internal medicine, and were also highly distinguished in the medical field. Joanna Muszkowska-Penson, Dominiczak's mother, was a concentration camp survivor, arrested due to her membership of the Union of Armed Struggle during World War II. Following her imprisonment, Penson went on to work in medicine until retirement in 1991, when she moved to Glasgow to live with her daughter.

== Career and research ==
She moved to Glasgow in 1982 and worked as a Junior House Officer at the Glasgow Royal Infirmary, and a Senior House Officer and Registrar at the Royal Alexandra Hospital, Paisley. In 1986, she gained Membership of the Royal College of Physicians UK.

In 1986, Dominiczak was appointed Medical Research Council (MRC) Clinician Scientist and Senior Registrar at the Western Infirmary, Glasgow, and between 1990 and 1991 was research fellow and associate professor at the University of Michigan on a British Heart Foundation Fellowship.

She returned to Glasgow in 1992 as clinical lecturer and honorary senior registrar at the Medical School of the University of Glasgow, and in 1993 became British Heart Foundation (BHF) Senior Research Fellow and senior lecturer.

In 1998, she was appointed to a British Heart Foundation Professorship of Cardiovascular Medicine, and in 2006, the British Heart Foundation and University of Glasgow jointly opened the BHF Glasgow Cardiovascular Research Centre. Prof. Dominiczak was appointed as the first director of the centre, a position she held until 2010. The centre aims to create a multidisciplinary research environment of internationally recognised cardiovascular research groups, and is connected to the University's Medical School and Glasgow Biomedical Research Centre. Between 2004 and 2008, she was editor-in-chief of Clinical Science and was editor-in-chief of Hypertension between 2012-2022.

Dominiczak has been described as "a bona fide trailblazer in cardiovascular science and medicine", and one of "the country's most eminent scientists". Since 2010, she has held the position of Regius Professor of Medicine at the University of Glasgow – the first woman to hold this post. In the same year, the University of Glasgow underwent a major restructure with four colleges replacing nine faculties. The largest of the four is the College of Medical, Veterinary and Life Sciences (MVLS). Prof Dominiczak was appointed as the first Head of MVLS and as a University Vice Principal in 2010, and held this role until 2020. Under her continued directorship, by the end of 2018, MVLS had 2300 staff, 6,000 students, £230 million turnover and £120 million research income annually.

Dominiczak was instrumental in fundraising in excess of £90m in order to bring university research facilities to the Queen Elizabeth University Hospital campus in Glasgow. She oversaw the development of key buildings, the Teaching and Learning Centre and the £32m Imaging Centre of Excellence (ICE), which is a hub for Precision Medicine innovation and the site of the UK's first 7Tesla MRI scanner in a clinical setting.

The University site at the Queen Elizabeth University Hospital is also home to a Clinical Research Facility and the 22,000sq feet Clinical Innovation Zone, which houses a range of Precision Medicine-focused companies and research initiatives. Dominiczak's vision to see Scotland leading the way in Precision Medicine innovation and delivery, has been key to the make-up and structure of these buildings and centres. Her vision, to follow a triple helix approach to collaboration, sees NHS, industry and academia brought together under one roof in order to work closely together to bring more efficient solutions to health problems for both patients and the NHS.

From 2013 to 2015, Dominiczak was president of the European Society of Hypertension and was instrumental in bringing the joint meeting of the International Society of Hypertension and the European Society of Hypertension to Glasgow in 2021, where it was held at the Scottish Exhibition Centre.

In 2018, Dominiczak co-hosted the first Precision Medicine Summit in Scotland, which was attended by the First Minister of Scotland Nicola Sturgeon. The summit brought together the country's foremost experts on Precision Medicine, from industry, NHS, politics and academia, in order to find a One Scotland approach to innovation in this emerging field. Later in 2018 she was named as one of the experts appointed to advise the Scottish Government through the Scottish Science Advisory Council (SSAC). Dominiczak took up her position on the expert panel, which supports the Chief Scientific Adviser for Scotland in her work with Scottish Ministers, in January 2019.

In 2019, Dominiczak was appointed as the Medical Research Council Heath Innovation Champion, a new senior role within the MRC that is intended to enable the organisation to work more effectively with commercial partners. She has also served extensively on national and international research committees and advisory boards, including those of the Academy of Medical Sciences, the Royal Society of Edinburgh and the Wellcome Trust. She has been a member of the British Heart Foundation Board of Trustees since 2014.

Dominiczak's major research interests continue to be hypertension, cardiovascular genomics and Precision Medicine, where she not only publishes extensively in top peer-reviewed journals, but also attracts large scale research funding for programmes and infrastructure, with a total funding value in excess of £100M since 2011. She also led a collaboration of four universities, four academic NHS Health Boards across Scotland, and two major industry partners to develop a public/private partnership focused on precision medicine, with a value in excess of £20M.

She has been invited to give over 100 international plenary lectures, including the Arthur Corcoran Award and Lecture of the American Heart Association [xi], the R.D. Wright Award and Lecture of the High Blood Pressure Research Council of Australia, the Bjorn Folkow Award and Lecture of the European Society of Hypertension, the William Harvey Outstanding Contribution to Science Award and Lecture, the Robert Tigerstedt Award and Lecture, and, in 2017, the Pickering Lecture of the British and Irish Hypertension Society.

In 2020, Dominiczak received the Hypertension Distinguished Achievement Award for the ASA.

In August 2020 after the successful establishment of the Glasgow Covid19 lighthouse lab at the Queen Elizabeth University Hospital, Dominiczak took up post with the UK Government to run and expand the operation of Covid19 testing, focusing on the laboratory network and on secondment from her post as Glasgow University.

In July 2022, Dominiczak took up post as the Scottish Government's Chief Scientist for Health, where she aims to ensure that "health research, development and innovation takes a central role in the modernisation of the NHS in Scotland".

The new journal Cambridge Prisms: Precision Medicine was launched in July 2023, with Dominiczak appointed as its Editor-in-Chief.

== Awards and honours ==
- Appointed Officer of the Order of the British Empire (OBE) in 2005
- Appointed Dame Commander of the Order of the British Empire (DBE) in the 2016 Birthday Honours for services to cardiovascular and medical science.
- Honorary Doctor of Science, awarded in 2018 from the University of Aberdeen
- Named Evening Times Scotswoman of the Year in 2006 for the part she played in bringing the £12 million British Heart Foundation Cardiovascular Research Centre to the University of Glasgow.
- Received The Lord Provost of Glasgow's Special Award for 2006 for her work in the battle to rid Scotland of its title of heart disease capital of Europe.
- Fellow, Royal College of Physicians
- Elected Fellow, Royal Society of Edinburgh in 2003, and its vice-president for Life Sciences from October 2012 to October 2014.
- Fellow, American Heart Association
- Fellow, Academy of Medical Sciences
- Fellow, European Society of Cardiology
- Fellow, Society of Biology
- Elected Member, Academia Europaea in 2022

== Personal life ==
Dominiczak married Professor Marek Dominiczak, a clinical biochemist, in 1976 with whom she has a son Peter Dominiczak. Her interests include modern literature and film.
