= Public Health Scotland =

National public health body for Scotland

Public Health Agency overview
- Formed: 1 April 2020
- Preceding Public Health Agency: NHS Health Scotland Health Protection Scotland Information Services Division
- Jurisdiction: Scotland
- Headquarters: Edinburgh, Scotland
- Employees: 1,258
- Annual budget: £47.9m (2020-21)
- Ministers responsible: Angela Constance, Cabinet Secretary for Health and Social Care; Cllr Stuart Currie, COSLA Health and Social Care Spokesperson
- Deputy Minister responsible: Jenni Minto MSP, Minister for Public Health and Women's Health
- Public Health Agency executive: Paul Johnston, Chief Executive
- Website: www.publichealthscotland.scot

Public Health Scotland (PHS; Scottish Gaelic: Slàinte Poblach na h-Alba) is the national public health body for Scotland. It is a Special NHS Health Board, and it is jointly accountable to the Convention of Scottish Local Authorities (COSLA) and the Scottish Government. Fully exercising its functions from 1 April 2020 as Scotland's leading national agency for improving and protecting the health and well-being of all of Scotland's people, it is jointly sponsored by COSLA and the Scottish Government, and collaborates with third sector organisations.

Its role is to increase healthy life expectancy and reduce premature mortality. Areas of focus are COVID-19, mental health and well-being, community and place, and poverty and children.

The board's first chief executive was Angela Leitch, formerly chief executive of East Lothian Council. Paul Johnston, formerly a Director General within the Scottish Government, took over the role in 2023.

== Origins ==
The board arose from a reorganisation of public health in Scotland, outlined in the 2015 Review of Public Health and further developed in the 2016 Health and Social Care Delivery Plan. Public Health Scotland came into existence on 7 December 2019 under the Public Health Scotland Order 2019 and then property, rights and liabilities were transferred to it on 1 April 2020.

A predecessor, Health Protection Scotland, continues to operate as part of Public Health Scotland. PHS also took over the functions of NHS Scotland's Information Services Division, providing statistics and data analysis.

== See also ==
- Health in the United Kingdom
- List of national public health agencies
- UK Health Security Agency
- Office for Health Improvement and Disparities
- Public Health Wales
- Public Health Agency (Northern Ireland)
