= Nursing home care in the United Kingdom =

In 2002, nursing homes in the United Kingdom were officially designated as care homes with nursing, and residential homes became known as care homes.

In the United Kingdom care homes and care homes with nursing are regulated by separate organisations in England, Scotland, Wales and Northern Ireland. To enter a care home, a candidate patient needs an assessment of needs and of their financial condition from their local council. The candidate may also have an assessment by a nurse, should the patient require nursing care.

A survey of 2,000 adults and 500 carers in March 2022 found that most respondents said reports of conditions in 2020 and 2021 had deterred them from moving a close relative into a care home. 55% believed elderly people deteriorated more quickly when moved into a home, and 70% thought care home admissions had a bad effect on residents mental health. It was predicted that demand for live-in care will almost double that for care home placements.

Nursing home care is largely for the older population. Although the over-65 population of the UK has grew 20.7% from 2015 to 2025 the supply of care home beds increased by only 2.9%. Knight Frank found there were about 480,000 beds in 2025 - 26.7 beds per 100 over 85-year-olds.

== History ==
=== The workhouse ===
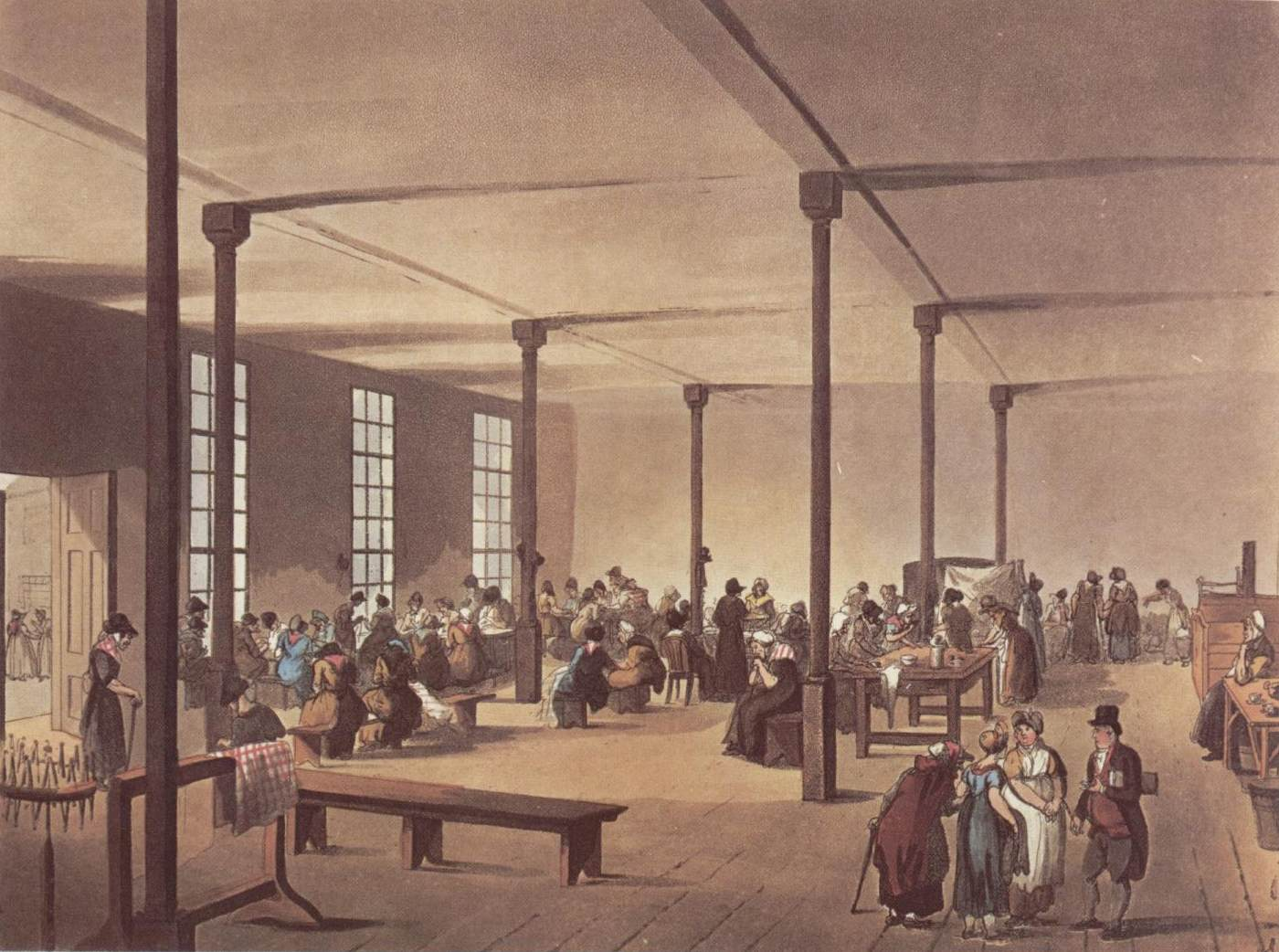
Workhouses were the first implemented national framework to provide a basic level of care to the old and infirm. Pictured, is "The workroom at St James's workhouse" from The Microcosm of London (1808).

The first government attempts at providing basic care for the elderly and the infirm took place at the dawn of the industrial era with the New Poor Law of 1834. Mass unemployment followed the end of the Napoleonic Wars in 1815 and the introduction of new technology to replace agricultural workers and the rise of factories in the urbanized towns meant that the established system of poor relief was unsustainable. The New Poor Law curbed the cost of poor relief, which had been spiralling throughout the previous decades, and led to the creation of workhouses for those who were unemployed. Most workers in the workhouse were set tasks such as breaking stones, bone crushing to produce fertilizer, or picking oakum using a large metal nail known as a spike.

Although conditions in the workhouse were intended to be harsh to act as a deterrent, in areas such as the provision of free medical care and education for children, inmates were advantaged over the general population. By the late 1840s most workhouses outside London and the larger provincial towns housed only "the incapable, elderly and sick". Responsibility for administration of the Poor Law passed to the Local Government Board in 1871, and the emphasis soon shifted from the workhouse as "a receptacle for the helpless poor" to its role in the care of the sick and elderly. By the end of the century only about 20 per cent admitted to workhouses were unemployed or destitute, but about 30 per cent of the population over 70 were in workhouses. The introduction of pensions for those over 70 in 1908 did not result in a reduction in the number of elderly housed in workhouses, but it reduced the number of those on outdoor relief by 25 per cent.

A Royal Commission of 1905 reported that workhouses were unsuited to deal with the different categories of resident they had traditionally housed, and recommended that specialised institutions for each class of pauper should be established in which they could be treated appropriately by properly-trained staff. The Local Government Act 1929 gave local authorities the power to take over workhouse infirmaries as municipal hospitals and elderly care homes, although outside London few did so.

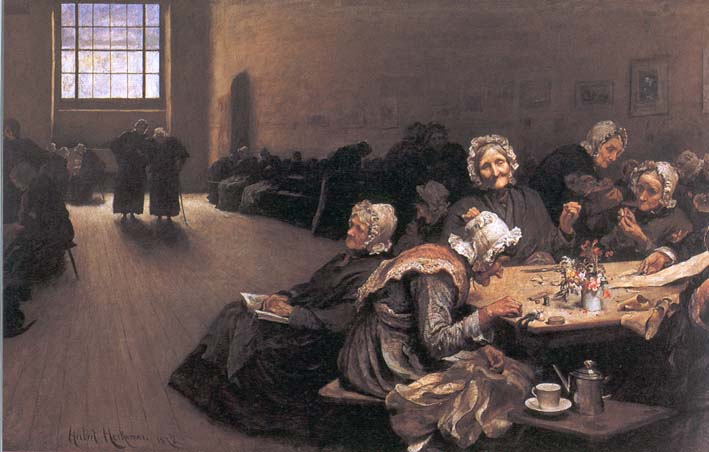
Eventide: A Scene in the Westminster Union (workhouse), 1878, by Sir Hubert von Herkomer

=== Public assistance institutions ===
Although the act formally abolished the workhouse system in 1930, many workhouses, renamed public assistance institutions, continued under the control of local county councils. It was not until the National Assistance Act 1948 (11 & 12 Geo. 6. c. 29) that the last vestiges of the Poor Law disappeared, and with them the workhouses. Many of the buildings were converted into old folks' homes run by local authorities; slightly more than 50 percent of local authority accommodation for the elderly was provided in former workhouses in 1960. Many workhouses were also converted into hospitals.

== Private nursing homes ==
Before 1914, those who could afford private nursing care were generally looked after in their own homes, but in the 1920s that began to change. In 1921, there were 25,981 patients in nursing and convalescent homes. In the 1931 census, there were 54,920. The standards of nursing care, however, were low.

In 1977, there were 1,249 Registered Private Hospitals and Nursing Homes in the UK with 34,546 beds. These figures include 117 private hospitals with facilities for surgery. There were at that time 116,564 people aged 65 or over in residential accommodation provided by or on behalf of local authorities, compared with 51,800 patients in NHS hospital departments of geriatric medicine.

In 2019, according to NHS England, there were about 17,000 nursing and residential care homes in England housing about 400,000 people. They were prescribed an average of seven medicines a day, and 14% of the residents were 85 or over.

Despite being over 5,500 care operators in the UK, there are five care home operators that own a significant share of the market. These five operators are HC-One, Four Seasons, Barchester Healthcare, Bupa and Care UK. Together they are known as the 'Big 5' and have over 58,000 beds in the UK combined.

=== Quality ===
In the 1950s and 1960s, the quality of nursing care steadily improved, with the mandatory introduction of central heating, single rooms and en-suite lavatories. In the 1980s, a significant shift from the public sector provision of care for the elderly to private sector homes occurred, with the proportion of private facilities increasing from just 18% in 1980 to 85% by the end of the twentieth century.

There is concern that fees paid to private care homes are insufficient to provide adequate quality care. Rises in fees paid by councils have not kept pace with rising costs of care. That led to falling standards, and many care homes are closing as a result. Professor Martin Green of 'Care England', urged the government to take "urgent action" and provide extra funding to councils and ring-fence that funding for social care. Green stated, "We have been warning about these problems for some time. There is a lot of churn in the sector. Contracts changing hands as providers leave and services stopping. There is simply not enough money in the system." There has been a steady increase in number of care home providers entering insolvency from 35 in 2012–13 to 47 in 2014–15.

Nursing home care can sometimes be seriously inadequate and cases of abuse and neglect regularly appear in the media.

== Means testing ==
The cost of a care home is means tested in England. As of April 2025, the lower capital limit is £14,250 in England, £21,500 in Scotland, £50,000 in Wales and £14,250 in Northern Ireland. At that level, all income from pensions, savings, benefits and other sources, except a "personal expenses allowance" (currently £24.90 per week), goes towards paying the care home fees. The local council pays the remaining contribution if the room occupied is not more expensive than the local council's normal rate. The upper capital limit is £23,250 and a person with capital above this level has to pay the full amount themselves.

The NHS has full responsibility for funding the whole placement if the resident meets the criteria for NHS continuing healthcare. That is identified by a multidisciplinary assessment process, as detailed on the Department of Health website.

== Regulation ==
Care homes for adults in England are regulated by Care Quality Commission, which replaced the Commission for Social Care Inspection, and each care home is inspected at least every three years. Care Inspectorate Wales, Social Care and Social Work Improvement Scotland otherwise known as the Care Inspectorate, and the Regulation and Quality Improvement Authority in Northern Ireland have responsibility for oversight in their respective countries.

There are complaints that some care homes react to legitimate complaints by barring people from seeing their relative in care.

In May 2010, the Coalition Government announced the formation of an independent commission on the funding of long-term care, which was due to report within 12 months on the financing of care for an ageing population. It delivered its recommendations on Monday 4 July 2011. The Care Quality Commission have themselves implemented a re-registration process, completed in October 2010, which will result in a new form of regulation being outlined in April 2011.

Inspection found some care homes were inadequate. In many private care homes, an investigation found that elderly residents soiling themselves because staff did not attend to them in time, residents with autism suffering inappropriate and disproportionate physical force, patients waiting excessively long after ringing bells because staff are under pressure, elderly residents not treated with respect with underwear exposed and faeces smeared on a cushion, patients put at risk of attack from other patients and medicines handled unsafely. In 2019, the London Fire Brigade published the findings of its inspections of 177 care homes and demanded the urgent review of their fire risk assessments, emergency plans and staff training. Most of the fire risk assessments was said to have been completed by in-house managers who did not understand basic fire safety principles.

== See also ==
- Care Quality Commission (previously known as Commission for Social Care Inspection)
- Eileen Chubb
- Home care in the United Kingdom
