= Lucy Johnston =

British journalist (born 1969)

- Born: 1969 (age 56–57)
- Occupation: Journalist
- Years active: Since 1992
- Employer: The Sunday Express
- Known for: Investigative journalism, part of the original editorial team of The Big Issue
- Awards: Genesis Award, 2001

Lucy Johnston (born 1969) is a British journalist, currently health editor of the Sunday Express, and previously a staff reporter and investigative journalist for The Observer.

Johnston was a member of the original editorial team of The Big Issue in 1992. She has become known for her investigative articles on London's drug culture, deaths in police custody, animal research, and the pharmaceutical industry, and for her campaigns to improve healthcare provision to the elderly and mentally ill.

== Education and career ==
Johnston was educated at Culford School in Bury St Edmunds. She moved to London in 1992 to work as a volunteer for The Big Issue, becoming a reporter with the newspaper's original editorial team, before working her way up to news editor, then assistant editor. She was known from then until 1996 for several investigative pieces, including on deaths in police custody and street drugs in London.

Tessa Swithinbank writes that Johnston was headhunted by The Observer in 1996 as a result of her ability to work with the kinds of sources few journalists were able to access. After several years with The Observer as a staff reporter, she joined the Sunday Express investigations team in 2001, later becoming health editor. She has conducted undercover investigations for the newspaper, including one in 2001 where she took a job as a care assistant in Lynde House, a nursing home owned by Westminster Health Care, which was headed by Chai Patel. Her story was highly critical of the treatment the elderly residents were receiving; Patel, at the time a government adviser on care of the elderly, later sold the company and resigned from his government post. She has also campaigned in the Express to highlight the treatment of people with mental-health problems, and has written articles opposing the requirement that pensioners pay for medical treatment while in nursing homes.

== Reception ==
Johnston won a commendation in 1998 from the Natali Prize for Journalism, awarded by the International Federation of Journalists, for "Barred from animals' kingdom," an article in The Observer on the conflict over land rights in northern Tanzania between the Maasai people and the establishment of the Mkomazi National Park, a conservation area for animals.

In 2001 she and a colleague, Jonathan Calvert, won a Genesis Award from the Humane Society of the United States for a Daily Express article, "Terrible despair of animals cut up in name of research," on xenotransplantation experiments conducted by Imutran and Huntingdon Life Sciences. Johnston was shortlisted that year for a "Journalist of the Year" award by Mind, the mental-health charity, and in 2012 the Sunday Express won Mind's "Making a difference award" for its "Crusade for Better Mental Health" campaign, with the work of Johnston and a colleague, Ted Jeory, highlighted in the citation.

An article by Johnston in the Sunday Express that was critical of the cervical cancer vaccine, Cervarix, was the subject of a complaint to the Press Complaints Commission in 2009. The newspaper published a correction and apology.

== Selected works ==
- "People dying in police custody," The Big Issue, No. 151, 9 October 1995.
- "Attacked, robbed, pelted, abused: Big Issue sellers run the gauntlet," The Observer, 3 January 1996.
- "Barred from animals' kingdom," The Observer, 6 April 1997.
- with John Sweeney et al. "'Spare the princes from Diana's fate'", The Observer, 7 September 1997.
- "Hanif and the Spurned Woman," The Observer, 10 May 1998.
- "Fruit growers face the final crunch", The Observer, 10 January 1999.
- with Jonathan Calvert. "Terrible despair of animals cut up in name of research," Daily Express, 21 September 2000 (archived).
- "Pet Food Cruelty Exposed," Sunday Express, 27 May 2001 (archived).
- "Secret evidence that could have saved Sally Clark", Sunday Express, 8 July 2007.
- "One person dying every hour from superbug", Sunday Express, 27 April 2008.
- "NHS whistleblower: 'Poor surgeons cause death'", Sunday Express, 21 June 2009.
- "Starving Britain", Sunday Express, 27 November 2011.

== See also ==
- 2001 Genesis Awards Winners
