= Southern Cross Healthcare =

Southern Cross Healthcare may refer to:

- Southern Cross Healthcare Group (New Zealand), a health insurance and hospital operator
- Southern Cross Healthcare (United Kingdom), a former operator of rest and care homes
