= Eileen Chubb =

British former care assistant

Eileen Chubb (born 1959) is a former care assistant in the UK who became a whistleblower and then a campaigner. She has shown a particular interest in the care home sector. She has led a campaign for new legislation named Edna's Law to replace the Public Interest Disclosure Act 1998 (PIDA) to improve legal protection for whistleblowers in the United Kingdom and for an inquiry into historic whistleblowing cases. She and other whistleblowers claim that PIDA has failed. Chubb has frequently stated her opposition to the proposed Office for the Whistleblower which has been recommended by Baroness Kramer and the All-Party Parliamentary Group on Whistleblowing.

== Career ==
Chubb left school aged sixteen and worked as a manager at a bakery chain. In her forties, she took a career change to begin working as a carer. In 1999, after working as a care worker for three years in Isard House care home run by BUPA in Bromley, she was one of seven who claimed they were forced to quit after reporting suspected abuse of elderly residents.

== Campaigning ==
Chubb has been critical of the ability of the Care Quality Commission to inspect care homes effectively. As a member of the public, she has visited over 300 care homes in the UK undercover. Chubb has alleged that the CQC disclosed the identity of 47 Whistle-blowers to their employers. She has reported on the CQC practice of allowing homes to re-register under new names after a poor inspection report, with the reports then being archived under the homes' previous names. Chubb claims this misleads the public.

In 2003 she founded the registered charity Compassion in Care. Erin Pizzey, Roger Graef and Auriol Waters are patrons of the charity.

In 2008 she published the book Beyond the Facade which described her experiences at Isard House and the BUPA Seven legal case.

In 2012 she co-founded Whistleblowers UK, also known as WBUK, with Gavin MacFadyen and Ian Foxley.

In 2013 Chubb resigned from Whistleblowers UK, followed by MacFadyen in 2014 and the company was dissolved in 2015.

In 2014 Chubb and Gavin MacFadyen co-founded The Whistler, a fellowship alliance between Compassion in Care and the Centre for Investigative Journalism (CIJ).

In February 2015, she gave an initial response to the Freedom to Speak Up Review report into NHS whistleblowing, produced by Sir Robert Francis, describing it as "a complete betrayal of whistleblowers”.

In 2015 Chubb was a speaker at the Stand Up For Truth tour with Daniel Ellsberg, Jesselyn Radack, Thomas A Drake, Norman Solomon, Coleen Rowley and Justin Schlosberg.

In 2017, following MacFadyen's death in 2016, Chubb announced an annual Gavin MacFadyen Award to be awarded to a journalist or publisher who had helped a whistleblower. Only whistleblowers can nominate, and Chubb presented the inaugural award to Private Eye, hosted by the Frontline Club at Byline Festival.

In 2019 Chubb became one of five finalists for the Inspirational Women Award.

In 2020 she published the book There Is No ME In Whistle-blower to set out her case for Edna's Law for whistleblower protection and how it would work.

In October 2020 Chubb was one of six nominees shortlisted for the GUE/NGL Award for ‘Journalists, Whistleblowers and Defenders of the Right to Information'

== Petitioning ==
In 2004 John Horam called Chubb and her six co-workers the BUPA Seven when he presented their petition to Parliament for a public inquiry.

In 2013 Charlotte Leslie presented a further petition from Chubb to Parliament.

Chubb has petitioned for her view of legislation changes, naming these Edna's Law, in honour of a care home resident Edna who died after cruel abuse:

- Criminal offence not to act on the genuine concerns of a whistleblower
- Deterrent because of strong case law precedents.
- Whistleblower would be protected witness.
- Compensate for loss of trust and loss of employment.
- Criminal offence to harm a genuine whistleblower.
- Wrongdoing is public and is acted on.
- State would prosecute and uphold the public interest.
- Bad companies held to account which results in culture change.
- Put victims of silence first and protect protectors.

== Whistleblowing reports by Chubb ==
Chubb has published reports on many aspects of the care industry, on whistleblowing legislation for all sectors and on related topics.

- Breaking the Silence - Part One - Evidence from 1500 Whistleblowers
- Breaking the Silence - Part Two - The Forgotten Victims of PIDAs failures
- Breaking the Silence - Part Three - Health Hazards
- https://compassionincare.com/public-interest-enemy-no-1
- https://compassionincare.com/hunt-justice-and-accountability
- https://compassionincare.com/should-we-abolish-accountability
- https://compassionincare.com/reality-cctv-check-0

== See also ==
- Southern Cross Healthcare (United Kingdom)
