= Steve Hindi =

American animal rights activist and businessman

Steven Omar Hindi (born c. 1953/1954) is an American animal rights activist and businessman. He is the founder and president of the animal rights organization Showing Animals Respect and Kindness (SHARK).

Born in St. Paul, Minnesota, Hindi grew up in a hunting and fishing culture. In 1985, he caught a 230-pound Mako shark in a feat that received a writeup in the New York Daily News. He ceased hunting and fishing after witnessing a live pigeon shoot in Pennsylvania on Labor Day, September 4, 1989. Shocked and disgusted by the sight of thousands of pigeons getting shot after flying from boxes, Hindi vowed to give up his hunting hobby and fight against it instead.

Hindi founded the Fox Valley Animal Protectors, which evolved into the Chicago Animal Rights Coalition (CHARC) in 1993 and is currently called Showing Animals Respect and Kindness (SHARK), to document animal abuse and disseminate information. Hindi's animal rights activism with the organization has involved lobbying legislators to pass laws against animal cruelty and documenting and protesting against rodeos, live pigeon shoots, geese shoots, bullfighting, horse slaughter, and deer killing. He posts video footage of animal abuse on SHARK's YouTube channel.

Hindi served a stint as shipping and receiving clerk at Carol Stream, Illinois-based Allied Rivet (then called Allied Tubular Rivet), a company that manufactures tubular rivets, before purchasing the company in the mid-1980s, becoming its president, and moving it to Geneva, Illinois. In 1992, he ran unsuccessfully in the Republican primary for a seat in the Illinois General Assembly against Tom Cross.

== Personal life ==
Born c. 1953/1954 in St. Paul, Minnesota, Steve Hindi grew up in a St. Paul housing project with his mother, Esther, and younger brother, Gregory ("Greg"). While he was a young child, his father deserted the family. His mother took care of him and his brother with the help of welfare. They initially lived in the slums and later moved to the housing project Roosevelt Homes, located at the east of St. Paul. When he was bullied by another boy in junior high, Hindi fought back and discovered that "often when you stand up to a bully he backs down". Hindi said, "But then I became a bit of a bully myself." He lived in several foster homes and had brushes with the law as a teenager, committing petty theft and getting sent to a youth detention center.

Upon graduating from high school, Hindi served as a bus driver for United Cerebral Palsy of Minnesota. He later became an aide at St. Paul's Union Gospel Mission. When he was in his early 20s, he traveled to Chicago around 1978, to become a rock musician. Hindi was the guitarist and was frequently the singer in a group that played at clubs near and in Chicago. According to The Morning Call's Susan Todd, Hindi led a "down-and-out life as a struggling rock musician". Hindi told the Chicago Reader in 1993, "I got the nagging feeling that this wasn't going to work out as I had planned" and decided to change careers to work as a shipping and receiving clerk at Allied Rivet.

In 1995, he resided in Kendall County, Illinois, with Jacquelyn ("Jacquie"), his wife, and his two daughters, Meghan and Eva. The family had five dogs and seven cats. Hindi and Jacquie met in 1979 and around 1999 had an amicable divorce, continuing to be friends and business partners. Hindi's animal rights activism caused his marriage to end. His repeated traveling and imprisonment turned away his wife, who said in a 2004 interview with the Daily Herald, "It was the downfall of our marriage. I was just thinking 'I'm raising these kids alone' and 'I'm out.'" She said that after they separated, she grew closer to Christianity. She forgave him and backed his purpose, saying in 2004, "A lot of people will say animal activists don't care about humans, but that is not the case with Steve. He just feels this is where his calling is and this is where his drive is. He's a great person and a great father, too." Jacquie died on May 27, 2014, at the age of 56. (Note: Jacquelyn "Jacquie" Joy Hindi was born on April 3, 1958, in Evergreen Park, Illinois, to Richard and Theresa (née Ewert) Simmons. She attended Grace Community Church. Jacquie died on May 27, 2014, in Sugar Grove, Illinois, and was survived by her two sisters, Pam Hendricks and Jeanne Hendricks, and her two daughters, Meghan Hindi-Anfang and Eva Hindi.)

Hindi has a black belt in karate and a pilot's license. Hindi said in a 1994 interview with the Chicago Tribune that he supports the People for the Ethical Treatment of Animals (PETA).

In 2001, Hindi lived in Kane County, Illinois. He stored hundreds of videotapes of animals in a "floor-to-ceiling cabinet" in his living room, assigning them titles like "Rodeo Cruelty", "Making Foie Gras", and "Pennsylvania Pigeon Shoot". Some of the videos were shot at bullfights, circuses, and roadside zoos. Shelves held small cameras, stun guns, and walkie-talkies. In 2012, Hindi lived in Elburn, Kane County, Illinois. Hindi's girlfriend, Janet Enoch, is a member of SHARK. In a 2014 interview with The Oklahoman, Hindi characterized himself as a lifelong Republican.

== Allied Rivet ==
Instead of attending college, at age 23 Hindi switched to being a shipping and receiving clerk at Carol Stream, Illinois-based Allied Tubular Rivet (later renamed to Allied Rivet), a company that manufactures tubular rivets. The company made millions of rivets for air ducts, toys and other products. He became the operator of the company's manufacturing shop. His father-in-law bought the company in 1982 and sold it to Hindi about five years later. After paying $240,000 to buy the company, Hindi became its president.

After reading a newspaper series about the homeless in April 1990, Hindi employed several homeless people at the company; the project was unsuccessful. In the early 1990s, he moved Allied Rivet to Geneva. In 1993, Allied Rivet had $2 million in annual sales and employed around 20 people, including his brother Greg, a "supersalesman", Hindi said. In 2007, Hindi's former wife Jacquie said that Hindi transformed their company Allied Rivet into a "very successful, multimillion-dollar company".

== 1992 political campaign ==
Hindi ran a campaign in the Republican primary against Assistant Kendall County States Attorney Tom Cross for representing Kendall County in the 84th district of the Illinois House of Representatives. His campaign platform called for school vouchers and "responsible" economic development that focused on "good jobs" rather than "a zillion jobs".

Hindi said about a challenge to his campaign, "The farmers, being hunters, hit me up real good on animal issues." Fatal to his campaign was that he was self-funded and was not supported by an organization. Hindi "lost badly" in the primary.

== Hunting and fishing ==
Raised in a culture filled with hunting and fishing. Hindi said, "My mother brought me up to be kind to animals and to care for them, but I didn't make the connection between abuse and hunting until years later." His mother taught him to nurture cats and dogs, taking in abandoned pets even though this violated housing project policies. Fish, on the other hand, were not considered sentient beings, so Hindi "killed them with abandon". In addition to striking carps with rocks, Hindi as a child once placed an M-80 firecracker into a strangling carp's gills, lit the waterproof fuse, and placed it back in water. Hindi wrote in an Animal People piece, "Seconds later the water erupted in a red spray. When the muddy water cleared, we saw the carp's head, blasted away from his body."

Having read the book Sport Fishing for Sharks and watched the movie Jaws, Hindi drove from Illinois to Long Island Sound, New York, planning to catch a shark. Hindi received coverage from the New York Daily News after catching a seven-foot-long, 230-pound Mako shark in 1985. After wrestling the shark for five hours to move it within shooting distance of his bass boat, Hindi shot its head with a .357 Magnum. By the time he defeated the shark, there were 32 shell casings on the boat's floor.

Owing to the shark's heavy weight, Hindi was unable to pull it onto his boat so instead fastened a rope around its tail and headed back to shore. But towing the heavy shark was more fit for a 30-foot boat than Hindi's 17-foot one. He discovered that his boat was not moving much after throwing a shred of Styrofoam into the water which turned from even to ripply. Unable to get a freighter to stop and help him, he refused to let go of the shark. Hindi reasoned, "I'd taken the shark's life. I couldn't let it go. And nobody in the world will believe it if I cut it loose." Two people in a sailboat saw Hindi and asked the United States Coast Guard to help him. The Coast Guard captain asked Hindi to get rid of the shark but Hindi declined. The captain sent a deputy to help Hindi move the shark onto the Coast Guard ship.

Inspired by Jaws, he set a great white shark as his next target, purchasing a 23-foot boat, but changed his mind after witnessing an event that turned him towards animal rights activism. In a 2004 interview with Garrett Odower of the Daily Herald, Hindi called his struggles with the shark "misguided".

== Fred Coleman Memorial Shoot ==
Hindi hunted until Labor Day, September 4, 1989. He was coming home from shark fishing on the East Coast when he witnessed the Fred Coleman Memorial Shoot, a live pigeon shoot in Hegins, Pennsylvania, that happened yearly. (Note: The Fred Coleman Memorial Shoot began in 1934. In 1985, animal rights activists began attending the Hegins, Pennsylvania, pigeon shoot, which occurred every Labor Day. About 8,000 pigeons are killed at the shoot. Because Labor Day is typically a slow news weekend, newspapers and television stations would send journalists and photographers to document the animal rights demonstration. With the increase in media attention, counter-protestors would congregate to berate and annoy the animal rights demonstrators. In 1996, a member of Funds for Animals videotaped the shoot to document animal abuse. A counter-demonstrator, who may have just been an inebriated person, decapitated a live pigeon by biting its head off in front of the camera. He was arrested and convicted from the videotape.) He decided to attend the event after hearing about it three years prior from the group Animal Rights Mobilization (ARM). The sight of 7,000 to 8,000 pigeons being "shot right out of a box" convinced Hindi no longer to hunt.

In August 1990, Hindi challenged Robert Tobash, a Fred Coleman Memorial Shoot organizer and businessman, to a fistfight that would end when either of the men could not continue fighting. If Tobash won, Hindi would donate $10,000 to the Hegins Park Association. If Hindi won, the shoot would be discontinued and Tobash would donate $10,000 to the park. Tobash declined to respond to Hindi's fistfight proposal, telling the Standard-Speaker that Hindi's "challenge is crazy in the first place. He can't call the shoot off and neither can I, because neither one of us has control of it." Tobash said that the pigeon shoot was organized by a 200-person group, the Hegins Labor Day Committee.

On Labor Day in 1990, Hindi and his brother Gregory protested at the Fred Coleman Memorial Shoot and were both arrested. Hindi said he kicked in the window of a driver who was trying to run into demonstrators at the pigeon shoot and was arrested. Hindi said in a 2007 interview with The State Journal-Register that the driver hit him, causing him to spring onto the car's hood. When he stayed on the hood, the driver increased speed and slammed onto the brakes in an attempt to knock Hindi off the car. Hindi remained on the hood and kicked the glass, shattering it. The driver continued driving for a couple hundred feet while Hindi was still on the hood. Hindi said he wriggled under another car to protect himself from the enraged observers and was saved by state police. Local officials disagreed with Hindi's side of the story, saying that while the car was passing through a throng of protesters, Hindi leaped onto the car and kicked in the windshield. The Schuylkill County District Attorney charged with him disorderly conduct and criminal mischief on September 20, 1990, for causing $1,100 of damage to the car whose windshield he had shattered. Hindi's brother, Gregory, who lived in Wichita, Kansas, received a disorderly conduct charge because police accused of him obstructing a mounted police officer by stretching out in the middle of the path.

In 1992, after the Ku Klux Klan said they would attend the pigeon shoot to demonstrate their approval of freedom and the right to keep and bear arms, Hindi published a press release saying he started the "Black Berets" group. Hindi said that because law enforcement in past years had refused to guard the activists from harm, the activists would supply their own protection. Martial arts experts would wear black berets; hence, they would be called "Black Berets". Local officials predicted that attending the pigeon shoot would be more than a hundred Black Berets, whose "any attempts at intimidation or violence" would be dealt with. In actuality, Hindi said "it was a wonderful scam", "it was never anything more than a joke on the shoot supporters", and only a dozen people with black berets attended. The pigeon shoot began every year with a prayer breakfast during which an ordained minister would pray and the national anthem would be sung. Prior to the breakfast's planned start time, the Black Berets took their vegan breakfast to the picnic location. After community members showed up, they observed the Black Berets praying for "the deliverance of the pigeons from the evil clutches of those whose hearts are hardened against them". Neglecting to eat breakfast or pray, the community members immediately exited the picnic area. Hindi told author Norm Phelps on August 17, 2006, "They were there to take the lives of the pigeons, and we were there to take the fun out of killing."

Pigeon shoot facilitators cancelled the event in 1999 after a July 1999 decision by the Pennsylvania Supreme Court. The Court did not explicitly illegalize the event, instead ruling that Society for the Prevention of Cruelty to Animals humane officers were permitted to arrest people who abused the pigeons before or after the pigeons got shot. In his majority opinion, Chief Justice John P. Flaherty Jr. called the pigeon shoot "cruel and moronic".

== Early animal rights activism ==
Upon observing the pigeon shoot, Hindi refused to wear leather. He gave his shark boat to a conservation association. After his wife, Jacquie, said she saw at a veterinary clinic an undernourished calf that had been saved from an auction in a barn, Hindi did some research and converted to vegetarianism. Upon ceasing to hunt, Hindi stopped fishing because he said he realized "the fight the fish was giving me on the other end of the line was actually its death throes".

In 1990, Hindi made a phone call to Animals Agenda (a now inoperative publication). He told editor Merritt Clifton, who later edited Animal People, his hope of preserving hunting as a sport by "doing away with unsportsmanlike practices" such as the pigeon shoot he observed. Save for the intimate friends he recruited to the undertaking, fellow hunters refused to side with him. Because he believed in ethical hunting, his views did not align with those of animal rights organizations at the time. Being wedged between the two positions convinced him to establish his own animal rights organization, the Chicago Animal Rights Coalition. Soon after starting the group, Hindi became opposed to all hunting, throwing away his hunting trophies and becoming a vegan, a practice he later discontinued. He said he did not have the willpower to be vegan, and instead became a vegetarian, wearing nylon belts and synthetic sandals instead of leather. Clifton said Hindi focuses on specific animal rights issues like pigeon shoots, bullfighting, rodeos, and horse slaughter because they are men's issues that other activists are less inclined to approach. Most animal rights activists are women, Clifton said, who aim their attention at women's issues like dressing in fur coats and using animals to test makeup.

To help put an end to the 30-year hunting hobby he now detests, Hindi protests hunts in Illinois and elsewhere. He told the Chicago Tribune in a 1992 interview that regarding hunters, he "decided it would be more sporting for me to fight them than to fight the animals". He continued, "I do still hunt-but I hunt hunters now." To protest hunts, Hindi and a group of other activists tailed the hunter, scared away the prey by being loud, and sometimes got in the line of fire. Hindi said hunting is not necessary in modern society to gather food, so to hunt animals "for the fun of man or woman already denotes a certain loss of ethic".

Jim Ritter of the Chicago Sun-Times said in 1995 that Hindi was "perhaps the most admired animal rights crusader in the Chicago area. And the most hated." The Morning Call's Paul Carpenter, who like Hindi wanted the Hegins pigeon shoot to shut down, wrote that Hindi "calibrate[s] our moral compasses" and is a "brave underground freedom fighter". Chicago Tribune columnist John Husar wrote in 1996 that Hindi was "Chicago's most radical anti-hunting activist". Joel Patenaude of The Beacon News wrote in 1998 that for Hindi, "among sympathetic souls, he is considered creative, tenacious and effective".

== Live pigeon shoots and turkey shoots ==
I used to be a hunter and fisherman. Now, I hunt hunters. I get more satisfaction in saving the lives of animals instead of taking them.

— Steve Hindi on January 14, 2010

In 1992, Hindi served as the president of the Fox Valley Animal Protectors in DuPage County, Illinois. Hindi noticed that live pigeon shoots were happening in the field behind Carpy's Cove, a tavern and restaurant in Will County, Illinois. About four times a year, a dozen to two dozen shooters would pay $100 to shoot 25 pigeons each. Every Sunday, Hindi drove to the bar to check whether people were preparing for a live pigeon shoot. Whenever he found pigeon shoot preparations, Hindi notified around two dozen activists to join him in protesting the shoot.

The Seneca Hunt Club, one of Hindi's earliest aims, held pigeon shoots overseen by the Illinois Conservation Department (now named the Illinois Department of Natural Resources). Hindi attacked the Illinois Conservation Department, calling it names like "Department of Cowards", "Department of Chickens", "Department of Mutilation", "Department of Scumbags", and "Department of Corruption". Following lobbying and activism by Hindi's group and other animal activist groups, the Illinois General Assembly overturned a law that permitted pigeon shoots. In 1992, the office of the Illinois Attorney General published an unofficial notice that said holding pigeon shoots likely would violate Illinois' animal care act. According to a 2007 The State Journal-Register article, pigeon shoots have been prohibited in Illinois since Hindi convinced the Illinois Attorney General's office that pigeon shoots infringed on the state's animal cruelty statutes. The Pennsylvania Record reported in April 2014 that "Pennsylvania is believed to be the only state left in the nation in which shooting pigeons strictly for sport is still legal." The Philadelphia Media Network reported the same month that Pennsylvania is the "only state" to allow live pigeon shooting and that since 1989, repeated bill introductions in the Pennsylvania General Assembly to outlaw live pigeon shooting were unsuccessful.

On June 11, 1995, Hindi surreptitiously filmed a turkey shoot at the Lone Pine Sportsmens Club in Middleport, Schuylkill County, Pennsylvania. In a September 1995 interview with The Morning Call, he said the turkey shoot was "graphic animal abuse more shocking than the infamous Hegins pigeon shoot". At a turkey shoot, the turkeys are situated in a bundle of car tires behind hay bales and their feet are shackled. Participants strike a turkey's head from a distance of 100 yards by using rifles or bows.

In August 2014, Hindi received a message from a supporter of Oklahoma Senator Jim Inhofe about a pigeon shoot fundraiser for the 2014 Senate election at Quartz Mountain Lodge in Lone Wolf, Oklahoma, called the "Jim Inhofe Dove Hunt". The hunt took place on September 5, 2014, and was in its tenth year. Hindi sent an uncover SHARK investigator to videotape the pigeon shoot. Shoot participants kicked injured pigeons and ignored pigeons who were dying. The video of the shoot was posted on the website InhofeCruelty.com. Inhofe, United States Representative Markwayne Mullin, and Principal Chief of the Cherokee Bill John Baker attended the pigeon shoot. In a September 23, 2014, interview with the Associated Press, he said, "Hunting is not supposed to be wanton slaughter. This is the antithesis of hunting. Every hunter, and every gun owner for that matter, should be infuriated by this." Hindi held a press conference at the Oklahoma State Capitol on September 30, demanding that the federal government open an investigation into animal cruelty. People for the Ethical Treatment of Animals and The Humane Society of the United States both criticized the shoot.

== Woodstock Hunt Club ==
On three weekends in September and October 1996, Hindi and fellow Chicago Animal Rights Coalition members protested on land next to the Woodstock Hunt Club, an 85-member club. Using sirens, megaphones, air horns, and aircraft, the activists protested on land bordering the club, scaring away geese. The protests violated the Illinois Hunter Interference Act of 1984, which barred protesters from trying to discourage hunters from killing animals, scaring hunted animals away, and impeding active hunters. (Note: The Illinois Supreme Court ruled in June 1998 that the portion of the law that barred individuals from attempting to discourage hunters from killing animals violated the freedom of speech. The Court found the other parts of the law constitutional.)

McHenry County Circuit Judge James Franz issued a temporary restraining order on October 11 prohibiting protests at the club. On October 12, Hindi fastened to his back a small engine to charge an ultralight aircraft, a 20-horsepower Daiichi Kosho Whisper, fashioned to disturb hunters below it. With a seat and a parasail, the aircraft was powered by a motor, and Hindi ran to raise its sails. Circuit Judge Franz found Hindi in contempt of court on November 6 for ignoring the court's restraining order by continuing his protests at the Woodstock Hunt Club. Franz sentenced Hindi to six months in jail without bail. (Note: McHenry County Circuit Judge James Franz retired in July 1998 after a 12-year tenure. Having overseen thousands of cases, he said Hindi's 1995 case was one of the most prominent. Franz told the Chicago Tribune that "I've gotten faxes all over the world on that case, from Japan, Helsinki, Paris, England. Most of them were negative toward me. It didn't bother me. I ruled as I saw fit and right.")

On November 13, Hindi started an 11-day hunger strike in McHenry County Jail. The hunger strike ended after Hindi was released from jail following a three-member appellate panel decision that Hindi could not be held without bond. In September 1997, the Illinois Appellate Court upheld Circuit Judge Franz's conviction and sentencing of Hindi for contempt of court. and he returned to jail in February 1998. Chicago Tribune columnist Eric Zorn wrote in support of Hindi, saying:

The most serious of the five charges still pending against him after several arrests is a harassment-of-wildlife rap—punishable by up to a year in jail—for allegedly piloting his motorized hang glider too close to a flock of geese. It's the equivalent of charging a would-be Samaritan with trespassing because he raced into a burning building to save fire victims, but that's the law for you.

The Illinois Supreme Court ruled on March 5, 1998, that Hindi should be released on bond while he appealed his case. In a bench trial, Hindi was convicted in January 1999 of violating the Illinois Hunter Interference Act of 1984 by flying his glider near geese to scare them away from hunters. Judge Gordon Graham sentenced him to 18 months conditional discharge in April 1999, saying during the sentencing, "In my analysis, I don't believe Mr. Hindi will benefit by or be deterred by incarceration."

The Woodstock Hunt Club sued Hindi and his group for $411,000, alleging that the club had to refund their customers' payments because of Hindi and his group's protests.

== Bullfighting ==
I know there is a certain mystique in bullfighting, with the costumes and everything. But the nerve of the bullfighter is really more about having the nerve to walk in front of anybody after what he's done to the bull. These people are among the worst animal abusers on the planet.

— Steve Hindi on April 22, 2000

Hindi considers bullfighting to be animal abuse. A 2003 Los Angeles Times article noted that he dared a matador to battle him rather than the bull but the matador refused.

In April 2000, Hindi owned PepsiCo stock worth about $5,000. In 1998, after Hindi found out that PepsiCo sponsored Mexican and Spanish bullfights, he was incensed. Members of Hindi's group traveled to Mexico to film bullfights. The Daily Herald said, "The results are not for the weak of stomach, as the bulls are shown bleeding profusely." Hindi wrote letters to PepsiCo asking the company to cease sponsoring the bullfights and started a website, www.pepsibloodbath.com, that featured images and videos of bloody bulls next to Pepsi's blue banners. The website featured a Pepsi logo that seemed to be dripping blood and said the site "will be removed when Pepsi halts its support of cruel bullfights around the world". He discarded every Pepsi drink from his company's vending machine. Hindi spoke at a California conference with Indian animal rights activists who sent bullfighting videos to then-Indian Minister of State of Social Justice and Empowerment, Maneka Gandhi, the founder of People for Animals. Gandhi wrote an October 31, 1999, letter to Pepsi protesting their bullfighting sponsorship and planned to show SHARK's videos on her two animal rights television stations in India, where cows are believed to be sacred.

In the last week of December 1999, PepsiCo discontinued being a sponsor for Mexican bullfights. The Chicago Tribune's Bill Page said Pepsi's decision was likely influenced by Mexican bullfighting photos shot by SHARK members showing a bull "impaled with pics and spewing gore and blood—all against the backdrop of a Pepsi banner". A PepsiCo spokesperson admitted in a December 1999 interview with The Beacon News that Hindi's efforts were "a significant contributing factor" in the company's bullfighting sponsorship retraction in its taking down billboards in hundreds of bullrings.

== Rodeos ==
=== Wauconda, Illinois, rodeo ===
Hindi said in 1995 regarding rodeos that they "exist on the fear, pain and suffering of animals and their desire to escape". Using a hidden camera, Hindi videotaped rodeos, capturing many hours of what he called rodeo abuse, including bucking and electric prodding. He and fellow activists used bullhorns to protest rodeos organized by the Wauconda Chamber of Commerce in Wauconda, Illinois, and the Lake County sheriff's police union. In a 2004 interview with the Chicago Tribune, Hindi said he and his group had been protesting the Wauconda Rodeo since 1993. In 1997, he sent antagonistic messages with the letterhead "An animal abuser's worst nightmare". Hindi used a video camera capable of recording footage from the distance of over a block to videotape rodeo workers bending animals' tails, flinging sand into their faces, and jabbing them in their sides. The Wauconda Rodeo video showed horses with injuries to their haunches, a steer getting kicked, another steer's tail getting yanked, and children traveling around on sheep. His video received coverage in the TV news, and Lake County State's Attorney Mike Waller launched an investigation into Hindi's animal abuse accusation. Waller asked the Illinois Department of Agriculture and three veterinarians to review the video. The veterinarians said no animal cruelty was shown in the video because the methods used by the rodeo workers were commonly used with sizable animals. Waller dismissed the activists' complaints against the rodeo, saying that the veterinarians unanimously concluded that Illinois' Humane Care for Animals Act was not violated.

In July 1994, Hindi protested at the Wauconda Rodeo, filming the rodeo's rear from the west side of U.S. Route 12. He said the Wauconda mayor's truck stopped near his team, and he told the mayor, "It's really stupid you're supporting this." They had a heated argument, and Hindi said the mayor's passenger backhanded him in the face, striking his nose and cheek. The district attorney dismissed the battery accusation, citing the contradictory witness accounts by the seven spectators his office interviewed and the lack of injury to Hindi. Hindi volunteered to take a polygraph to confirm his description of what happened, but the district attorney declined, noting that courts do not permit polygraph conclusions.

=== Kane County, Illinois, rodeo ===
In May 1998, Hindi asked the Kane County Board to support an ordinance that would prohibit the use of techniques such as electric prods and spurs to force animals to participate in rodeos. He cited the passage of a law in Pittsburgh, Pennsylvania, that banned the abuse of rodeo animals. Noting that the law had the expected result of ending rodeos in Pittsburgh, Hindi said, "It has been our experience that you can't conduct a rodeo without cruelty." The 1998 request was unsuccessful. In 2001, Hindi repeated his request, asking the board to bar people under 18 from taking part in rodeo events like sheep riding.

On June 9, 1998, to demonstrate stun guns hurt rodeo animals, Hindi attended a Kane County Board meeting and asked board members to volunteer to be shocked by a stun gun. Rodeo participants had told the board that stun guns were harmless to animals. No one volunteered to get stunned to see if the stun gun hurt, so Hindi shocked himself multiple times. Regarding the shock from the stun gun, he said, "It hurt like hell." He said the shock felt like a "very, very hard slap" on his arm and likened it to the excruciating pain imposed by the Nazi doctor character portrayed by Laurence Olivier in the 1976 movie Marathon Man.

=== Alone Against the Rodeo documentary ===
In October 2000, the European television network Arte filmed a documentary featuring Hindi and rodeos. Arte filmmakers shadowed Hindi on a 10-day trip to rodeos in Arkansas and Texas. Titled "A Bas le Rodeo" ("Alone Against the Rodeo"), the documentary was slated to be shown on Animal Planet in May 2001. The documentary received the Brigitte Bardot International Genesis Award in 2001.

=== 2002 Cultural Olympiad rodeo ===
In September 1998, Hindi wrote a letter protesting the proposed rodeos at the 2002 Winter Olympics in Utah. In the letter, Hindi said, "The purpose of this letter is to urge you not to taint the Winter Olympics with animal abuse. However, if you should ignore this very good advice, know that we will use your rodeos to spread the truth about these abusive activities to a worldwide audience." Hindi and other animal rights activists asked the Salt Lake Organizing Committee (SLOC) to cancel the Olympic Command Performance Rodeo, a 2002 Cultural Olympiad event, or sever the SLOC's relationship with the event, which was scheduled from February 9–11 in Farmington, Utah. Hindi said that the animal rights groups would protest at the rodeo only and not during the torch relay and the 2002 Winter Olympics if the SLOC disaffiliated itself from the rodeo. Hindi said, "If there is no connection between the Olympics and the rodeo, there would be no reason for us to protest at the Games." Hindi said he hoped that ticket holders would request refunds if the rodeo was no longer a part of the Cultural Olympiad.

Hindi scheduled a debate about rodeo at the Salt Lake City Public Library on January 2, 2002, with five people, three of whom were Professional Rodeo Cowboys Association executives and two of whom were Deseret News columnists who had questioned the animal rights activists' tactics. Hindi set up five chairs at the library's auditorium, each labeled with an invited debater's name, but none of them showed up. Several of the invitees cited schedule conflicts in explaining why they were not able to attend. SLOC President Mitt Romney decided on January 4, 2002, not to cancel or disassociate the SLOC from the rodeo but imposed safety precautions that banned tail twisting and electric prodding. Hindi said he would praise Romney if Romney banned from the event calf roping, steer roping, and steer wrestling, practices Hindi called the cruelest parts of rodeo. Sixty animal rights activists protested the event, and Hindi brought a van with large projection screens that showed past instances of animal cruelty at rodeos.

=== Cheyenne Frontier Days rodeo ===
Singer Carrie Underwood and band Matchbox Twenty called off their concerts at the Cheyenne Frontier Days rodeo in 2006 and 2008, respectively, upon viewing Hindi's rodeo videos. SHARK sent to Matchbox Twenty video clips filmed in 2007 at Frontier Days, which showed the "contorted positions and twisted necks of roped animals". Hindi told the Associated Press in 2008, "We were watching for the lineup at Cheyenne, because if we found some people with a propensity toward animal care, we were going to get in touch with them." Matchbox Twenty cancelled their performance due to the animal abuse accusations, while Carrie Underwood did not explain why she called off her performance. Hindi was sued by Cheyenne Frontier Days' booking company, Romeo Entertainment Group, for allegedly spreading "false and misleading information" and "threats of negative publicity" to persuade the performers not to perform at the rodeo. United States District Court for the District of Wyoming Judge William F. Downes dismissed the lawsuit, ruling that it was filed in the wrong state. In 2008, Hindi created the website ShameOnCheyenne.com to condemn the Cheyenne Frontier Days and record animal mistreatment at the rodeo.

=== Passage of rodeo laws ===
After lobbying from Hindi since 1998, the St. Charles, Illinois, City Council in May 2001 changed the city ordinance to ban people from employing electric prods in slides except when someone is in danger. In 2013, the Oregon Legislative Assembly banned horse tripping when used for amusement. Film from SHARK and The Humane Society of the United States was the impetus for the law, which punished violators with a jail sentence of six months or a $2,500 fine.

=== 2013 traffic stop after the Big Loop Rodeo ===
On May 19, 2013, Hindi attended the Jordan Valley, Oregon, Big Loop Rodeo to document animal abuse and was told by planners to leave the event. After Hindi left, his rental car was followed for 10 miles by two sheriff's deputies from Malheur County, Oregon, on orders from a lieutenant supervisor. Hindi filed a Freedom of Information Act for the officers' dashcam video. The Daily Dot reported that forgetting to turn off their dashcam video, the sheriff's deputies "admit to pulling him over illegally for the sake of intimidation" on camera. The Associated Press reported that when Hindi was stopped by the officers, "[t]here was no probable cause a crime or traffic violation had been committed." Portions of the officers' dialogue:

This… this guy is the real deal… This guy is the one that posted everything last year on his site...
I didn't want to stop the man.
God, we're gonna get sued.
We're gonna be in a world of hurt here.
All because of that rodeo board, you know that right?
Dammit I was still recording!

Having videotaped the officers' following him for ten miles and the subsequent traffic stop, Hindi obtained the officers' dash cam footage and uploaded everything to YouTube. The incident was discussed on reddit's /r/justiceporn, receiving over 1,200 comments. Malheur County Sheriff Brian E. Wolfe told the Associated Press in August 2013 that he was sending all of the recordings and details to the Federal Bureau of Investigation (FBI) for review by the agency.

== The Tiger ==
Hindi placed 100-inch video projector screens "surmounted by 6-foot electronic moving message signs" on his silver Isuzu delivery truck. Named the Tiger, the refurbished truck had a $150,000 price tag and was driven by Hindi to crowded places. The Tiger's first public appearance was in December 2000 at the National Finals Rodeo in Las Vegas. In February 2001, Hindi positioned the Tiger in a parking lot near the Chicago Auto Show. With the sky darkening, Hindi turned on his four signs, illuminating them with vivid red words: "STOP ANIMAL ABUSE". The four video screens concurrently showed a looping video of a calf at a rodeo. In the video, after the calf exits from a chute, someone causes the animal to fall by roping its neck and dragging it across dirt. The Chicago Tribune's Bill Page said the "effect was stunning". People who had been rushing to the Chicago Auto Show entrance "stopped in their tracks and gazed open-mouthed" at Hindi's signs and video. Although most of the people did not speak to Hindi, some asked him questions as he stood next to his truck.

In May 2001, Hindi protested the Walker Brothers Circus event at the Kane County Events Center (now named the Fifth Third Bank Ballpark). He drove around in the Tiger, showcasing film of Tyke, an elephant owned by Hawthorn Corporation, which manages Walker Brothers Circus' animals. Tyke was slaughtered for fatally attacking a trainer in 1994. In September 2001, South Elgin's Anderson Animal Shelter planned to euthanize cats who had been there for more than three months. Hindi joined shelter employees in protesting the decision at a board meeting, bringing his truck with video monitors that said "Let The Cats Live". The board unanimously reversed its earlier decision to euthanize the cats.

During the 2002 Winter Olympics, Hindi used the Tiger to protest the Olympic Command Performance Rodeo. He took the truck along the torch relay, following it for over 7,000 miles from Chicago, to the West Coast of the United States, to Salt Lake City. He drove it to other Olympic events to show film of animal cruelty at rodeos. The Salt Lake Tribune's Lori Buttars called the Tiger a "high-tech propaganda-mobile featuring television monitors showing videotaped acts of animal cruelty". Explicit animal abuse photos were imprinted on the truck's doors. In bright red, the truck's flashing signs said, "Cruelty is not in the Olympic Spirit", and the word "not" was struck out. 10,000 journalists attended the Olympics, and journalists from Germany, Japan, Korea, Norway, and Sweden interviewed Hindi about his truck. Hindi faced "sneers, obscene gestures, colorful epithets and a few rocks and snowballs" in some cities, but in Salt Lake City, he received a mix of praise and criticism.

In 2004, Hindi went to the front of the Illinois State Capitol in Springfield to show on 100-inch screens a video of a horse-slaughter plant in Texas filmed by a colleague. In the secretly taken video, a plant employee approaches a horse with a captive bolt pistol. Partially hidden by sheet metal, the horse can be knocked senseless by one strike. But unlike cows, who are stunned by the same apparatus, horses have longer necks and a dissimilar skull structure that makes stunning more challenging. Horses attempt to evade the stunner, and small parts of its skull become wedged in its brain, ultimately rendering it unconscious. Workers hang the horse by its back legs and cut its throat. The Daily Herald's Garrett Ordower wrote that "While many animal rights groups use their voices as their weapon, Hindi uses technology, specifically video."

== Other animal rights activism ==
You take dolphins that travel 100 miles a day in pods, with their own children, and now they are going to spend the rest of their lives in a concrete coffin, eating dead fish and swimming in circles. The Oceanarium is a chlorinated toilet bowl compared to where the whales come from, and now they're swimming in circles, too, or they just lay there.

— Steve Hindi on November 4, 1993

In 1993, Hindi said his group would protest against the conservationists' decision to stop overpopulation of white-tailed deer by shooting them. Hindi said they would damage deer bait sites in Waterfall Glen Forest Preserve. On February 26, 1993, Circuit County Associate Judge C. Andrew Hayton convicted Hindi of trespassing in the Waterfall Glen Forest Preserve on February 1. The judge levied a fine of $350 against Hindi and ordered him to stay away from the forest reserve for one year. Hindi and fellow coalition member Michael Durschmid Jr. said Hindi's conviction was incorrect because Durschmid, not Hindi, had been videotaping the deer killings in the forest. They said a ranger police officer chased Durschmid through the forest. The officer stopped the chase once he found Hindi outside the forest and arrested him. Hindi appealed Judge Hayton's conviction on the grounds that the judge neglected to tell him he could have selected a jury trial. Prosecutors admitted their oversight in a confession of error, a legal document, and an appeals court granted Hindi a new trial. In response, the county dropped the charges. Hindi sued the forest preserve district and the state's attorney who oversaw the case for $1.1 million.

Beginning in April 1993, Hindi protested against Shedd Aquarium. In 1993, Hindi placed protest signs on long poles with messages like "Captivity Kills" and "Thanks but no tanks". His eight-year-old daughter, Meghan, created a sign from bed sheets that said "Welcome to Whale Hell". Hindi passed out flyers with an article from oceanographer Jean-Michel Cousteau titled "Magnificent dolphins deserve better than captivity". Every Sunday in 1994, Hindi and his coalition protested outside Shedd. Using a megaphone, Hindi complained about the Shedd's "concrete, chlorinated tanks" for being "aquaprison[s]" for whales and dolphins.

In April 1996, Hindi parasailed over the Richmond Hunt Club in Richmond, Illinois, capturing footage of hunters' pheasant shooting from a video camera attached to his helmet. In February 2012, Hindi's group used a MikroKopter drone to attempt to capture video of a pigeon shoot at a plantation near Ehrhardt, South Carolina.

In August 2013, Hindi videotaped and demonstrated against the selling of Labrador Retriever puppies from the rear cargo area of a pickup truck in a restaurant's parking lot. Stating that the parking lot pet sales entice impetuous purchasers, Hindi worried that the new puppy owners would be unready to give their pets adequate care. Pets would be discarded or sent to animal shelters. He said purchasers did not receive the puppies' healthcare records including information about vaccinations. Any issues that arose with the puppies could not be remedied, Hindi said. The purchasers bought the pets with cash so do not have documents confirming who sold them the puppies.

In August 2014, Hindi denounced as animal abuse the Pig Rassling fundraiser held by the St. Patrick Catholic Church in Stephensville, Wisconsin. Held annually, the 44-year-old event involves two to six participants wrestling a pig in a sodden enclosure and depositing the animal in a bucket. Hindi's colleague videotaped the event, which SHARK said showed "animal abuse, animal fighting and child neglect". In a 15-minute video from the group, a limping pig attempts to evade people who chase it. Other pigs in the video are pounced upon and released from a couple feet in the air, causing them to "run away squealing and panting". The video also showed pigs urinating and defecating in the wet dirt. Pig Rassling participants' bodies and faces, including children's, are smeared with the dirt. After the event, Hindi took the footage and $10,000 in "cold, hard cash" to Roman Catholic Diocese of Green Bay's office. At the diocesan chancery, he was unable to speak with Bishop David L. Ricken but spoke with the communications director. He promised to give the money to Ricken if Ricken, the parish priest, and the "Pig Rassling" organizers would act as a substitutes for the pigs during the event.

== SHARK ==
In 1993 he founded CHARC and decided to take a very direct approach to activism. Instead of picketing events or just describing cruelty to others, he espouses a version of the motto "Show me the money"—in his words, "Give me the proof." For Hindi, technology is the weapon of choice. CHARC specializes in filming animal abuse (secretly or not, in Illinois or elsewhere) and distributing footage to news outlets so that the world can see cruelty in its uncensored ugliness.

— Jill Howard Church in Speaking Out for Animals: True Stories About Real People Who Rescue Animals

Hindi is the founder and president of SHARK, which he started in 1993. Originally called the Fox Valley Animal Protectors, the organization evolved into the Chicago Animal Rights Coalition and is currently called Showing Animals Respect and Kindness. In 1995, 400 people were subscribed to the coalition's mailing list, and the group had about a dozen very involved members. Hindi said the organization's rename from "Chicago Animal Rights Coalition" (CHARC) to "Showing Animals Respect and Kindness" (SHARK) around 1998 was to make the organization's name not geographically restrictive. A fellow activist said "SHARK" could stand for "Steve Hindi's Animal Rights Kommandos". Hindi said the group has two purposes: record animal abuse and disseminate data. The group's crest is a large shark "whose gaping jaws are ready to bite".

In 1997, the coalition's mailing list grew to 600 people. Established as a charity, SHARK had a budget of between $70,000 and $80,000 in 2001. Supported by donations, SHARK received much of its funding from Hindi in 2001. In 2007, The State Journal-Register reported that tax returns revealed that SHARK received about $100,000 in donations every year and does not have paid employees. Tax forms showed that Hindi worked about 50 hours per week for SHARK.

SHARK is an animal protection group based in Geneva, Illinois. The group's mission is to end animal cruelty at rodeos. Hindi posts on SHARK's YouTube channel rodeo videos and highlights animals' wounds. SHARK's YouTube channel had 40 rodeo videos that were pulled in December 2007 because of copyright complaints by the Professional Rodeo Cowboys Association and reinstated later in the month.
