= Care Management Group =

British care provider

Care Management Group (CMG) was a UK provider of specialist support services to children and adults with learning disabilities, physical disabilities, chronic and enduring mental health needs, sensory and communication impairments, and associated complex needs including challenging behaviour.

CMG was a large care provider in the UK with around 180 services in London, the South of England and South Wales including Supported Living Services, Domiciliary Care and Outreach support, Support in the Community and Day Skills and Residential and Respite Care. The company employed approximately 1800 staff.

== History ==
CMG was established by Michael Buckinghams in 1996. In 2003, venture capital group ISIS Equity Partners backed a £30 million management buy-out.

The company formerly operated care homes. In 2008, Chai Patel took control of CMG, which was previously owned by a private equity firm.

It applied in April 2017 to increase the maximum number of people at its Cherry Tree service in Essex from seven to 10 and was refused by the Care Quality Commission because it did not comply with its Registering the Right Support policy guidance to not develop campus site services. The company appealed to a care standards tribunal panel which upheld the CQC's decision.
