= Four Seasons Health Care =

British health and social care provider

- Industry: Healthcare
- Founded: 1988
- Defunct: April 2025
- Headquarters: United Kingdom
- Number of locations: 440

Four Seasons Health Care was a British provider of health and social care services. It also owned The Huntercombe Group, a provider of inpatient mental healthcare and brain injury rehabilitation as well as care home operator brighterkind. Four Seasons, as it is today, was created both organically and by the buying out of smaller chains of care homes and rebranding them, as evidenced by the takeovers of Tamaris (formerly Quality Care Homes) and Bettercare. At its largest it was the second-biggest care home operator in the UK.

== Expansion ==
Set up in 1988 by Robert Kilgour, it opened its first care home, Station Court in Kirkcaldy in Fife, Scotland, in May 1989 and remained a small operator building up to seven care homes in Fife by 1997. The size and fortunes of the business were changed with the appointment by chief executive Robert Kilgour of Hamilton Anstead as joint chief executive. There followed an expansion programme for the business, which became within seven years the largest care home operator in the UK. The business was sold for £775 million in 2004. Anstead ceased to be CEO in 2005.

The company was acquired for around £1.5bn in 2006 by Three Delta LLP, the investment fund backed by the state of Qatar, and further expanded. The acquisition was funded by debt which was readily available in a market where investors saw rising property prices and continuing demand for care for the elderly, much of it paid for by the public sector. However, the company was unable to pay its debts and with a downturn in the property markets was unable to refinance, and the owners walked away, losing their investment.

Peter Calveley was appointed CEO in 2007 and his senior management team were left to resolve debts of circa £1.5 billion as a result of borrowings by its owners to buy the homes.

The Group completed a financial restructuring in December 2009, with lenders – banks and other financial institutions – agreeing to swap about £780 million of debt for equity in the business, so becoming its new shareholders. Maturity of the remaining debt was extended to September 2012. Four Seasons was then trading profitably with an EBITDA of over £100m pa. The quality of care performance changed from below the sector's average to having 89% of its homes rated good or excellent by the Care Quality Commission.

== Specialist care ==
This turnaround in quality helped to drive up occupancy to around 88%. Another factor in the Group's performance was Calveley's strategy of anticipating market changes in order to provide specialist care. Four Seasons has 80% nursing or high dependency beds and 20% residential, in contrast to the sector average of 55% residential. It developed services for people who are physically frail or suffering from the onset of dementia or chronic neurological conditions, respite care, intermediate care and rehabilitation, and terminal care. Because there are few readily available alternatives for high dependency care – such as care provision at home – the market for higher dependency care is more resilient than the market for residential care.

== Acquisitions ==
As of July 2011 the Group had achieved substantial expansion without new borrowings by acquiring the operations of Care Principles with 17 hospitals and homes – nearly doubling the size of FSHC's specialist care business – and 1,000 additional care home places (c. 6% growth) through acquisitions over the preceding year from Craegmoor and Eton Square Healthcare. As of September 2011 the group was expected to acquire over 100 care homes from the collapsed provider Southern Cross, which would make it the largest provider in the UK.

In 2012 the company was bought by Terra Firma Capital Partners for £825 million. It has three divisions: brighterkind, with 70 private pay-focused care homes; Four Seasons, which has around 300 homes; and The Huntercombe Group, with around 35 specialist mental health facilities and around 25,000 staff.

The underlying bond debt was bought by H/2 Capital Partners which has investments in senior living or similar nursing homes in the United States. Terra Firma has offered to give the company to them.

== Liquidity problems ==
In November 2015 the company planned to sell 14 care homes as going concerns, and "a portfolio of homes currently run by third party operators" to assist its liquidity problems, hoping to raise £60 million. It had £565 million worth of debt, with annual interest and rent obligations of about £110 million. It later announced plans to close seven homes in Northern Ireland: Victoria Park and Stormont in Belfast; Antrim; Garvagh; Donaghcloney near Banbridge; Oakridge in Ballynahinch, County Down; Hamilton Court in Armagh.

In December 2015 it was reported that the company had sold £20 million worth of properties to Monarch Alternative Capital, a US investment fund which claims to specialise in swooping on "distressed and bankrup"” companies.

In April 2016 it reported a 39% drop in profits which was blamed on the cuts in the local government social care budget and the introduction of the UK living wage, although its average weekly care fees rose by 3.4 per cent. The company had net debt of £565 million, because Terra Firma borrowed heavily to fund the purchase in 2012. The business has to find annual interest payments of about £50 million. Earnings before interest, tax, debt and amortisation fell from £64.1 million in 2014 to £38.7 million in 2015. Its property portfolio was revalued down by £224 million to £505 million and its credit rating has plummeted.

In September 2017 The Daily Telegraph reported that a legal mistake meant that bondholders had inadvertently already been given ownership of 71 care homes and hence could not use them as security to raise extra money. A High Court hearing led by a major bondholder – the US hedge fund H/2 Capital Partners – was scheduled for April or June 2018 but the firm was unlikely to be able to restructure before then. The following month the company warned it could not meet a £26m payment due in December without restructuring and if this was delayed the bondholders could potentially seize its assets of 360 nursing homes. This would probably lead to an intervention by the Care Quality Commission (CQC). A restructuring was planned for November and Four Seasons' owners would add 24 care homes in exchange for reduced and delayed repayments of 175m of bonds maturing in 2020. In December the company narrowly avoided collapse after the principle bondholder agreed to wait until February 2018 for a restructuring proposal. According to The Daily Telegraph, the cause of Four Seasons' problem is a 90% reduction in the number of EU nurses and a cut in state funding.

In October 2018 H/2 Capital Partners replaced the management and put the business up for sale. In April 2019 the holding companies Elli Finance (UK) and Elli Investments were put into administration.

The company handed over 44 care homes to rivals Roseberry, Harbour Healthcare, Belsize Healthcare and Barchester Healthcare in December 2019. Administrators from Mazars arranged the sale of 11 care homes to Barchester Healthcare in April 2020. They plan to sell more 33 care homes as going concerns.

In June 2022 it appointed Christie's to oversee an auction of its core portfolio, not including the business in Northern Ireland, which consists of 111 sites across the UK. There are around 6000 residents and 10,000 staff. Its 29 homes in Northern Ireland, with 1415 beds, were sold to Beaumont Care Homes in August 2022. The last 111 Four Seasons facilities in England, Scotland, and Jersey were then up for sale.

In June 2024, the Four Seasons Health Care Group appointed CBRE to advise on a sales process for the Group, which then consisted of 46 freehold care homes trading under either the Four Seasons Health Care or brighterkind brands.

The company simultaneously transferred all of its remaining homes to new providers on April 25, 2025, and ceased to be an operational company on this day. The company is now in liquidation.

== See also ==
- Private medicine in the United Kingdom
