= Priory Hospital =

Coordinates: 51.46265°N 0.25204°W

The Priory Hospital, Roehampton
- Priory Group

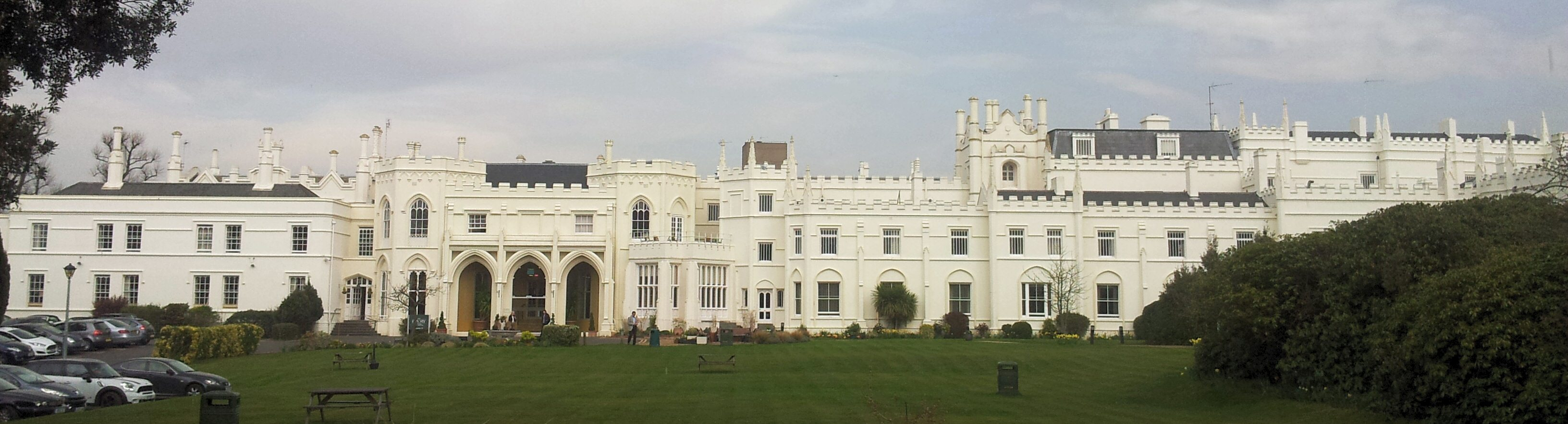
- The Priory Hospital

- Location within Wandsworth

Geography
- Location: Roehampton; London, SW15; United Kingdom

Organisation
- Type: Mental health: outpatient and residential

Services
- Beds: 107

History
- Founded: 1872; 154 years ago

Links
- Website: priorygroup.com

The Priory Hospital, Roehampton, often referred to as The Priory, is a private mental health hospital in South West London. It was founded in 1872 and is part of the Priory Group.

The Priory has an international reputation and, because of the number of celebrities who have sought treatment there, widespread coverage in the press. The hospital treats mild to moderate mental health issues, such as stress and anxiety, through outpatient treatments such as cognitive behavioural therapy as well as in-patient care for more severe psychiatric illness such as depression, psychotic illness, addictions or eating disorders. It has residential facilities for 107 patients.

== Building ==
American singer and actor Paul Robeson, an early celebrity patient of the Priory

The Priory operates from a Grade II listed building located in Roehampton in south-west London. Originally a private home, it was built in 1811 in the Gothic revival style. The Priory has been variously described in the press as a "white Gothic mansion", "Strawberry Hill Gothic", and "a white-painted fantasy of Gothic spikes and battlements".

== History ==
The building was converted from a private home into a hospital in 1872 by William Wood, one of the first modern psychiatrists. It is London's longest established private psychiatric hospital. Early celebrity patients included, in the 1880s, the wife of the Victorian politician Jabez Balfour, and, in the 1960s, the American singer Paul Robeson.

In 1980 the hospital was acquired by an American healthcare company, and became the first clinic in what was to become the Priory Group. The Priory subsequently benefited from two developments in the 1980s. Firstly, celebrities began seeking treatment at the hospital, attracted not only by clinical excellence, but also by location and, according to one press report, "a version, much-updated, of the smartest 19th century spa experience". Secondly, the National Health Service was forced to close down some of its mental health hospitals and instead began referring patients to the Priory. By the early 1990s, almost half the Priory Group's patients were funded by the UK government.

The Priory has also been subject to adverse comment in recent years. The British Association for Counselling and Psychotherapy has criticised the hospital for offering treatment for "lifestyle addictions", such as compulsive texting, and because patients were paying for "the kudos attached to the clinic's name" (although it acknowledged the hospital provided a first-class service).

The Priory is regulated by the UK's Care Quality Commission and is registered with the commission to provide medical treatment including the treatment of patients detained under the Mental Health Act 1983. In 2011, the Commission inspected the Priory and found that it "was not meeting one or more essential standards. Improvements are needed." The commission has also stated that they have required the Priory to undertake improvements in four out of the five areas which they reviewed: treating people with respect and involving them in their care; providing care, treatment and support that meets people's needs; staffing; and quality and suitability of management. In the remaining fifth area, caring for people safely and protecting them from harm, the Commission considered that all standards were met and no improvements were required.

It was reported in 2010 that the Priory had undergone a £3 million refurbishment to restore it to its original 1811 condition. Rooms were reportedly refurnished and repainted in colours intended to promote "well-being".

Ultimate ownership of the Priory has passed through several hands since the 1980s and, in 2011, the Priory Group was sold by Royal Bank of Scotland to Advent International, an American private equity firm. In 2016, Priory Group was sold to Arcadia Healthcare, a US company, and in 2021 it was then sold to Waterland, a Dutch private equity company.

== Facilities ==
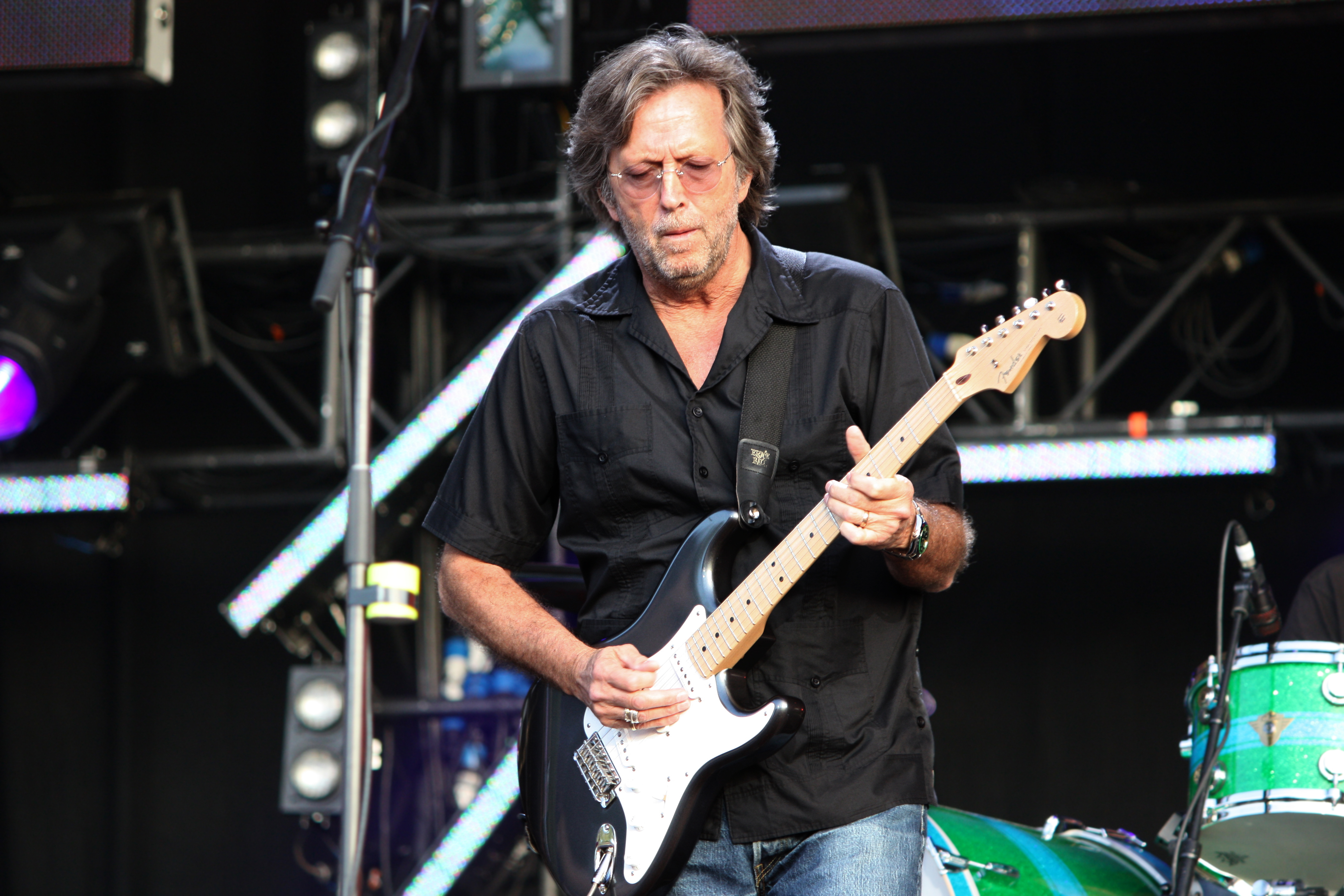
Rock guitarist Eric Clapton, former patient of the Priory

The Priory is the flagship hospital of the Priory Group and is best known for treating celebrities particularly for drug addiction. It has been described as the British equivalent of the Betty Ford Clinic in terms of its popular image.

=== Treatment programmes ===
The hospital provides outpatient and day patient care for people suffering from mild to moderate mental health issues and in-patient care for more severe psychiatric illness such as depression, psychotic illness or eating disorders. Its healthcare services cover the following:

- General psychiatry including depression, anxiety, post traumatic stress disorder, obsessive compulsive disorders, schizophrenia and other acute psychiatric illnesses.
- Addiction treatment programme for addictions relating to alcohol, drugs, gambling, relationships and shopping
- Eating disorder unit and day care services with programmes for anorexia, bulimia, binge eating and other conditions related to eating disorders.
- Child and adolescent mental health service for ages 12 to 18.

Treatments offered reportedly include cognitive behavioural therapy, psychotherapy, EMDR (eye movement desensitisation and reprocessing), Neuro-linguistic Programming (NLP) equine assisted psychotherapy, psychodrama, and art and movement therapy. ECT (Electro-convulsive therapy) is also used, with about 500 to 600 treatments per year. The other facilities include a fully equipped gym with fitness instructor, tai chi, yoga, and aerobics classes, swimming, aromatherapy and shiatsu massage. It has residential facilities for 107 patients who stay in individual rooms with en-suite bathrooms; fees are said to be in excess of £2,500 per week.

It has been reported that the Priory has had contracts with the UK's Ministry of Defence to treat military personnel (including for PTSD, post-traumatic stress disorder) and with the BBC to treat a number of its executives.

== Priory Lodge School ==
In 2010, the hospital opened the Priory Lodge School in its grounds. The school specialises in caring for and educating children with autistic spectrum disorders, in particular Asperger’s Syndrome and associated learning difficulties and charges fees of £65,000 per year. In 2014 it was rated "Good" by Ofsted, the second-highest rating in a four-point scale.

== Celebrity patients ==
- Caroline Aherne
- Lily Allen
- Michael Barrymore
- George Best
- Susan Boyle
- Antonio Carluccio
- Tom Chaplin
- Craig Charles
- Eric Clapton
- Graham Coxon
- Pete Doherty
- Johnny Depp
- Richey Edwards
- Michael Elphick
- Paul Gascoigne
- Jade Goody
- Justin Hawkins
- Lady Isabella Hervey
- Michael Johnson
- John McGeogh
- Jim Mollison
- Kate Moss
- Sinéad O'Connor
- António Horta Osório
- Ronnie O'Sullivan
- Marti Pellow
- Katie Price
- Gail Porter
- Paul Robeson
- Ruby Wax
- Robbie Williams
- Amy Winehouse
- Paula Yates

== See also ==
- List of hospitals in England
- Grovelands Park, a Priory Hospital in Southgate, London
