= H/2 Capital Partners =

American hedge fund

- Company type: Private
- Industry: Hedge Fund
- Founded: 1999
- Headquarters: Stamford, CT

H/2 Capital Partners is a privately owned hedge fund based in Stamford, Connecticut founded in 1999 run by the American financier Spencer Haber.

It was a major creditor of Four Seasons Health Care in the UK and has substantial investments in senior living and similar nursing homes in the United States. It took over Four Seasons in September 2019 for an estimated £400 million, acquiring about 185 of the group’s freehold sites and offering a financial guarantee to secure the running of the remaining 135 homes held on leaseholds.
