= HC-One =

Care home operator in the United Kingdom

- Type: Care Home Group
- Industry: Healthcare management
- Predecessor: Southern Cross Healthcare
- Founder: Dr Chai Patel CBE FRCP
- Headquarters: Darlington, United Kingdom
- Number of locations: 275
- Area served: Residential and Nursing Care Homes
- Key people: David Smith (CFO); James Tugendhat (CEO)
- Number of employees: 19,000 (2022)
- Website: hc-one.co.uk

HC-One is Britain's largest care home operator, with more than 275 care homes across England, Scotland and Wales specialising in dementia, nursing and residential care for older people.

== History ==
HC-One was formed following the collapse of the UK's then-largest care home operator, Southern Cross Healthcare. Entrepreneur Chai Patel, a doctor and former Chief Executive of Priory Group, formed HC-One, which became operational on 1 November 2011.

Since its inception, HC-One has broadened its offering across the UK by acquiring care homes from providers including Bupa, Helen McCardle Care, and Meridian Healthcare. It also opened three newly built care homes between December 2020 and October 2021, including its first care home in York – Mossdale Residence.

In November 2018, HC-One was awarded Care Home Group of the Year at the National Care Awards in London.

In September 2020, James Tugendhat joined HC-One as Chief Executive Officer, and Dame Ruth Carnall was appointed as non-executive Chair of the Board in September 2022.

For the year ending 30 September 2022, HC-One announced losses of £6.1million and a company spokesperson described it as "exceptional times". The following year, HC-One announced further losses – this time at £63million.

In 2025, HC-One was acquired by real estate firm and the UK's largest care home investor, Welltower Inc.

== Acquisitions ==
In 2015, HC-One acquired 30 care homes from Meridian Healthcare in Greater Manchester, Merseyside, West Yorkshire, North Lincolnshire, Cheshire and Derbyshire. In 2017, HC-One purchased 20 care homes from Helen McArdle Care, making them the largest care home provider in the North East of England.

In August 2017 it bought 122 care homes, with 9,000 beds, from Bupa for £300 million, making it the biggest care home company in the UK with 22,000 beds in total.

In February 2021 it announced the sale of 52 care homes and closure of four more. At the same time it announced it was refurbishing 200 care homes and opening two more.

BBC Panorama broadcast an investigative programme on Dec 6th 2021 analysing the financial structure of the company, owned by Private Equity, with the charge that just two days after writing to UK local authorities asking for financial help due to the COVID-19 pandemic, it paid out £4.8m in dividends.

In 2024 the company acquired Ideal Carehomes.

== Incidents ==
One of HC-One's homes, Oban House, was featured in an episode of the BBC's Panorama programme, investigating poor care there and at another home owned by another company. In response, HC-One expressed a desire to install surveillance cameras in its homes to prevent a recurrence.

A multi-agency review into HC One's Blar Buidhe Care Home in the Outer Hebrides is under way following a number of concerns raised over the dietary programmes of residents.

The company has lost several unfair dismissal cases. As a result, they consistently scores around 2.5/10 from ex-employee reviews on the anonymous website Glassdoor.

In 2016 the Four Seasons Care Home in Breightmet, labelled inadequate by the Care Quality Commission in May 2015 was banned from taking new residents while concerns about the administration of medicines and the leadership and management of the home were investigated. The company said they were forced to rely on temporary agency nurses.

After a 72-year-old was burned by a portable heater at Elmwood Nursing Home in Croydon in March 2016, HC-One were fined £45,000. The CQC's deputy chief inspector of adult social care, said: "This painful injury could have been avoided if HC-One Limited had taken responsibility to protect the people in their care."

In May 2019, HC-One received a £270,000 fine after a resident at its Lomond Court Care Home in Fife died after eating a chlorine cleaning tablet.

A documentary episode from Panorama in 2021, titled Care in Crisis: Follow the Money, showed that one–fifth of HC-One's self-funders' weekly fees are used to finance debt, build up investment and provide a financial return to investors. It also revealed they borrowed £300m in 2017, including £80m from commercial lenders, one of which was its private equity owner which charged an interest rate of 15-18%. Panorama also revealed HC-One wrote to the government in 2017 requesting pandemic support two days after paying out £4.8m in dividends. It went on to receive £18.9m in government aid. Former Secretary of State for Health and Social Care Jeremy Hunt said the findings were "utterly shocking", adding: "It is the unacceptable face of capitalism and is wholly inappropriate considering the point of the sector is to look after our most vulnerable people."

In the wake of an outbreak of COVID-19 infections at a care home run by HC-One in the Isle of Skye, the Scottish Care Inspectorate took legal action to take over running the Home Farm care home. It also moved to cancel the company's registration of the care home. As of May 2020, at least 10 residents had died at Home Farm Care Home and all but four residents tested positive. Claims included that air freshener was being used as a disinfectant, there was a failure to provide some ill residents with oxygen and that some people did not receive the right support to eat and drink well, as well as some residents were also reported to have been lying in urine and faeces, including occasions when the urine and faeces had dried which poses health risks. In March 2022, it was reported that the Crown Office were considering doing reports into the deaths. It was also stated that prosecutors were reviewing three deaths.

In May 2020, staff members told of their concerns over alleged failings in the care of suspected coronavirus patients in homes in Scotland. A number of whistleblowers who work in HC-One care homes across Scotland told LBC News that safe practices were not being correctly followed, including being told to come in and work despite having symptoms as well as being asked to work with residents who have coronavirus without adequate PPE. At the time of the concerns being raised, HC-One ran 56 care homes in Scotland. As of May 2020, 207 HC-One residents in Scotland had died with Coronavirus which – at the time – equated to 14% of all care home deaths linked to COVID-19 in the country. In September 2021, it was revealed that the company had begun sacking staff who refused to have the COVID-19 vaccine.

In January 2022, the company were fined £640,000 after a resident at one of its homes choked to death on a jam doughnut. The resident, who had previously suffered from a stroke and had been diagnosed with dementia, was assessed as being at high risk of choking and was on a "minced and moist/fork mashable" diet. An investigation by the HSE found that staff who gave out snacks at Orchard Care Home had not been properly trained and did not have awareness of food that was suitable for each diet.

In March 2022, HC-One were forced to apologise after a dementia resident was left stuck in a cupboard. Police were called to the home more than two hours after the resident went missing. The woman was taken to hospital where she received treatment for dehydration and bruising to her head. HC-One apologised to the resident's daughter and admitted she should have been informed earlier that her mother had gone missing. They were ordered to pay a fine of £1,300.

HC-One apologised in March 2023 after admitting there were "unacceptable mistakes" in the care of three people who died after living at a home. The care home, The Elms in Whittlesey, was later closed due to multiple failures including shortcomings, poor care and issues with record keeping.

An investigation from the BBC in October 2023 revealed that 46 allegations across four years were recorded by police at the five homes run by HC-One in Cambridgeshire. Rape, neglect and staff assaulting residents were among the complaints recorded.

== See also ==
- Care Management Group
