= Gavin MacFadyen =

American investigative journalist and documentary filmmaker

- Born: Gavin Hall Galter; January 1, 1940; Greeley, Colorado, U.S.
- Died: October 22, 2016 (aged 76); London, England
- Education: Shimer College, London Film School
- Occupation: Investigative journalist
- Spouses: Virginia Daum (divorced) Susan Benn (m. 2010)
- Children: one son, three stepdaughters

Gavin Hall MacFadyen (né Galter; January 1, 1940 – October 22, 2016) was an American investigative journalist and documentary filmmaker. He was the director of the Centre for Investigative Journalism (CIJ) at Goldsmiths, University of London; Co-Founder with Eileen Chubb of the UK whistleblower support group, The Whistler; and a Trustee of the Courage Foundation. He was acknowledged as a ″beloved director of WikiLeaks″ shortly after his death in 2016.

MacFadyen facilitated and protected whistleblowing activities and organized events at which whistleblowers and former intelligence personnel spoke publicly. He acted as an advocate for Julian Assange and Chelsea Manning, eventually becoming a director of the Centre for Investigative Journalism. Closely linked to Assange, he formed the official Julian Assange Defense Committee, which raises funds to pay the legal expenses of Assange and other WikiLeaks staff. MacFadyen has appeared in a number of documentaries about Wikileaks, including We Steal Secrets and Julian Assange: A Modern Day Hero?

The Gavin MacFadyen Award has been presented annually since 2017, for which nominations are accepted from and voted on by whistleblowers only.

== Early life ==
MacFadyen was born Gavin Hall Galter on January 1, 1940, in Greeley in Colorado, and grew up in Chicago. His mother was a pianist. He adopted the surname of his stepfather, a medical researcher. He studied at Shimer College from 1958 to 1959, and later worked as a union organizer with trade unions. He was jailed for participating in civil rights demonstrations. He moved to England, joined the International Socialists (which later became the Socialist Workers Party (UK)), and graduated from the London School of Film Technique (now the London Film School). He founded a documentary film group to chronicle the political turmoil in the United States during the late 1960s for the BBC. He covered the anti-Vietnam War protests, race riots and the police clash with demonstrators at the Democratic National Convention in Chicago in 1968, where tens of thousands of Vietnam War protesters battled police in the streets, while the Democratic Party fell apart over an internal disagreement concerning its stance on Vietnam. He went on to report from the Nicaraguan Revolution, a war between the right-wing Contras and the Marxist Sandinista National Liberation Front in the 1980s, and Iran-Contra, neo-Nazi violence, Watergate, the history of the CIA.

== Career ==
=== Filmmaking and investigative journalism ===
MacFadyen had produced and directed more than 50 documentaries since the 1970s many for Granada Television’s World In Action, investigating a diverse range of topics that includes industrial accidents, neo-Nazi violence in the UK, Chinese criminal societies, the history of the CIA, Watergate, election fraud in Guyana, the Iraq arms trade, child labour, nuclear proliferation, and Frank Sinatra's connection to organised crime. His programmes have been featured on Channel 4, the BBC, Panorama, Granada Television, ABC, and PBS Frontline.

Collaborating with Chicago director Michael Mann, he played Boreksco, a corrupt police officer, in Mann's 1981 debut feature film, Thief, and was a technical adviser to The Insider, Mann's 1999 film about Jeffrey Wigand, a researcher at the tobacco company Brown & Williamson in Louisville, Kentucky, owned by British American Tobacco, who became among the most famous corporate whistleblowers in the United States. Wigand revealed the industry deceptions and practices of Big Tobacco that got people hooked. Wigand's decision to become a whistleblower came at great cost to his personal life - Brown & Williamson unleashed a smear campaign against him - and brought risks to his personal safety. Wigand's disclosures played a crucial role in the case brought by the states' attorneys general against the major tobacco companies, which resulted in a $246 billion settlement to offset medical costs incurred treating smoking-related illnesses, and in the decision Justice Department to seek billions of dollars in additional damages from the tobacco makers (Tobacco Master Settlement Agreement).

In April 2003 MacFadyen co-founded with Michael Gillard the Centre for Investigative Journalism (CIJ) as a non-profit organisation to address the worsening media climate for in-depth, sceptical and adversarial reporting. MacFadyen directed the organisation's International Journalism Summer Schools in 2003, 2004, and 2006. MacFadyen was a visiting professor at Goldsmiths, University of London, and acted as a visiting professor at City University from 2003 to 2014 when it acted as CIJ's base.

He and Eileen Chubb co-founded The Whistler, which was intended to provide a legal, psychological and social support network for whistleblowers from any organization, public or private, in the UK and he was also a supporter of Edna's Law. At The Whistler's launch in February 2014 a number of international whistleblowers spoke: former MI5 intelligence officer Annie Machon, former CIA analyst Ray McGovern, NSA whistleblower Thomas A. Drake, and Jesselyn Radack of the Government Accountability Project (GAP) (The Whistler's US counterpart).

MacFadyen became an early mentor and defender of WikiLeaks and friend of Julian Assange, an Australian computer programmer, who founded WikiLeaks in 2006 and published millions of secret documents, many supplied by Chelsea Manning, a US Army intelligence analyst. MacFadyen helped form the Julian Assange Defense Committee along with his wife Susan Benn and the journalist John Pilger.

=== Grants and other professional interests ===
MacFadyen co-designed the South African Power Reporting Workshops from 2005 to 2007 at the University of Witwatersrand in Johannesburg. He directed the New York conference on Financial and Business Investigative Journalism in 2005 at Columbia University. He has also acted as a mentor at the Fact/Fiction Workshops run by Performing Arts Labs.

He received a European Union MEDIA Programme grant in 1998 for work on a Social History website project, and was a senior research fellow at Caledonian University in 2000 and at Glasgow University from 2002 to 2003.

== Personal life ==
MacFadyen lived in the Pimlico district of London with his wife, Susan Benn. He died of lung cancer in London on October 22, 2016, at the age of 76. In addition to Susan Benn, he was survived by a son, Michael, from his first marriage to Virginia Daum; three stepdaughters and six grandchildren. When MacFadyen died, Assange asked to be allowed to temporarily leave his asylum in the Ecuadorian embassy to attend the funeral, but the request was denied by Sweden's Attorney General Anders Perklev.

== Filmography ==
Year	Title	Role	Notes
1981	Thief	Boreksco	
1985	Latino	Major Metcalf	
1994	Beg!	Detective Bland	
