= 2001 Genesis Awards Winners =

This is a listing of The Winners from the 2001 Genesis Awards.

== Film ==
Featured Film: "Chicken Run" (DreamWorks Animation)

== Television ==
Network Newsmagazine: "Dateline NBC," for two powerful, sobering exposes—on puppy mills and on broadtail fur.

Television Dramatic Series: "Family Law" (CBS), for a story featuring a custody battle for a chimpanzee, exploring the arguments against keeping primates as companion animals.

Television Comedy Series: "Popular" (The WB), for an episode addressing the consumption of beef and the use of leather products

Television Talk Show: "Politically Incorrect" (ABC) For an episode featuring a debate on the ethics of sport hunting and the philosophical conflict between animal rights and human desires.

Cable Documentary: "Investigative Reports" (A&E), for an episode focusing on conservation and ecological challenges facing bison in Yellowstone National Park

Cable Newsmagazine: "CNN & TIME magazine" (CNN), for exposing greyhound racing.

Cable Documentary Series: "Earth Rescue" (Outdoor Life Network), for a feature on circus elephants that examined their capture, transportation, training, and living conditions

PBS Documentary: "Nature" for an unprecedented look at the history of elephants held captive for human curiosity and entertainment.

PBS Series: "ITN World News" for its international coverage of animal abuse and cruelty

News Series: KING-TV (Seattle), for a seven-part series revealing the suffering of cows as they are turned into food.

News Feature: KARE-TV (Minneapolis), for revealing the cruelty to horses in the production of Premarin.

Children's Programming: "Nick News With Linda Ellerbee." (Nickelodeon), for introducing information on myriad animal issues, presented in a format easily embraced by children.

Children's Programming - Animated: "The Wild Thornberrys" (Nickelodeon) for its thematic focus on animal empathy and environmental responsibility

Cartoonist: "Cathy," for challenging the fur industry's hype with style and wit, and for promoting the adoption of older dogs from shelters.

== Print ==
Periodical: The Atlantic Monthly, for "From the Leash to the Laboratory," which unmasks the trade involving the theft of dogs for sale to laboratories.

== Special awards ==
Ark Trust International Award: Daily Express (United Kingdom), for "Terrible Despair of Animals Cut Up in Name of Research," a two-part exposé on xenotransplantation.

Brigitte Bardot International Award: (ARTE), for a segment airing in France and Germany that shines the media spotlight on the abuse of U.S. rodeo animals.

Ark Trust International Award to Lucy Johnston and Jonathan Calvert of The Daily Express, United Kingdom, for "Terrible Despair of Animals Cut Up in the Name of Research."
