= Chai Patel =

British businessman

Chaitanya Patel CBE FRCP (born 14 September 1954) is a British doctor, businessman and philanthropist. Born in Uganda to Indian parents, he obtained medical qualifications at the University of Southampton in 1979 and previously worked in the National Health Service. He currently is Chairman of Elysian Capital an independent, private equity firm specialising in investing in the UK lower mid-market in deals of between £10m and £100m, and Chairman of HC-One, a nursing home management company. In August 2019, Chai announced his plans to retire from HC-One the following year.

== Career in business ==
After working for some years at the Private Clients office of Lehman Brothers in London as part of a small team including Bruce Berkowitz, in 1988 he founded Court Cavendish, which was rapidly recognised as a high quality continuing care company. In 1996 he merged it with Takare to create Care First, the UK's largest continuing care company. He remained as Chief Executive until it was taken over by Bupa in 1997. In 1999 he acquired and became Chief Executive of Westminster Health Care plc, the largest publicly quoted healthcare services group in the UK, which acquired Priory Hospitals in 2000. After a management buyout of the Care Home division in 2002, Patel continued as Chief Executive of the Priory Group, the UK's largest independent specialist mental health and education services group. On 5 March 2007 Patel and his management team resigned from Priory Healthcare.

In 2011, following the collapse of Southern Cross Healthcare, he re-formed Court Cavendish as a consultancy and joined with the landlord company NHP (Nursing Home Properties) to form HC-One, managing 249 of Southern Cross' former homes. Patel is on the Advisory Council of The Front Row Group of Companies. In January 2013, Patel became a trustee at the Bright Future Trust.

== Policy work and honours ==
For many years he has been involved in healthcare policy issues, working on numerous government task forces and action groups. He has received an honorary doctorate from the Open University. He is a keen supporter of Labour's private finance initiative and of private provision of NHS services. He was secretary to the Institute for Public Policy Research, a progressive think tank with close links to the Labour Party. In 1999 he was appointed a CBE for his services to the development of social care policies. In 2018, he joined a panel hosted by Knight Frank to discuss the future of the health and social care sector.

== Controversy ==
=== Westminster Health ===
Patel resigned as a trustee of Help the Aged in 2002 "to save it embarrassment" after a damning report into a nursing home owned by Westminster Health Care, which he headed.

=== Lynde House ===
In 2004, Patel was charged with serious professional misconduct and faced being "struck off" over complaints about poor care at Lynde House, one of his former care homes for the elderly. In June 2005, the case was dropped by the General Medical Council due to insufficient evidence.

Patel had been the subject of a sustained campaign against him and had maintained from day one that the charges against him were never supported by admissible evidence. This was supported when the High Court judge Mr Justice Collins stayed the case again Patel pending the judicial review hearing. He called the original charges laid against Patel a "rotten indictment".

On 15 June, with the consent of the group of residents' families, the High Court ordered that some of the charges should be struck out and that amendments intended to rectify deficiencies in other charges should be disallowed.

After the conclusion of the hearing, Patel said, "I am relieved that at last this terrible ordeal is over. My family and I have been through a great deal as a result of charges of serious professional misconduct which were never supported by any admissible evidence. I call today for the GMC to look at how it carries out its work".

In 2009, the NMC Professional Conduct Committee began its own investigation into whether the manager and deputy managers of Lynde House – Sarah Johnson and Lynette Maggs – were guilty of professional misconduct and negligence in relation to the earlier accusations of poor care at the residential home. In December 2011, the committee ruled that they were guilty of misconduct. While it decided not to take any formal sanctions such as registration penalties, in part due to the time elapsed since the original allegations were made, Johnson and Maggs were nevertheless left with a misconduct ruling against their names, and decided to appeal against the decision at the High Court by way of judicial review.

On 18 July 2013, at a judicial review, High Court judge Mr Justice Leggatt concluded "a decade after this misconceived and mismanaged case was brought against the registrants, their names are clear", referring to the NMC case against the manager and deputy manager of Lynde House. The judgment went on to criticise the NMC's handling of the procedure stating that it was a "case study for how a disciplinary case should not be conducted".

Later in 2013, the Health Select Committee expressed its concerns over the length of time the NMC's disciplinary process takes. Patel cited the NMC's handling of Lynde House, in an article by The Guardian newspaper, commenting, "the NMC must act to ensure the decade of trauma that Maggs and Johnson endured never happens again. They were good people, doing a good job, who had their careers and lives needlessly and unjustly blighted".

=== Cash for peerages ===
Patel is a donor to the British Labour Party, having given the party £100,000. In March 2006, it was revealed that Patel, a Labour nominee for a life peerage, had made a loan of £1.5m, at commercial rates, to the Labour Party in summer 2005. The House of Lords Appointments Commission, which vets nominations for peerages, was reported to be against Patel's candidacy. Patel said that he made the loan following a request, but never expected anything in return. The Labour Party defended the loan, asserting that no rules had been broken. Patel's name was submitted by Downing Street for a peerage two months after the loan.

The BBC quoted him as saying, "[I have] been angered by what [I see] as the leaking of [my] candidacy by the commission" and he has called for greater transparency. He also said that he would not have loaned the party the money if he had imagined that the financial support would create such criticism. Further concerned that his reputation was being traduced, he made a strenuous plea for clarity in the handling of his candidacy on BBC2's Newsnight on 10 March 2006 and in a letter to the HLAC stated that he was mystified and deeply distressed by the apparent rejection.

On 15 March 2006, it was revealed that Jack Dromey, the Treasurer of the Labour Party, had been unaware of the loans and called for an independent inquiry.

On 29 March 2006, Patel withdrew his name from the list of nominees for a peerage. He said that at no time did he have any expectation of a reward nor had he been offered anything in return, yet on BBC Radio 4's Today programme he expressed the view that he wanted to serve in the upper house as he felt that his life experience ensured that he could make a valuable contribution there.
