= Centre for Investigative Journalism =

The Centre for Investigative Journalism
- Founded: April 2003
- Founders: Gavin MacFadyen; Michael Gillard; Brian Basham; Simon Albury
- Type: Registered UK Charity
- Purpose: Advance education for, and public understanding of; investigative journalism, critical inquiry, and in-depth reporting and research.
- Location: London
- Region served: United Kingdom
- Key people: Isabel Hilton (Chair); James Harkin (Director)
- Website: tcij.org

The Centre for Investigative Journalism (CIJ) is a British independent charity providing training to journalists, researchers, producers and students in the practice and methodology of investigative journalism. It was incorporated as a Company Limited by Guarantee in June 2005 and registered as a Charity in March 2007 by founders Gavin MacFadyen, Michael Gillard, Brian Basham and Simon Albury. Using grants from the Lorana Sullivan Foundation, the CIJ organises annual three-day summer conference and courses in data journalism and investigative techniques. It has provided training to thousands of journalists, researchers and students from over 35 countries. The CIJ is based at the School of Journalism at Goldsmiths, University of London, which has held the CIJ summer conference each year since 2014.

The Centre supports and encourages Freedom of Information, Computer Assisted Reporting, and the protection of whistleblowers. The CIJ offers particular assistance to those working in difficult environments where free speech and freedom of the press are under threat and where truthful reporting can be a dangerous occupation. The CIJ's training programmes are designed to encourage in-depth reporting on injustice, corruption, the integrity and transparency of institutional power and to hold the powerful to account. This work has been supplemented by publication of Logan handbooks on investigative methods and techniques and mentoring journalistic youth groups and young filmmakers.

The CIJ's supporters include reporters from the BBC Radio and Television, Canal Plus (Paris), CBS 60 Minutes, Channel Four, Private Eye, The Sunday Times Insight Team, The New York Times, and WikiLeaks.

In 2007 the CIJ acquired registered charity status and attracted support from a number of foundations including the Open Society Institute, the David and Elaine Potter Foundation, the Ford Foundation, the Park Foundation, the Reva and David Logan Foundation, Democratie en Media, Goldsmiths, University of London, and several smaller private trusts.

In 2009, the CIJ was instrumental in helping to found the Bureau for Investigative Journalism, an independent, foundation-supported producer of in-depth reporting in defence of the public interest.

In 2012, the CIJ instituted a programme of active pro bono assistance, counselling and defence to whistleblowers and those who have exposed crimes and wrongdoing in their workplace.

The CIJ recently launched a programme on information security, organising workshops for journalists, researchers and lawyers on encryption, Tor, OTR and other protective technologies. In 2014, the organisation also began a series of conferences which bring together journalists, technologists and hacktivists to forge alliances against mass surveillance and censorship. These events are titled the CIJ Logan Symposia.

In 2020, the Centre organized a Spanish-language training program for Latin American journalists and other investigators, to help improve their investigative skills and analyze common problems they might face when investigating corruption, environmental harm or other misconduct affecting the public interest. By 2022, they had partnered with 3 Latin American enterprises—Instituto Prensa y Sociedad (IPYS), Fundación Connectas, and Fundación Gabo—to deliver the training program.
