= Priory Group =

British mental health care provider

The Priory Healthcare Logo

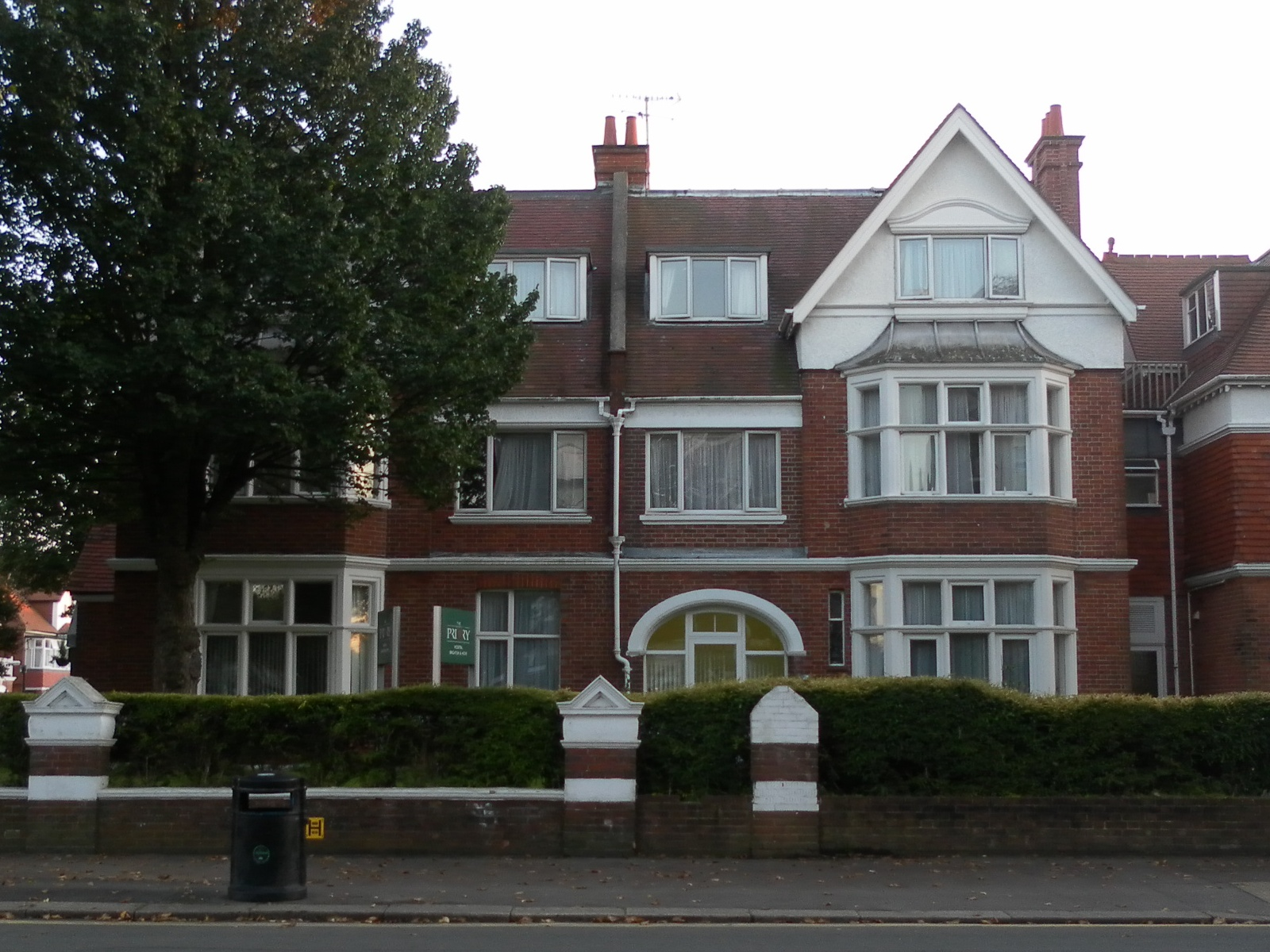
Branch of The Priory in Hove

Priory is a provider of mental health care and addiction rehabilitation facilities in the United Kingdom. The group operates at more than 500 sites with over 7,000 beds. Its flagship hospital is the Priory Hospital, Roehampton, which is best known for treating celebrities particularly for drug addiction. The Priory also manages schools, some for students with autism spectrum disorders through Priory Education and Children’s Services. Some of its facilities are run by its subsidiary Partnerships in Care. In January 2019 it opened its first overseas school in partnership with the Abu Dhabi Department of Education and Knowledge.

== Ownership ==
In 1980 the Priory Hospital in Roehampton was acquired by Community Psychiatric, an American healthcare company, and became the first clinic in what was to become the Priory.

Priory was the subject of a management buyout, funded by Mercury Asset Management and several banks, in 1994.

In 2000 Westminster Healthcare Group (a company owned by Dr Chai Patel) acquired Priory Hospitals from the management team and from Mercury Asset Management for £96 million.

In 2002, the company was the subject of another management buyout, this time led by Doughty Hanson & Co, for £289 million. The company was divested to ABN AMRO (later acquired by the Royal Bank of Scotland Group) in July 2005 for £875 million, netting the five company directors over £50 million.

Advent International took control for an aggregate consideration of £925 million in 2011.

In October 2014, former Chief Executive, Tom Riall announced that the group was planning a significant expansion into the mental health community services market and would bid in partnership with “incumbent” NHS providers, an approach that would allow them to come up with new models of care. Anticipating more services to be put out to tender by Clinical commissioning groups, he noted that Priory could contribute "considerable commercial bidding expertise” and become the “overflow provider of choice” for the NHS.

Acadia Healthcare bought the business for £1.3 billion in January 2016 and sold it to Waterland Private Equity for £1.1 billion in January 2021. Waterland plans to join it with MEDIAN of Germany "to create Europe’s leading rehabilitation and mental health services provider", especially in neurology and other post-acute services.

In 2022, The Times reported that the healthcare chain faced "spiralling rental bills" for its hospitals after its new owner Waterland agreed an £800 million sale and leaseback deal of 35 Priory healthcare facilities to Medical Hospitals Trust. The group considered increasing prices for care because it anticipates higher costs, including from rents, which are now subject to annual inflation-based escalators.

In 2023, the Priory's loss before tax climbed sharply to £72.4 million from £16.9 million. According to its most recent accounts, the company reported a negative equity value of £203 million.

In 2023, a British Medical Journal research paper found that healthcare provided by private equity-backed companies like the Priory was often more expensive and had "mixed to harmful impacts on quality".

In 2024, Viceroy Research, a financial investigations research group, examined the sale-leaseback deals of the Priory's landlord MHT and accused it of falsely presenting the Priory as “a well capitalised and profitable machine” despite accumulating losses while under private equity ownership". In a report, Viceroy found that the Priory has been "operationally loss-making for years and relies on the proceeds of sale-leaseback transactions to remain solvent" and that "Medical Properties Trust's (MPT) assertions about the solvency of its tenants are fairy tales told to shareholders and analysts. MPT's rent roll is almost exclusively distressed and management continues to portray these tenants as not only a going concern but a sound investment".

== Deaths in Priory care ==
An investigation by The Times found that the number of reported deaths, including those from natural causes, in Priory facilities rose by 50% between 2017 and 2020. In 2021, NHS England, which contracts the Priory for over £400 million in mental health care contracts annually, criticised the group's chief executive for "repeated service failures" and complained that safety had not improved despite meetings with the Priory over the preceding two years. In 2022, the Care Quality Commission identified that Priory hospitals faced criticism over the care related to at least 30 patient fatalities.

The director of the INQUEST charity, Deborah Coles, said the "shocking death toll across Priory services continues" with "repeated systemic failings to protect the lives of people" in its care.

After the suicide of a 14-year old girl, Amy El-Keria, funded by the NHS, at the group’s Ticehurst House hospital in East Sussex in 2012, a prosecution was brought by the Health and Safety Executive. The company pleaded guilty to a charge of being an employer failing to discharge its duty to ensure people were not exposed to risk. It faced a fine of at least £2.4 million. The inquest jury found that the staff had failed to dial 999 quickly enough, had failed to call a doctor promptly and were not trained in CPR.

Its hospital in High Wycombe, a 12-bed low-security unit for young people with learning disabilities or autism, which opened in April 2018 was closed in February 2019 after the Care Quality Commission rated it inadequate and said the staff lacked appropriate experience and skills. The company said that it could not recruit "an experienced, settled team of core nursing and clinical staff.” The CQC rated three units run by Priory inadequate.

In 2012, a patient went missing from the Priory Roehampton and shortly afterwards stood in front of a train. The Coroner concluded that "there were gross failures in his care, notably the failure to perform basic observations, followed by a deliberate falsification of the record".

A teenage patient at the Priory Cheadle Royal Hospital took her own life in her room in 2014. The inquest heard that the hospital had "no coherent policy on how or how regularly observations should be conducted". The coroner wrote to the Priory chief executive to express concern at the "deplorable practice" of inadequate record keeping.

A patient at the Chadwick Lodge mental health unit in Milton Keynes took his own life in 2015 when it was operated by the Priory. The coroner concluded that a failure to carry out proper observation checks "may have caused or contributed to his death".

A racehorse owner took his own life just days after being discharged from the Priory North London hospital where he had been sectioned for his own safety in 2018. The inquest found risk assessments were poor, discharge planning was inadequate and there was no crisis plan.

In 2018 a coroner at the inquest into the death of a teenage boy at the Priory North London hospital expressed concern at the "really serious failure" of staff to adequately monitor the boy and then falsify logs to appear as though they had. The Care Quality Commission rated safety and leadership on the wards as inadequate and risk management as ineffective.

A retired university lecturer took his own life at the Priory Hospital Altrincham in 2019 and the coroner at his inquest found that staff had written up his observation records to "give the misleading flavour of authenticity". He recommended the standardisation of observations across NHS and private hospitals.

Two Priory hospitals, Kneesworth House in Hertfordshire and Priory Hospital Blandford, were rated “inadequate” by the Care Quality Commission in July 2019. Admissions to Priory Hospital Blandford were suspended “until further notice”. The greatest problems at Kneesworth house were on the forensic wards. Ellingham Hospital, in Attleborough was rated inadequate in November 2019. According to Priory “the fundamental issue . . . was structural: there are simply not enough skilled staff in the region to meet the highly specialised needs of the young people at Ellingham”. 88.2% of its 93 mental healthcare facilities in the UK have received the equivalent of good or better ratings.

In 2020, a detained patient escaped over a garden fence at the Priory Hospital Altrincham and was found dead a few days later. The inquest jury found there was inadequate garden security and risk assessments, and staff failed to follow communication procedures and check essential handover information. The coroner issued a Prevention of Future Deaths Order and noted that the Priory knew that the garden fence was unsafe because previous patients had escaped over it.

A father of three killed himself at the Priory Arnold hospital in September 2020 after hearing voices and becoming fearful of discharge. Before his death, the Priory doctor had dismissed him as "malingering" to get better housing. At the inquest, the Coroner ruled that neglect by the Priory and contributed to his death. He said the case was "one of the worst examples of care provided to a vulnerable, mentally ill patient" and that the care he received was "seriously flawed".

In October 2021, safety problems and the incompetence of hospital staff at the Priory Hospital Kneesworth in Hertfordshire were reported by an undercover journalist in the documentary "Secure Hospital Uncovered (Exposure)" on ITV.

St John’s House near Diss in Suffolk, a 49-bed hospital for adults living with learning disabilities and associated mental health issues was put in special measures in March 2021 after the Care Quality Commission rated it inadequate and accused staff of failing to ensure patients’ safety or dignity.

In 2021, a female patient discharged herself from the Priory Roehampton hospital and was found dead a few days later. The Coroner issued a Prevention of Future Deaths Order and said "matters of concern" were that the Priory made no follow up appointment; did not contact her family after she left and did not try to contact the patient again for 10 days.

In April 2022, one of the UK’s leading forensic psychiatrists found that the Priory was responsible for two fundamental causes and 29 contributory factors of the death of a 23-year old NHS patient at Priory Hospital Woodbourne in Birmingham. At the inquest, the jury found that the death was "contributed to by neglect" by the Priory and a prevention of future death report was issued by the coroner. In this case, the Care Quality Commission decided that the failings of care were so severe that it launched a criminal prosecution of Priory Healthcare Ltd, which was convicted in March 2024 of exposing the patient to serious risk of harm at the Priory Hospital Woodbourne and fined £650,000, the biggest penalty in the company’s history. After sentencing, the patient’s father described the Priory as a "calculating, cruel and fundamentally dangerous company".

On Christmas Day 2022, a woman patient walked out of a secure ward at the Priory Arnold, near Nottingham, and was found dead on farmland on Boxing Day. The inquest jury said there had been communication failures from all parties, inadequate risk management, missed opportunities to mitigate absconsion risk and insufficient senior oversight". The month after the patient’s death, the CQC carried out an unannounced inspection and found care standards "totally unacceptable".

In 2022, a young mother died at the Priory Hospital Woking and the Coroner issued a Prevention of Future Deaths Order. The jury found risk assessments were not performed in line with policy; incomplete observations; little evidence of staff engagement with the patient; therapy notes were not acted upon, and there was a lack of continuity in her care.

In 2022, three young women died within two months of each other at the Priory Cheadle Royal hospital, near Manchester. An inquest jury found the first death was "contributed to by neglect" by the hospital. The jury said "serious inconsistencies existed across all levels of management in relation to her care plan" which resulted in the "inadequate care of a highly vulnerable patient." After the second death, the Coroner issued a Prevention of Future Deaths Order and said that there was "an over-reliance by the NHS on independent providers for mental health beds". After the third death the Coroner found that the hospital had given the patient so much medication that it resulted in profound sedation and the loss of her gag reflex. When the Care Quality Commission rated the Priory Cheadle Royal "inadequate" after the three deaths, Rebekah Cresswell, the Priory Chief Executive, responded saying she "disputed the factual accuracy of many aspects of the report". Less than four months later a fourth young woman died at the same hospital. The jury at her inquest concluded her death was caused by misadventure and the coroner called for urgent changes to mental health provision, warning that "unless something is different, there are going to be more deaths".

In November 2023, Priory Hospital Roehampton was criminally convicted and fined £140,000 for inadequate patient safety measures, which were highlighted following a woman's death under their care. A doctor at the hospital said there had been a "litany of basic errors" in her care and described the ward where she died as an "utter shambles".

== Notable patients ==
The following is alphabetical list of notable people whom The Priory has treated:

- Craig Charles, actor
- Richey Edwards, musician and songwriter
- Paul Gascoigne, footballer
- Michael Johnson, footballer
- Justin Hawkins, singer
- Steven Walters, footballer
- Ruby Wax, actress and comedian

== See also ==
- Private healthcare in the United Kingdom
