= Barchester Healthcare =

British care provider company

Coordinates: 51.5215°N 0.0874°W

Barchester Healthcare Ltd.
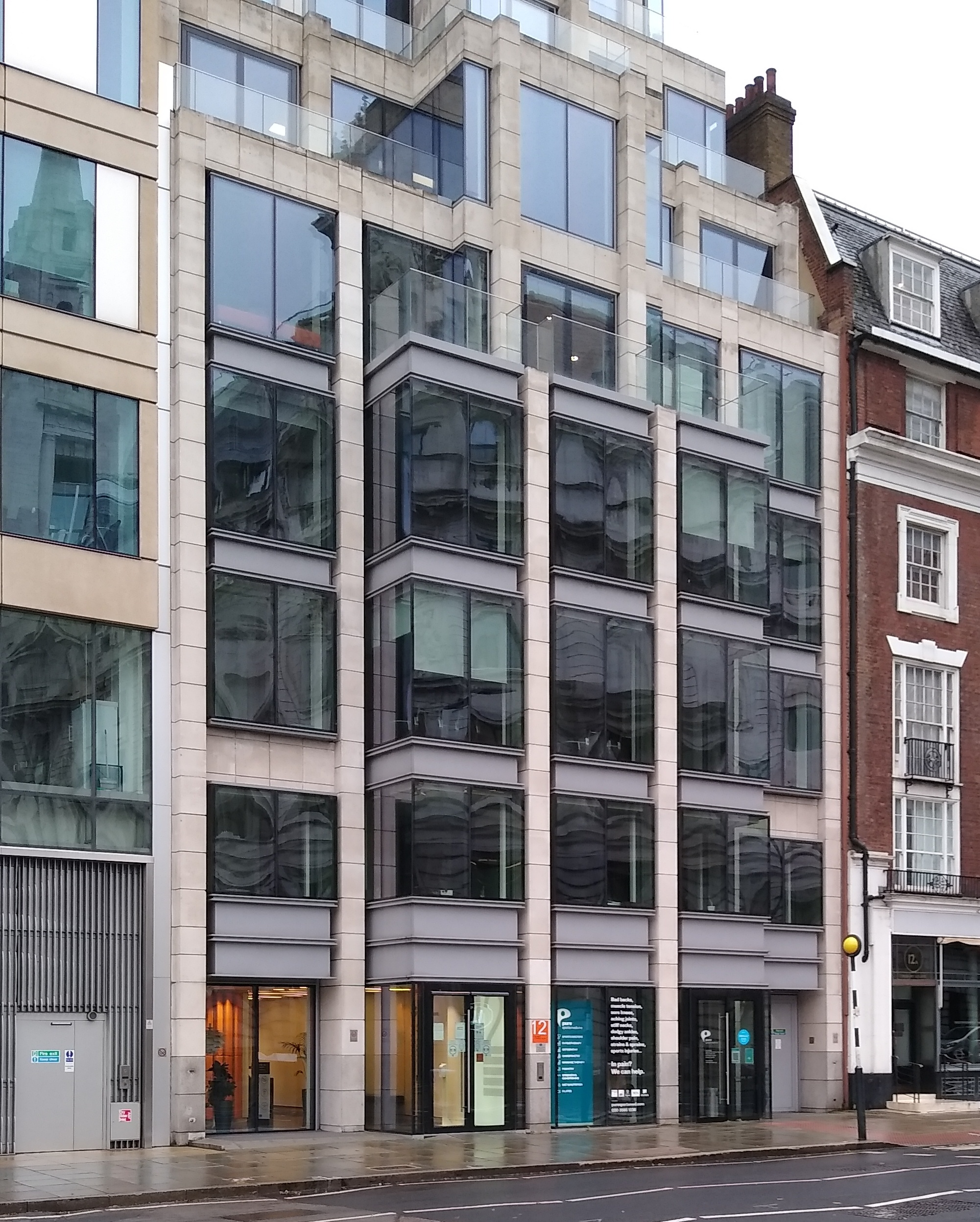
- Head office in London
- Industry: Health care
- Founded: 1992; 34 years ago
- Founder: Mike Parsons
- Headquarters: Finsbury Square, London, England
- Number of locations: 250 (October 2021)
- Website: www.barchester.com

Barchester Healthcare is a care provider in the United Kingdom set up in 1992. As of October 2025, the company operates 223 nursing homes and 14,500 hospital beds across the UK, predominantly in London and the southeast of England. It employs 16,250 people with its head office located in Finsbury Square, London. It also has offices in Berkhamsted, Oxfordshire, Milton Keynes, Wiltshire and Inverness Barchester Healthcare is considered one of the 'Big 5' UK later life care providers. It has over 13,000 beds available, and is third in terms of bed capacity behind HC-One and Four Seasons Health Care.

== History ==
Barchester Healthcare was founded in 1992 by Mike Parsons. After finding it difficult to find a good quality care home for two of his relatives, he bought Moreton Hill, a 17th-century farm in the Cotswolds, and converted it into a care home which he felt was of a sufficiently high standard. In 1994, Moreton Hill won the Care Home Design award at the Great South Western Care Awards and featured on BBC's Countryfile as an example of design sympathetically managed for a rural environment.

The next care homes to be opened by Parsons were Badgeworth Court Care Home and Hunters Care Centre in 1995. Barchester has continued to expand its portfolio through new builds and acquisitions and as of October 2021, it ran over 250 homes across the country, making it the third largest care-home group in the UK.

In 2001, Parsons pleaded guilty on behalf of the company to breaches of health and safety; a resident at the firm's Chalfont St Peter home had died.

In 2018 it was reported that Barchester Healthcare Ltd. was being put up for sale by Grove Investments, an investment company owned by three Irish businessmen, Dermot Desmond, J. P. McManus and John Magnier. It was reported that the asking price for the group, that turns over c.£600 million a year, was in the region of £2.5 billion.

It took over 14 care homes from Four Seasons Health Care in December 2019.

The chief executive, Dr Pete Calveley received a salary of £2.28 million in 2020. In response to criticism the company said 84.9% of Barchester’s services had been rated as ‘Good’ or ‘Outstanding’ by the Care Quality Commission - more than doubled during his time in the job.

It has five homes in Dorset, the newest, Parley Place, in West Parley opened in November 2022 has 68 ensuite rooms and charges from £1,350 a week.

In October 2025, the company announced it had been acquired by Welltower, an American real estate investment trust, for £5.2 billion. As part of the deal, it was announced that Barchester's management team will remain but its former owners will no longer be involved in the business.
