= Southern Cross Healthcare (United Kingdom) =

- Company type: Public (LSE: SCHE)
- Founded: 1996; 30 years ago
- Defunct: 20 June 2012 (insolvency agreed)
- Fate: insolvency
- Headquarters: Darlington, UK
- Services: health and social care
- Number of employees: 41,000 (2011)
- Website: www.schealthcare.co.uk

Southern Cross Healthcare (Group plc) was a private provider of health and social care services, predominantly through the provision of care centres for elderly and some younger people. The group was the largest provider of care homes and long term care beds in the United Kingdom, operating over 750 care homes, 37,000+ beds and employing around 41,000 staff. Following rapid expansion financed by the sale of leases of its homes, its shares fell 98% from early 2008 to early 2011, reducing its market value from £1.1bn to around £12m. It was listed on the London Stock Exchange and a constituent of the FTSE Fledgling Index. The company had severe financial problems in 2011 and declared insolvency the following year.

== History ==
The company was founded in 1996 by John Moreton, who was its chairman and chief executive until 2002. By 2002 "...it had 140 homes, was the third-largest of its kind in Europe and was heading for the stock market". In August 2002, the management backed by West Private Equity and Healthcare Investments Limited, acquired Southern Cross through an £80m management buy-out.

In September 2004, a secondary buy-out of the business by the management together with Blackstone Capital Partners followed, for £162m. Blackstone then acquired care home owner NHP (Nursing Home Properties) for £564m, which saw a competition investigation by the Office of Fair Trading. In November 2005, it also took over the Ashbourne Group of care homes, comprising 10,000 beds in 193 homes, for £85m.

Blackstone continued to grow the business under its pre-existing sale-and-leaseback strategy. Southern Cross Healthcare continued as a pure operating company, renting care homes from a number of landlord companies, including NHP which became its largest landlord. NHP was subsequently sold to investors.

In July 2006, the company was floated on the London Stock Exchange, entering the FTSE 250 Index in September.

== Closure ==
In 2007 and 2008 the Blackstone management team left and were succeeded by a new team led by William Colvin. However cracks soon began to appear and in early 2011 the company was in crisis as a direct result of an 8% reduction in occupancy. This equated to a decline in income of circa £52m. Given its upwards only rent bill (over £240m on its 750 properties) margins declined significantly creating pressure to pay landlords. With public spending cuts leading to fewer referrals (and a drop in occupancy rates from 92% to 84%), it was forced into negotiations with its landlords for rent reductions and appealed to the government for support. In early June 2011 it was announced that the company had made its own decision to withhold 30% of rent owed to avoid mass care home closure. Experts warned of a possible collapse into administration. Its shares had already fallen 98% from early 2008 to early 2011, reducing its market value from £1.1bn to around £12m.

By July 2011, attempts to rescue the company had failed, and all care homes were being taken over by their landlords. The largest landlord, NHP, owning 250 Southern Cross homes, hired Chai Patel to transfer management to HC-One, a company set up by his old consultancy Court Cavendish. The former CEO, James Buchan, waived his severance pay.

Media criticism focused on the split from the landlord entity, as the sale and leaseback strategy continued by Blackstone Group had crippled Southern Cross with an unsustainable business model. Blackstone denied responsibility, stating that the company had been in good order when it sold it five years previously and reaffirmed the 8% reduction in occupancy combined with an 11% increase in management overheads created the cash flow crisis.

The company declared insolvency in 2012.

== Orchid View inquest ==
Late in 2011, two staff at the company's Orchid View care home in Copthorne, West Sussex, were arrested on suspicion of ill-treatment and neglect of residents. The case had come to the notice of the authorities due to a whistleblower. A coroner's ruling in 2013 found that 19 deaths at Orchid View were unexplained, but stated that under Southern Cross' former management the home was "mismanaged and understaffed", and rife with "institutionalised abuse". A Serious Case Review was held. Managers closed the home in 2011; it was later renamed and reopened under new management.

== See also ==
- Eileen Chubb
