= Concordat between bodies inspecting, regulating and auditing health or social care =

- Type: Voluntary agreement
- Signed: 2004
- Original signatories: Audit Commission; Care Quality Commission (CQC) - from April 2009; Conference of Postgraduate Medical Deans (COPMeD); General Medical Council (GMC); Health and Safety Executive (HSE); Human Fertilisation and Embryology Authority (HFEA); National Audit Office (NAO); NHS Counter Fraud and Security Management Service (NHS CFSMS); NHS Litigation Authority (NHSLA); Postgraduate Medical Education and Training Board (PMETB); Skills for Health
- Language: English

The Concordat between bodies inspecting, regulating and auditing health or social care (2004) is a "voluntary agreement between organisations that regulate, audit, inspect or review elements of health and healthcare in England". It is made up of 10 objectives designed to promote closer working between the signatories. Each objective is underpinned by a number of practices that focus developments on areas that will help to secure effective implementation.

== Signatories ==
There are full and associate signatories to the concordat.

A similar agreement was concluded by bodies reviewing health and social care in Wales in 2005.

=== Full signatories ===
- Audit Commission
- Care Quality Commission (CQC) - from April 2009
- Conference of Postgraduate Medical Deans (COPMeD)
- General Medical Council (GMC)
- Health and Safety Executive (HSE)
- Human Fertilisation and Embryology Authority (HFEA)
- National Audit Office (NAO)
- NHS Counter Fraud and Security Management Service (NHS CFSMS)
- NHS Litigation Authority (NHSLA)
- Postgraduate Medical Education and Training Board (PMETB)
- Skills for Health

==== Former full signatories ====
- Commission for Social Care Inspection (CSCI) - until March 2009
- Healthcare Commission - until March 2009
- Mental Health Act Commission (MHAC) - until March 2009

=== Associate signatories ===
- Academy of Medical Royal Colleges
- Council for Healthcare Regulatory Excellence
- Department of Health
- Information Centre for Health and Social Care
- Healthcare Inspectorate Wales
- NHS Confederation
- Quality Assurance Agency for Higher Education
- United Kingdom Accreditation Forum
