= Special health authority =

A special health authority is a type of NHS body which provide services on behalf of the National Health Service in England. Unlike other types of trust, they operate nationally rather than serve a specific geographical area.

They are a type of "arm's length body" of the Department of Health of the United Kingdom, along with executive agencies and non-departmental public bodies (NDPBs). Special health authorities are independent, but can be subject to ministerial direction like other NHS bodies.

== Function ==
While special health authorities may provide services direct to the public, most are concerned with improving the ability of other parts of the NHS to deliver effective health care.

== Establishment ==
Special health authorities were set to provide a national service to the NHS or the public, under section 11 of the National Health Service Act 1977. Prior to the repeal of the whole of the 1977 Act by the NHS (Consequential Provisions) Act 2006, special health authorities included both infrastructure support organisations and national/specialist treatment providers such as the Special Hospitals Service Authority and the Bethlem Royal and Maudsley Special Health Authority. These direct clinical service providers were progressively merged with local NHS trusts and consequently with mainstream governance and funding arrangements.

The support special health authorities are now provided for under section 28 of the National Health Service Act 2006.

== NHS special health authorities ==
- NHS Blood and Transplant
- NHS Business Services Authority
- NHS Litigation Authority
- NHS Counter Fraud Authority, established 1 November 2017

== Former NHS special health authorities ==
- NHS Trust Development Authority until April 2016; became part of NHS Improvement
- Bethlem Royal and Maudsley Special Health Authority
- Health Education England until April 2015; became non-departmental public body
- Health Protection Agency until April 2005; became non-departmental public body
- Health Research Authority until January 2015; became non-departmental public body
- Information Centre for Health and Social Care until April 2013; became non-departmental public body
- Mental Health Act Commission until March 2009; succeeded by the Care Quality Commission
- National Institute for Health and Clinical Excellence until April 2013; became non-departmental public body
- National Patient Safety Agency until June 2012
- National Treatment Agency for Substance Misuse until April 2013; became part of Public Health England
- NHS Appointments Commission until October 2012
- NHS Counter Fraud and Security Management Service (Note: Became part of the NHS Business Services Authority in April 2006)
- NHS Dental Vocational Training Authority until April 2006; succeeded by the Committee of Postgraduate Deans and Directors
- NHS Direct until April 2008; converted to an NHS trust
- NHS Information Authority until April 2005
- NHS Institute for Innovation and Improvement until April 2013
- NHS Logistics until October 2006; joined forces with DHL to become NHS Supply Chain
- NHS Pensions Agency
- NHS Professionals Special Health Authority until April 2010; became government-owned company NHS Professionals
- Prescription Pricing Authority
- Special Hospitals Service Authority
