= Tom Hayhoe =

English businessman, health executive and regulatory chair (born 1956)

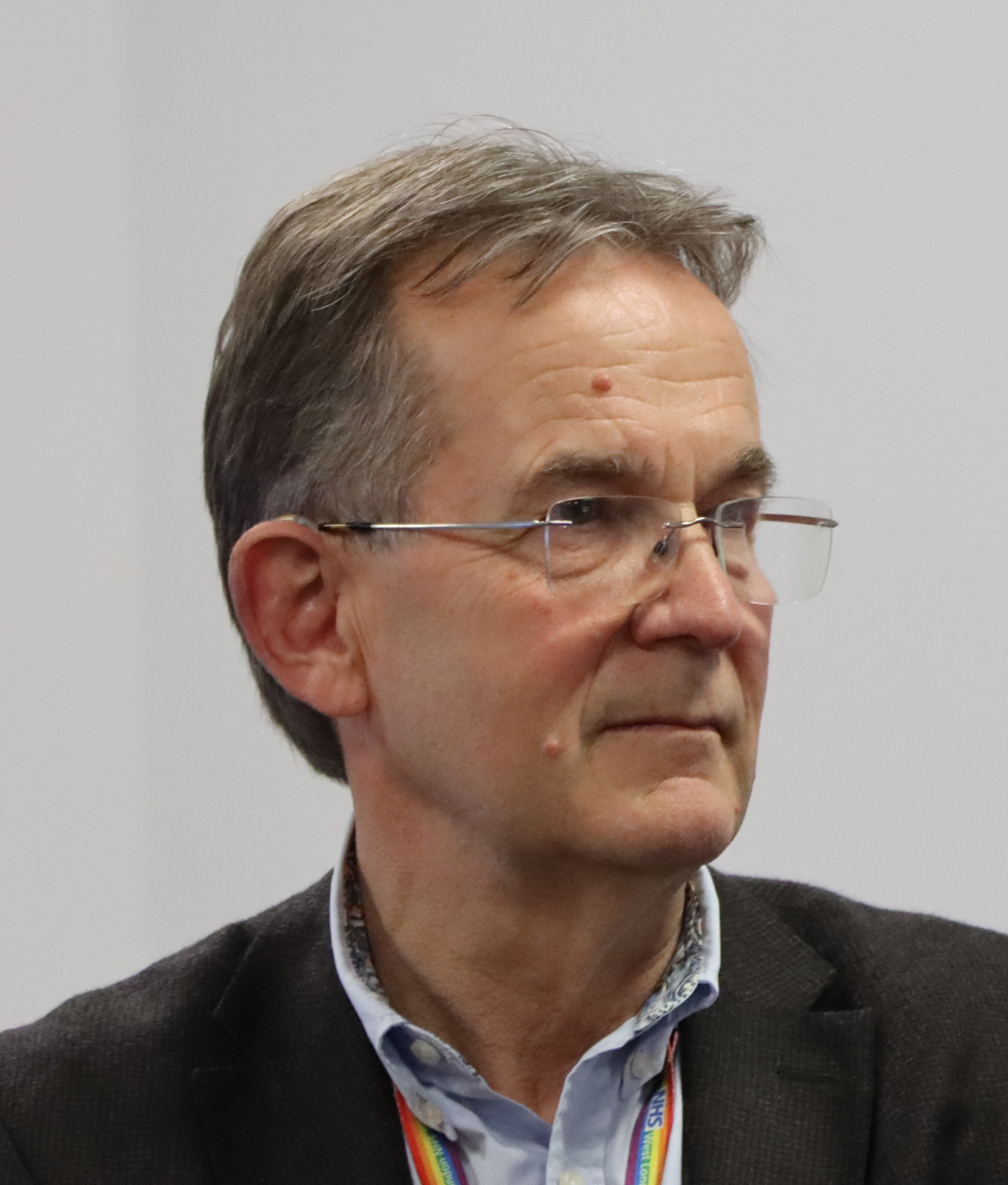
- Tom Hayhoe at West London NHS Trust in 2023

Chairman of NHS Counter Fraud Authority
- Incumbent
- Assumed office 1 May 2026
- Preceded by: Dame Linda Pollard

Covid Counter-Fraud Commissioner
- In office 3 December 2024 – 2 December 2025

Chairman of Legal Services Consumer Panel
- Incumbent
- Assumed office May 2024
- Preceded by: Sarah Chambers

Chairman of Taxation Disciplinary Board
- Incumbent
- Assumed office February 2024
- Preceded by: Susan Humble

Chairman of West London NHS Trust
- In office April 2015 – March 2023
- Succeeded by: Elizabeth Rantzen

Chairman, West Middlesex University Hospital NHS Trust
- In office October 2010 – March 2015
- Succeeded by: Nicholas Gash

Personal details
- Born: 3 March 1956 (age 70) Droxford, Hampshire, England
- Party: Conservative (until 1981); SDP (1981–1987)
- Spouse: Natalie Jobling
- Education: University of Cambridge; Stanford Business School
- Occupation: Chairman

Thomas Edward George Hayhoe (born 3 March 1956) is a chair of regulatory bodies and health sector organisations, and a former businessman, politician and offshore racing sailor. He has lived in Hammersmith in West London since 1982.

== Early life ==
Hayhoe's childhood was spent on the Isle of Portland, where he attended primary school before secondary education at Woodroffe Comprehensive School in Lyme Regis and St Paul's School in London. He studied history at Corpus Christi College, Cambridge, achieving a double first, and received an MBA from the Stanford Graduate School of Business, which he attended on a Harkness Fellowship.

== Commercial career ==
Hayhoe worked as a management consultant with McKinsey & Company before joining W H Smith as Head of Group Planning and Development and later working as a merchandise director in its main retail chain. He then worked with the Ashridge Strategic Management Centre and as an advisor to Coopers & Lybrand before establishing The Brackenbury Group in 1994 as a vehicle to provide management consultancy services and undertake management buy-ins. This was subsequently expanded into retail and consumer consultancy The Chambers.

In the mid-1990s he was a non-executive director of SLSS (Oyez Stationers). Between 2000 and 2002 he chaired the board of video games retailer Gamestation through a period of growth that took it from 26 to 70 outlets and negotiated its sale to Blockbuster.

== Public service ==
In 1985 he became a lay member, then non-executive director and finally deputy chairman of health authorities covering the boroughs of Ealing, Hammersmith and Fulham, and Hounslow in West London, serving until 2000. He subsequently chaired the West London Pathology Consortium (a collaboration between a number of acute hospitals in West London), the North West London sub-committee of the Advisory Committee for Clinical Excellence Awards, and Building Better Health West London (a Local Improvement Finance Trust company building community and primary care facilities for the NHS) and worked as a director of MediHome Limited.

He was appointed Chairman of West Middlesex University Hospital NHS Trust in October 2010 and a Trustee of Versus Arthritis (formerly Arthritis Research UK) in 2012. and in 2015 became Chairman of West London Mental Health NHS Trust (renamed West London NHS Trust in 2018) which is responsible for local inpatient and community mental health services in the London boroughs of Ealing, Hammersmith and Hounslow and nationally commissioned high security psychiatric services including Broadmoor Hospital.

Following the establishment by the Government of Jersey of an Advisory Board for the Crown Dependency's Health and Community Services in 2023, Hayhoe was appointed as its first permanent chair but departed after little more than a month citing differences in working style with the Jersey government minister, Deputy Tom Binet only days after announcing plans to spend taxpayers' money efficiently, make the system more transparent and improve the board's engagement with the public.

In December that 2024 he was appointed Covid Counter-Fraud Commissioner in HM Treasury on a one-year contract to examine an estimated £7.6 billion of Covid-related fraud with a remit stretching beyond disputed PPE contracts to include spuriously received business support loans and grants; erroneously claimed furlough payments; and abuse of the Eat Out to Help Out scheme. His report, Pursuing Recoveries, Preventing Reoccurence was published on 9 December 2025. In April 2026 the Department of Health and Social Care announced his appointment as chair of the NHS Counter Fraud Authority.

Hayhoe has worked extensively in regulatory roles alongside his other appointments, serving as an executive reviewer for the Care Quality Commission and an external assessor for the College of Policing, a tribunal chair for the Nursing and Midwifery Council and the Association of Chartered Certified Accountants, and chair of the Taxation Disciplinary Board and the Legal Services Consumer Panel of the Legal Services Board.

== Politics ==
Whilst studying at the University of Cambridge, Hayhoe served as chairman of the university branch of the Tory Reform Group, was a member of the standing committee of the Cambridge Union Society, and following graduation served as president of Cambridge Students' Union.

Hayhoe was a research assistant and adviser to Conservative Party cabinet minister Peter Walker before joining the Social Democratic Party (SDP) in 1981 with seven other leading younger members of the Conservative Party, including Adair Turner and Anna Soubry. Having studied health policy and economics under Professor Alain Enthoven while at Stanford, Hayhoe joined the group that developed health policy for the party.

At the 1987 general election he contested Wycombe as an SDP candidate.

== Personal life ==
Hayhoe has written and spoken extensively about the challenges he has faced living with tinnitus and hearing loss since his thirties. In 2020 he was co-founder and first chair of the Disabled NHS Directors Network.

He has competed at national and international levels in a variety of dinghy, keelboat and offshore classes, including Firefly, 470, National 12, International 14, J/24, Laser, Laser 5000, Sigma 33, Prima 38, SB20 and Class 40, and J/105. He served as commodore of Ranelagh Sailing Club and Vice Commodore of the Royal Ocean Racing Club and as chair of the Royal Yachting Association Tribunal.
