= Sense, The National Deafblind and Rubella Association =

British charitable organization

- Trade name: Sense
- Formerly: The National Deafblind and Rubella Association
- Industry: Non-profit
- Headquarters: 101 Pentonville Road, N1 9LG, London, UK
- Key people: James Watson O'Neill (CEO)
- Revenue: GBP £69.87million (2020)
- Number of employees: 2,446
- Website: https://www.sense.org.uk/
- Footnotes; Sense annual report and accounts: https://register-of-charities.charitycommission.gov.uk/charity-search/-/charity-details/289868/accounts-and-annual-returns

Sense is a charitable organization based in the United Kingdom. The charity exists to support people who are deafblind or who have a hearing or vision impairment and another disability and campaigns for the rights of disabled people in the UK. It operates in England, Northern Ireland and Wales.

Founded in 1961, the charity's full name is Sense, The National Deafblind and Rubella Association but its operating name is Sense. It was previously called The National Deafblind and Rubella Association.

== Charitable services ==
The charity offers a range of services for disabled people including residential services, advice and information and arts and sports activities. It also offers education services to young people with complex learning disabilities. It also provides a residential holiday scheme for disabled children. Sense also supports people in the UK affected by Usher syndrome.

== Campaigning and advocacy work ==
Sense also campaigns for the rights of disabled people to take part in life.

=== General Election 2024 - The disabled people's vote ===
In 2024, Sense campaigned to get more disabled people to vote, highlighting the major issues they wanted tackled by the next UK government. Example issues include - give every disabled child equal access to education, making the benefits system work for disabled people and tackling barriers to work.

A report found that nearly a quarter of people with complex disabilities felt elections weren’t run in a way that made it easy for them to vote.

=== Give carers a break ===
In 2023, with a third of family carers stating they do not have enough support to give them a rest, Sense launched the Give Carers A Break campaign, calling for greater investment in respite services to support family carers.

=== Cost of living ===
From 2021 through to 2023, Sense campaigned on the cost-of-living crisis, calling for more support for disabled people. Research showed that disabled households were disproportionately impacted by rising process. Sense delivered direct support with emergency payments of £500 to families to help them cover their bills.

=== Campaigning on exclusion and social isolation ===
In 2021, Sense campaigned to highlight the exclusion and social isolation of disabled people during the COVID-19 pandemic. The charity was also involved in highlighting the abuse of a woman and her deafblind sister for removing a face mask. Sense also published a report about exclusion and social isolation among disabled people that highlighted the barriers faced by disabled people in everyday life.

=== Sense Sign School ===
In 2020, the charity ran an educational campaign called Sense Sign School to increase understanding of British Sign Language (BSL). This campaign promoted free online lessons in BSL taught by a teenager living with CHARGE syndrome.

=== Campaigning on exclusion and social isolation ===
In 2018, Sense campaigned for local authorities to support families caring for disabled loved-ones to ensure they long-term plans in place for their care. This followed research highlighting that that three-quarters of family carers have no plans for what will happen when they can no longer look after their loved ones. In a news report, BBC disability correspondent Nikki Fox met with a family that Sense supports, highlighting a survey carried out by The Charity. The survey suggests three-quarters of family carers have no plans for what will happen when they can no longer look after their loved ones.

BBC Radio 5's Afternoon Edition report featured Charlie Beswick, mum of 12-year-old twin boys, Harry and Oliver. The report investigated what would happen to Harry when Charlie is no longer able to look after Harry. Sense supported Charlie to find the right support.

=== Children's play campaign ===
This activity included a 2016 campaign that highlighted that many disabled children were excluded from playgrounds and other children's play activities. This included an inquiry into children's play activities in the UK and a report called The Case for Play. The children's play inquiry was co-chaired by Lord Blunket, and covered by The Independent in Serina Sandhu's article 'Disabled children 'facing barriers' to play, inquiry finds.'

== Governance and regulation ==
Sense is a charitable company registered with the Charity Commission. It is also regulated by the Care Quality Commission, Ofsted (Office For Standards In Education) and Care Inspectorate Wales (CIW).

== Royal patronage ==
Princess Anne, the Princess Royal is the patron of Sense. In December 2020, Princess Anne was thanked for her work by a disabled teenager supported by Sense.

== Guinness World Record ==
Sense is notable for holding the world's largest tactile signing lesson. This took place in London on 2 October 2018 and involved 390 participants.
