= Healthcare Improvement Scotland =

National healthcare organisation for Scotland

- Formation: 1 April 2011
- Type: NHS board
- Headquarters: Edinburgh office: Gyle Square, 1 South Gyle Crescent, Edinburgh, EH12 9EB; Glasgow office: Delta House, 50 West Nile Street, Glasgow, G1 2NP
- Region served: Scotland
- Chair: Carole Wilkinson
- Chief executive: Robbie Pearson
- Staff: 427 FTE (2018/19)
- Website: www.healthcareimprovementscotland.org

Healthcare Improvement Scotland (HIS; Scottish Gaelic: Leasachadh Cùram Slàinte na h-Alba) is the national healthcare improvement organisation for Scotland. It is a public body which is part of the Scottish National Health Service, created in April 2011.

== History ==
NHS Quality Improvement Scotland (NHS QIS) was established on 1 January 2003 as a special health board with a remit to improve the quality of healthcare in Scotland. Healthcare Improvement Scotland (HIS) was established by the Public Services Reform (Scotland) Act 2010, taking over the work of QIS and the regulatory functions, in regard to independent healthcare provision, previously conducted by the Care Commission, now renamed the Care Inspectorate. The first chair of HIS, serving from 2010 to 2018, was Dame Denise Coia.

The function of this body is to implement the healthcare priorities of the Scottish Government, in particular the Healthcare Quality Strategy of NHS Scotland.

== Units ==
Healthcare Improvement Scotland incorporates several organisations:

- Healthcare Environment Inspectorate
- Scottish Health Technologies Group
- Community Engagement
- Scottish Intercollegiate Guidelines Network
- Scottish Medicines Consortium
- Scottish Patient Safety Programme

=== Healthcare Environment Inspectorate ===
The Healthcare Environment Inspectorate (HEI) carries out safety and cleanliness inspections of healthcare services across NHS Scotland. The assessments and inspections are to ensure that healthcare services are meeting the required standards of care, that good practice is identified and that areas for improvement are addressed.

=== Community engagement ===
Community Engagement launched in April 2020, having formerly been the Scottish Health Council. It has a role to improve how the NHS in Scotland involves people in decisions about health services.

=== Scottish Intercollegiate Guidelines Network ===
The Scottish Intercollegiate Guidelines Network (SIGN) was formed in 1993 and develops and disseminates evidence based clinical practice guidelines. These guidelines contain recommendations for effective practice based on current evidence. SIGN aim to improve the quality of health care for patients in Scotland. Membership includes medical specialists, nursing, pharmacy, dentistry, professions allied to medicine, patients, managers, social services and researchers. In 2005 it became part of NHS Quality Improvement Scotland.

Guidelines are developed by multidisciplinary working groups with representation from across Scotland. Each Guideline has the preliminary conclusions and draft recommendations presented it to a wider audience for feedback before publication. After publication they are available for download free of charge.

More than 160 guidelines have been produced, with current guidelines available on their website.

=== Scottish Medicines Consortium ===
The Scottish Medicines Consortium (SMC) has the role of providing advice to NHS Boards and their Area Drug and Therapeutics Committees (ADTCs) about all newly licensed medicines.

It seeks to supply advice within 12 weeks of a new medicine being licensed to ensure that patients who could benefit can get access to the medicine as quickly as possible. The speed of the process has allowed the SMC to be compared favourably against the performance of the National Institute for Health and Care Excellence (NICE) which performs a similar role for the NHS in England and Wales. On one occasion, NICE was accused of incompetence by the Royal National Institute of Blind People (RNIB) for delaying issuing advice for England and Wales about a drug that had already been approved for use in Scotland by the SMC. New cancer drugs approved by the Consortium in 2018 are expected to increase acute drugs bills for health boards by about 9% in 2019.

=== Scottish Patient Safety Programme ===
The Scottish Patient Safety Programme (SPSP) was launched in January 2008 as a five-year programme. It had a primary aim to reduce mortality by 15 per cent and adverse events by 30 per cent across Scotland’s acute hospitals by the end of 2012.

In June 2012 a second phase of the programme was announced, with an aim to ensure that at least 95 per cent of people receiving care do not experience harm – such as infections, falls, blood clots and pressure sores.

The Pharmacy in Primary Care Collaborative is to run for two years from July 2014.

"The Scottish Patient Safety Programme, marks Scotland as a leader, second to no nation on earth, in its commitment to reducing harm to patients, dramatically and continually." Donald Berwick, president emeritus and senior fellow, Institute for Healthcare Improvement.

== See also ==
- Care Inspectorate (Scotland)
- Care Quality Commission
- Drug crisis in Scotland
- Healthcare Inspectorate Wales
- Regulation and Quality Improvement Authority (Northern Ireland)
