= Lantum =

Lantum, formerly Network Locum, is an English company based in Shoreditch, London producing a platform and suite of tools for healthcare organisations to find and manage their clinical staff.

== History ==
Lantum was started by Melissa Morris in 2012. who previously worked at the management consulting firm McKinsey & Company. Morris came up with the idea of Lantum in 2012 when she was working at McKinsey & Company and then at NHS London. She saw how expensive and wasteful the staffing industry was in healthcare and wanted to improve it. Lantum removes manual steps through automation and costs a fraction of a recruitment agency.

The business started out in 2012 as a blog for doctors and named #1 healthtech start up to watch. The business now works across staff types, UK-wide and can be used in any healthcare organisation.

In 2016 Network Locum changed their name to Lantum to reflect their strategy to becoming a software business rather than a labour marketplace. Their investors include Piton Capital, BGF Ventures, Samos and Beringea.

In November 2017, Lantum was selected by NHS England to join the NHS Innovation Accelerator, a program which highlights leading technologies within the NHS and helps them scale. It is said to have has saved the NHS £7.7 million and enabled more than 4.2 million GP appointments since 2012. The company claims it could save the NHS £1 billion every year by cutting out traditional recruitment agencies. It has expanded beyond GP practices to 13 hospitals and plans to cover more.

Lantum acquired Leicester-based rLocums in 2016 and popular GP invoicing tool Locum Organiser in 2017 to expand the product offering to its users. In 2018 it had 50 full-time employees.

In March 2022 20 of the NHS’s 40 integrated care systems had signed up to use the service. It raised $15 million investment. The COVID-19 pandemic in the United Kingdom increased pressure on staffing issues. Lantum was used not just for paid staff but for volunteers in the vaccination centres.

== Recognition ==
Morris was named the "third coolest female startup founder in Tech" and one of the "Top 100 coolest people in Tech" by Business Insider in 2017. She has been invited to write about the difficulty of technical innovation in the NHS.
