= SBRI =

SBRI may refer to:

- Seattle Biomedical Research Institute, now Center for Global Infectious Disease Research
- SBRI Healthcare, a British healthcare innovation programme
