= Healthcare Commission =

Health regulator in England and Wales (2004–2009)

The Healthcare Commission was a non-departmental public body sponsored by the Department of Health of the United Kingdom. It was set up to promote and drive improvement in the quality of health care and public health in England and Wales. It aimed to achieve this by becoming an authoritative and trusted source of information and by ensuring that this information is used to drive improvement. The Commission was abolished on 31 March 2009 and its responsibilities in England broadly subsumed by the Care Quality Commission.

== History ==
The legal name for the Healthcare Commission was the Commission for Healthcare Audit and Inspection (CHAI). It was created by the Health and Social Care (Community Health and Standards) Act 2003. The Healthcare Commission took over the role of the Commission for Health Improvement (CHI) on the 1 April 2004 and also assumed some of the responsibilities of the National Care Standards Commission (NCSC) and the Audit Commission, as well as a number of additional functions.

The Commission's chairman was Professor Sir Ian Kennedy and its chief executive was Anna Walker. Peter Homa the Chief Executive of the Commission for Health Improvement was appointed as the first Chief Executive but resigned from the post at the request of the organisation's chairman Sir Ian Kennedy in April 2003.

The Health and Social Care Act 2008 replaced the Healthcare Commission, the Commission for Social Care Inspection and the Mental Health Act Commission with a single, integrated regulator for health and adult social care - the Care Quality Commission. The Care Quality Commission began operating on 1 April 2009 as a non-departmental public body.

== Functions ==
The Healthcare Commission had a role in promoting quality in healthcare through providing an independent assessment of the standards of services provided by the National Health Service (NHS), private healthcare and voluntary organisations in England. The commission also had the responsibility of coordinating organisations that inspect, regulate or audit health bodies. In order to do this, it established the Concordat between bodies inspecting, regulating and auditing health or social care. The Healthcare Commission aimed to promote improvement in the quality of NHS and independent healthcare across England and Wales.

The Commission's main statutory functions in England were:

- Assessing the management, provision and quality of NHS healthcare and public health services
- Reviewing the performance of all NHS trusts and award an annual performance rating to each trust
- Regulating the independent healthcare sector through registration, inspection, monitoring complaints and enforcement activities
- Publishing information about the state of healthcare in England
- Investigating serious failures in healthcare services
- Independently reviewing patients' complaints about NHS services that have not been resolved by the trusts involved
- Promoting the coordination of reviews and assessments carried out by the Commission and other regulatory organisations

The Healthcare Commission had a limited role in Wales, complemented by that of Healthcare Inspectorate Wales, which is part of the National Assembly for Wales.

The ability to inspect all sectors, provide guidance and act if that guidance is not acted on was possible because the Healthcare Commission was independent of the government.

== Annual health check ==
For the first two years of its existence, the Healthcare Commission continued the annual reporting of NHS providers using star ratings where NHS trusts were awarded one, two or three stars based upon their performance measured against clinical targets.

From 2006, an "annual health check" replaced the star ratings assessment system and looked at a much broader range of issues than the targets used previously. It sought to make much better use of the data, judgements and expertise of others to focus on measuring what matters to people who use and provide healthcare services. Trusts had to declare their compliance with the core standards set out in Standards for Better Health, published by the Department of Health in 2004.

The overall aim of the new assessment of performance, and the information gained through the process, was to promote improvements in healthcare. The annual health check process was designed to use views of patients and users of services as well as robust data sources for the arms-length monitoring of clinical performance. This lessening of the target setting by Whitehall was in line with the light-touch strategy set out by Gordon Brown in his 2005 budget and compatible with the vision proposed by David Cameron at the 2006 Conservative conference. It also aimed to help people to make better informed decisions about their care, promote the sharing of information and give clearer expectations on standards of performance.

The new ratings effectively graded NHS organisations on the quality of services and use of resources with services deemed to be one of four levels: Weak - Fair - Good - Excellent. Trusts that met the clinical targets used in the previous star ratings achieved a rating of Fair. Good and Excellent ratings were awarded to organisations that could demonstrate that they had processes in place to improve their services.
