= Standards for Better Health =

Set of standards published by the United Kingdom Department of Health

Standards for Better Health were a set of standards for the National Health Service in England. The standards were set out by the Department of Health of the United Kingdom in a document of the same name published in 2004. NHS trusts had to declare their level of compliance with these standards to the Healthcare Commission annually as part of the commission's "annual health check". The standards were replaced from 2009/10 by registration criteria established by the Department of Health and Care Quality Commission, which took over from the Healthcare Commission on 1 April 2009.

== Domains ==
The standards were listed under seven headings or "domains", three of which focused on "patient experience":

1. Safety
2. Clinical and cost effectiveness
3. Governance (both clinical governance and corporate governance)
4. Patient focus
5. Accessible and responsive care
6. Care environment and amenities
7. Public health

== Standards ==
The standards were divided into 24 core and 13 developmental standards. Compliance with the core standards had always been mandatory but the approach taken by the Department of Health and Healthcare Commission with respect to the developmental standards varied.
