= Coia =

Coia is an Italian, English & Scottish surname. Notable people with the surname include:

- Angelo Coia (1938–2013), American football player
- Arthur Coia (1943–2025), American labor union leader
- Dame Denise Coia (1952–2020), Scottish psychiatrist and mental health advocate
- Emilio Coia (1911–1997), Scottish caricaturist
- Maximin Coia (born 1983), French pair skater
- Paul Coia (born 1955), Scottish television presenter and continuity announcer

== See also ==
- Gillespie, Kidd & Coia, Scottish architectural firm famous for their application of modernism in churches and universities
