= Social Work Inspection Agency =

The Social Work Inspection Agency (SWIA) was an inspectorate in Scotland between 2005 and 2011.

== History ==
It was established as an inspectorate in April 2005 by the Scottish Government to scrutinise all aspects of social services provided by Scottish local authorities. The SWIA was chaired by Professor Alexis Jay.

It was created to deliver a more systematic approach to the inspection of social work services. Reports were produced following each inspection, with the intention of making them public.

On 1 April 2011, under the Public Services Reform (Scotland) Act 2010, its responsibilities were taken over by Social Care and Social Work Improvement Scotland, which from 15 September 2011, adopted the simpler working name of the Care Inspectorate.

== See also ==
- Commission for Social Care Inspection, the equivalent organisation in England at one time
