= Academic Health Science Networks =

Academic Health Science Networks (AHSNs) are membership organisations within the NHS in England. They were created in May 2013 with the aim of bringing together health services, and academic and industry members. Their stated purpose is to improve patient outcomes and generate economic benefits by promoting and encouraging the adoption of innovation in healthcare. In 2019 the AHSNs were issued with a fresh five-year licence to continue their work.

== Background and history ==
A report in 2008 by Lord Ara Darzi noted that the NHS was poor at innovating, and suggested wider collaboration between industry, education and all aspects of healthcare. The NHS is one of the world's largest employers and with the UK's spending on healthcare at over £140b in 2010 or 9.6% of national GDP, it is a key component of the national economy. There is a generally recognised need to improve the NHS's ability to identify and adopt innovation.

AHSNs were first proposed by name in the 2011 report "Innovation Health and Wealth" by Sir David Nicholson, chief executive of NHS England, and launched by the Prime Minister, David Cameron. A request for expressions of interest was issued in June 2012 and, on 23 May 2013, the 15 designated AHSNs were announced. They are regional, with non-overlapping territories covering the whole of England.

AHSNs take their place in the "fragmented, cluttered and confusing" landscape of NHS innovation. As part of the "Sunset Review" a number of initiatives closed in 2013 including the NHS National Innovation Centre, NHS Institute for Innovation and Improvement, and Health Innovation and Education Clusters (HIECs). There is still a range of active initiatives including NHS Innovation Hubs, NHS Supply Chain Innovation and NHS Improvement.

== Funding ==
Core funding comes from NHS England and work was "in hand to identify the funding" when expressions of interest were invited. A briefing paper assumed funding to be in the region of £2 per head of population served. With a population averaging 3m people, a typical AHSN might have expected roughly £6m per AHSN per year. These figures reflect early expectations but were neither clarified nor confirmed with the designation announcement.

When contracts were signed with NHS England in November 2013, the 15 AHSNs shared around £60 million of funding.

== Operation and activity ==
Although their purpose is clear, the structure and approach of individual AHSNs is a matter for local decision. This is apparent in the contrasting approaches taken and the variety of opinions expressed by network founders.

As membership organisations, AHSNs do not have any direct authority over their members, but the Innovation Health and Wealth report states: "all NHS organisations will aspire to be affiliated to their local AHSN where the AHSN will operate as a gateway for the NHS on innovation and working with the life sciences industry on the evaluation, commercialisation and rapid adoption of health technologies". They will be seen to be successful if and only if they can demonstrably improve the rate of adoption of medical technologies and ICTs.

In April 2014, it emerged that NHS England's 2014–15 business plan showed that AHSNs would receive £53.6m that financial year, a 5 per cent cut on the previous year's budget. However, it represents a larger 23 per cent cut on the £70m NHS England announced in May 2013. A senior AHSN figure told the Health Service Journal that NHS England risked "castrating" the programme by cutting the budget and by a perceived lack of promotion of the networks. "They are trying to save a comparatively small amount of money [by cutting the budget] but in doing so they risk castrating the AHSNs. Commissioners are not going to sign up to us if they are thinking that we are not going to be around in two years' time".

In 2019, the AHSNs received a new five-year licence, running to 2023, funded by NHS England, NHS Improvement and the Office of Life Sciences.

== See also ==
- National Institute for Clinical Excellence
- National Institute for Health and Care Research
