= NHS Professionals =

UK organization that supplies temporary staff to the National Health Service

NHS Professionals supplies clinical and non-clinical temporary staff to the NHS and provides workforce services to health and care organisations. It operates a membership base of healthcare professionals (known as 'Bank Members') who work flexible shifts and longer-term placements at more than 130 acute and community NHS Trusts and other health and care organisations across the UK and the Channel Islands. The company reports its Bank Members worked 4.6 million shifts and provided 39 million hours of care in the 2021–22 financial year.

NHS Professionals was incorporated as a private limited company in 2008. It is now self-funding but remains wholly owned by the Department of Health and Social Care.

Its headquarters are at Breakspear Park in Hemel Hempstead, Hertfordshire, United Kingdom. It also has regional offices and on-site teams based at NHS Trusts across England.

== History ==
NHS Professionals was originally formed as a national staffing service in 2001 by the Department of Health in response to concerns about the cost and quality of temporary nursing staff in the NHS. Its formation also recognised that some NHS staff wish to work more flexibly.

Between 2001 and 2003, NHS Professionals services were provided via four host NHS Trusts. However, to reduce variation of performance across the Trusts, the Department of Health established NHS Professionals as a Special Health Authority in 2004.

In a further reorganisation, NHS Professionals was incorporated as a private limited company in September 2008, owned by the Department of Health. In 2016, the government decided to sell a 75% stake in NHS Professionals, but following considerable criticism the Minister of Health Philip Dunne announced on 7 September 2017 that these plans had been abandoned. Later in 2017, the Department of Health confirmed that NHS Professionals would remain in 'wholly public ownership'.

While NHS Professionals is owned by the Department of Health and Social Care, it is self-funding and no longer receives financial support from the department. It generates income from fees charged to Client NHS Trusts to manage their flexible workforce requirements and to cover operating costs. In 2021–2022, it returned an £18 million dividend back to the department as its sole shareholder.

In 2016, NHS Professionals launched two sub-divisions: Doctors Direct, a dedicated locum recruitment service, and NHS Professionals International, which recruits overseas nurses and midwives into the NHS. More recently it launched an 'Academy' to provide Members and Clients with education and training services.

== Organisation and Services ==
NHS Professionals' clinical Bank Members comprise UK nationals and professionals recruited overseas and include nurses, midwives, healthcare support workers, doctors, allied healthcare professionals, healthcare scientists and social workers. Non-clinical Bank Members include finance, estates and facilities, management, administration and clerical and information technology.

NHS Professionals also provides workforce services at scale to NHS Trusts, Integrated Care Systems and other health and care organisations. For example, its 'Managed Service Provider' function takes over operational management of a Client's temporary workforce requirements including recruitment and shift fill, training and compliance, reductions in private staffing agency costs, on-site support and communications and marketing.

== COVID-19 response ==
During the pandemic's peak phases between 2019 and 2021, NHS Professionals worked with the Department of Health and Social Care and NHS England and Improvement to deliver additional healthcare workers into the NHS [citation pending].

In March 2020 it launched a 'Rapid Response' service and reported that it recruited 20,000 healthcare workers into the NHS, drawn from its Bank Members and a pool of retired, trainee and private sector staff. It also reported that it recruited 10,000 staff for the Government's 'Test and Trace' programme, 17,000 people into the National Vaccination Programme and additional staff into NHS Nightingale Hospitals [citation pending].

== People ==
NHS Professionals employs approximately 1,150 corporate staff. Its chief executive officer is Nicola McQueen and its chairman is Dr Helen Phillips.
