= SBRI Healthcare =

British health programme

SBRI Healthcare is a programme based in Twickenham, established to support technological innovations that tackle unmet needs within the NHS. It awards development grants to innovative companies.

The programme started in 2008. From 2013/2014 to 2015/2016 it has been funded by NHS England and awarded an average of £17.5 million per year to small businesses in the UK. RAND Europe evaluated the programme in 2017. The successful companies reported obstacles to the uptake of their products, including resistance to innovation in the NHS, and complex and bureaucratic procurement systems. They needed resources to complete development and obtain regulatory approval.

It runs two rounds of funding competitions a year, managed by individual Academic Health Science Networks. Companies are invited to bid for to develop solutions for specific health needs. The successful companies generally get between £700,000 and £1 million each for developing and testing their products. There is a preparatory feasibility funding package.

My mhealth was awarded £1,059,107 for its COPD patient self-management, and patient management system in 2013.

PA Consulting Group produced a report on the SBRI in September 2018 which estimated that it had generated £30 million savings for the NHS by improved self care and reduced use of services. It supported 1,050 jobs in small companies, raised more than £179 million in funding and delivered 60 products to the market.
