= Mental Health Act Commission =

The Mental Health Act Commission was an NHS special health authority that provided a safeguard for people detained in hospital under the powers of the Mental Health Act 1983 in England and Wales. Mental health care is the only part of health care where patients can be treated under compulsion, and necessarily there are very clear legal requirements on hospitals and the other services involved - primarily local authority social services. The Commission was abolished on 31 March 2009.

== History ==
The Commission was established under the Mental Health Act 1983 and consisted of some 100 members (Commissioners), including laypersons, lawyers, doctors, nurses, social workers, psychologists and other specialists.

The Health and Social Care Act 2008 replaced the Healthcare Commission, the Commission for Social Care Inspection and the Mental Health Act Commission with a single, integrated regulator for health and adult social care - the Care Quality Commission. The Care Quality Commission began operating on 1 April 2009 as a non-departmental public body.

== Functions ==
The Commission was a monitoring body rather than an inspectorate or regulator. Its concern was primarily the legality of detention and the protection of individuals' human rights. In addition to a visiting programme, the Commission provided important safeguards to patients who lack capacity or refuse to consent to treatment, through the Second Opinion Appointed Doctor Service.

Its functions were:

- to keep under review the operation of the Mental Health Act 1983 in respect of patients detained or liable to be detained under that Act
- to visit and interview, in private, patients detained under the Mental Health Act in hospitals and registered nursing homes
- to consider the investigation of complaints where these fall within the Commission's remit
- to review decisions to withhold the mail of patients detained in the High Security Hospitals
- to appoint registered medical practitioners and others to give second opinions in cases where this is required by the Mental Health Act
- to publish and lay before Parliament a report every 2 years
- to monitor the implementation of the Code of Practice and propose amendments to Ministers

In addition, the Commission was encouraged by the Secretary of State to advise on policy matters that fall within the Commission's remit.
