= NHS Protect =

Former part of the NHS Business Services Authority of the United Kingdom

NHS Protect formed part of the NHS Business Services Authority of the National Health Service until 2017. It had responsibility in England for tackling fraud, violence, bribery, corruption, criminal damage, theft and other unlawful action such as market-fixing, and it had responsibility for tackling fraud in the NHS in Wales. It employed 160 people. NHS Protect was replaced by the NHS Counter Fraud Authority in April 2017.

== Theft ==
In July 2014 a former NHS employee, Trevor Cosson, was sentenced to five years in prison, following an investigation by NHS Protect. Cosson had defrauded the NHS of £2.2 million when he managed the payment systems for East Sussex Primary Care Trusts.

== Price fixing ==
In June 2013 the Daily Telegraph infiltrated reporters into the annual Pharmacy Congress to investigate malpractice in the market for Specials. These products are generally individually priced. In November 2013 the paper reported that "The prices of more than 20,000 drugs could have been artificially inflated, with backhanders paid to chemists who agreed to sell them" and that NHS Protect had mounted an investigation.

== Violence against staff ==
In November 2013 it was reported that the number of criminal sanctions taken in cases of violence against NHS Staff had risen from 1257 in 2011/2 to 1458 in 2012/3, a rise of 15.9%. There was a rise of 5.8% in total reported assaults from 59,744 in 2011–12 to 63,199 in 2012–13.
