= Cynthia Bower =

Former NHS manager and Chief Executive of the CQC

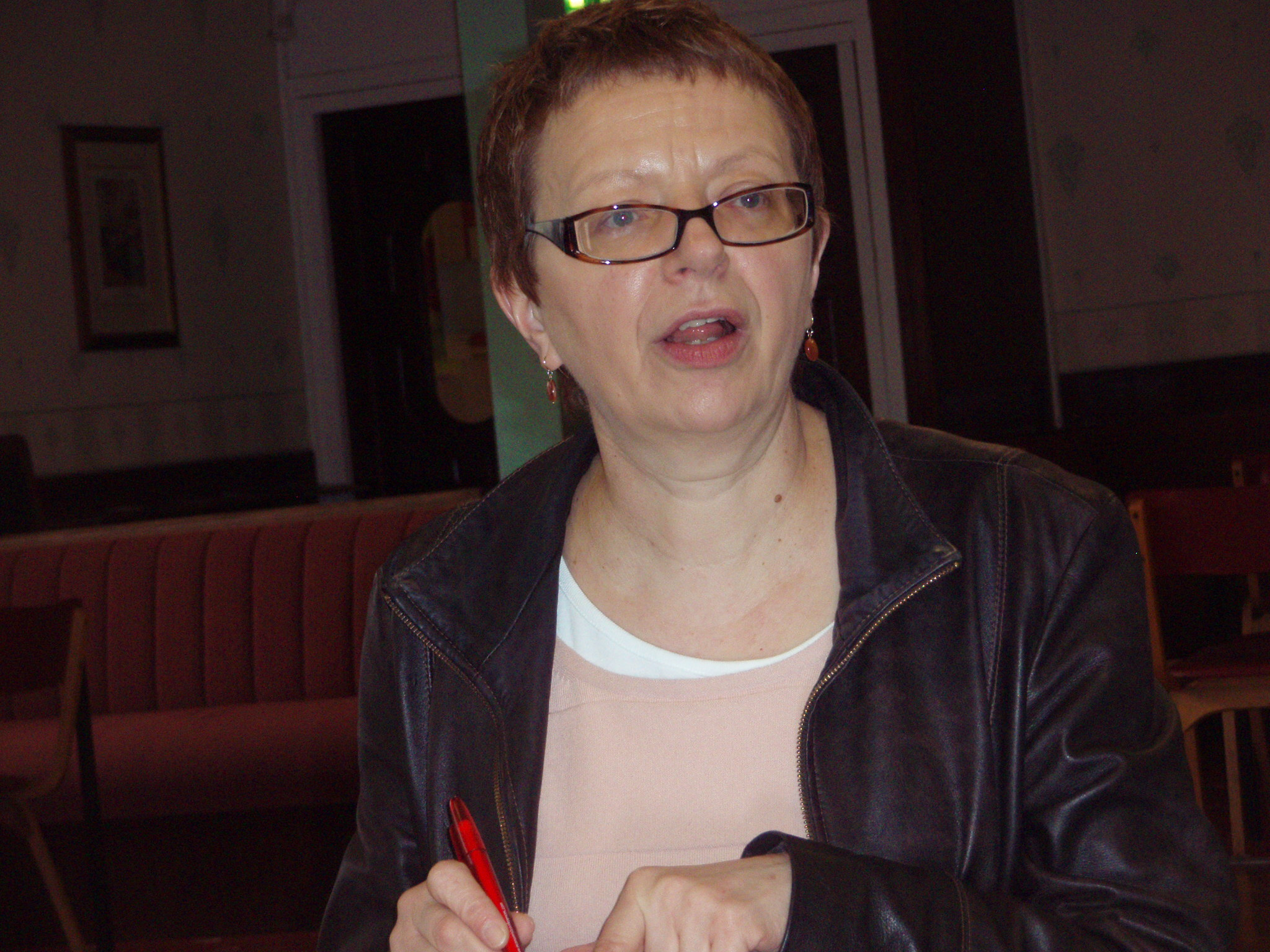
- Cynthia Bower 2010

Chief Executive of the Care Quality Commission
- In office July 2009 – September 2012

Personal details
- Born: July 6, 1955 (age 71)

Cynthia Bower (born 6 July 1955) is a former manager in the National Health Service, and the first Chief Executive of the Care Quality Commission (CQC) in the United Kingdom, from which she was forced to resign after the Winterbourne View hospital abuse investigation and a resultant investigation by the Department of Health.

== Early and personal life ==
Brought up in a village close to the coal mining district of Worksop, Nottinghamshire, she was the daughter of the local sub-postmaster. After being educated at Hartland comprehensive school, she then graduated from Birmingham University with an honours degree in English. Bower also has a master's degree in Social Sciences. Unmarried, Bower has an adult son.

== Career ==
=== Social worker ===
Bower trained as a social worker, working in children's services for 19 years. She rose to the position of Director of Social Services in Birmingham before leaving. She worked in children's services in Birmingham.

=== NHS Birmingham ===
In 1995 she moved to the NHS to work at Birmingham Health Authority as Director of Primary Care. In 2000 she became Chief Executive of Birmingham Specialist Community Health NHS Trust. In 2002 Bower became Chief Executive of South Birmingham PCT, then the largest PCT in the United Kingdom. In August 2005 she became managing director of Birmingham and the Black Country SHA, after the two merged.

=== NHS West Midlands ===
In July 2006, Bower became Chief Executive of the NHS West Midlands, a major regional strategic health authority which included responsibility for Stafford Hospital. NHSWM rejected the noted high death rates as a statistical blip.

=== CQC: 2009–2012 ===
In July 2009, the then Labour Government set up the Care Quality Commission (CQC) to replace three other quangos. Bower was appointed Chief Executive. The CQC oversees the NHS, social care and mental health, mandated to register and oversee 20,000 hospitals, care homes and clinics.

==== Winterbourne View ====
Winterbourne View was a private hospital at Hambrook, South Gloucestershire, owned and operated by Castlebeck. It was exposed in a Panorama investigation into physical and psychological abuse suffered by people with learning disabilities and challenging behaviour, first broadcast in 2011. One senior nurse had reported his concerns directly to CQC, but his complaint was not taken up. The public funded hospital was shut down as a result of the abuse that took place.

==== O'Brien report, resignation ====
In light of wider allegations, Una O'Brien, the then permanent secretary at the Department of Health was appointed to write a report on the CQC. On publication of the report in April 2012 in which Winterbourne View was cited, Bower was forced to resign when O'Brien concluded that "lessons need to be learned from the performance shortcomings of the early years." Bower stayed in-post until September 2012, and then retired.

==== Grant Thornton report ====
In August 2012, the new CQC Chief Executive David Behan commissioned a report by management consultants Grant Thornton. The report examined the CQC's response to complaints about baby and maternal deaths and injuries at Furness General Hospital in Barrow-in-Furness, Cumbria and was instigated by a complaint from a member of the public and "an allegation of a cover-up submitted by a whistleblower at CQC." It was published on 19 June 2013.

Among the findings, the CQC was "accused of quashing an internal review that uncovered weaknesses in its processes" and had allegedly "deleted the review of their failure to act on concerns about University Hospitals of Morecambe Bay NHS Trust." One CQC employee claimed that he was instructed by a senior manager "to destroy his review because it would expose the regulator to public criticism." The report concluded: "We think that the information contained in the [deleted] report was sufficiently important that the deliberate failure to provide it could properly be characterised as a 'cover-up'."

In June 2013, following a series of critical reports and facing 30 civil claims for negligence, it was announced that the organisation would be subjected to a public inquiry. David Prior, who was appointed CQC Chair in February 2013, admitted that the organisation was "not fit for purpose." Jeremy Hunt, the Secretary of State for Health, issued an official apology in the House of Commons for "the appalling suffering" of the 30 families involved.

On 20 June 2013, Behan and Prior agreed to release the names of previously redacted senior managers within the Grant Thornton report, who it is alleged had suppressed the internal CQC report. The people named were Cynthia Bower, deputy CEO Jill Finney, and media manager Anna Jefferson, who were all said by Grant Thornton to be present at a meeting where deletion of a critical report was allegedly discussed. Bower and Jefferson immediately denied being involved in a cover-up. In a later interview with The Independent, Bower accused the CQC of commissioning the Grant Thornton report that was neither fair nor reasonable and "against natural justice", but admitted that the CQC inspection whilst she was CEO had failed to uncover failings at Morecambe Bay trust: "We should have registered it with conditions."
