= NHS Counter Fraud and Security Management Service Division =

NHS division

The Counter Fraud and Security Management Division protects the staff, assets and resources of the National Health Service in England and Wales. Since 1 April 2006 it has been a division of the NHS Business Services Authority, a special health authority of the Department of Health of the United Kingdom. It was formerly known as the NHS Counter Fraud and Security Management Service (NHS CFSMS).

The NHS CFSMS comprises the NHS Security Management Service (NHS SMS) which develops strategy for improving security in the NHS, and the NHS Counter Fraud Service (NHS CFS), which implements policy on protecting NHS resources from fraud.

== NHS Counter Fraud Service ==
The NHS Counter Fraud Service was set up in 1998 as part of the Department of Health under the leadership of Jim Gee. The organisation set about discovering the scale of fraud against the NHS, what types of crime were involved and how much money might be being lost to the NHS. The next step was to set up an operational department to investigate cases of fraud and help the police and Crown Prosecution Service bring them to justice.

It was discovered that fraud was being carried out by patients, NHS staff and professionals and contractors. Examples included patients using false identities to gain large numbers of prescriptions for drugs, NHS staff members claiming for shifts they had not done, managers inflating expenses and contractors such as opticians and dentists claiming for services they had not provided.

From 1999 to 2006, it was estimated that counter fraud work in the NHS benefited the public purse by £811 million. This could pay for 53,000 kidney transplants or 35,000 nurses for a year.

Successes include the investigations into a general practitioner who did private work while off sick from the NHS, who was jailed for 12 months, a manager at a major hospital trust who was jailed for four years for creating fake employees in order to claim their salaries and a bogus psychiatrist who faked his qualifications, jailed for ten years. He lived a lavish lifestyle which included a 5 bedroom house, 30 Armani suits and a Ferrari. Under controversial plans, he was allowed back on duty and maintain the organisations £59 million budget.

The NHS Counter Fraud Service has also helped the NHS to fraud proof its systems leading to much lower rates of fraud than occurred in the past.

== NHS Security Management Service ==
The NHS Security Management Service was set up alongside the NHS Counter Fraud Service to build on the successes of the latter by extending the remit to security issues. As part of a new Special Health Authority the NHS SMS has begun to introduce the first ever national strategy for security in the NHS, which involves measures to protect staff in England against violence and abuse, prevent theft and damage to equipment and property, ensure the security of drugs and medicines and protect maternity and paediatric units.

The NHS SMS set about ensuring that every health body appointed a Local Security Management Specialist, trained and accredited by the NHS SMS, so that health bodies would be able to focus on the issues that affected them locally. In addition, the NHS SMS set up a Legal Protection Unit which provides cost effective legal advice to the NHS on pursuing sanctions against offenders and if necessary can pursue prosecutions. In 2004–2006, the rate of prosecution for people who assault NHS staff had gone up to 16 times what it had been in 2002-2003 (850 against 51), and increased again to 869 in 2006–2007.

In November 2007 it was revealed that there had been 55,709 physical assaults against NHS staff in England, 2,986 fewer than 2005–2006 and 4,586 fewer than 2004–2005.

In April 2004, the NHS SMS launched the biggest ever training programme in NHS history. Conflict Resolution Training aims to train 750,000 frontline NHS staff members in techniques to manage and prevent violence, looking at methods of communication, cultural awareness, environment and how to de-escalate violent situations as well as how to avoid being physically assaulted if de-escalation fails.

The NHS SMS has also contributed to trials of technology to help protect NHS staff and assets. This includes assisting with the Safer Hospitals Programme to develop environments which can help to reduce violence, and trialling a device for lone workers which will enable them to discreetly call for help to a response centre if in danger and give details as to their location, as well as recording evidence that can be used to prosecute offenders.

== See also ==
- Medicines and Healthcare products Regulatory Agency
- NHS Counter Fraud Authority
- UK Research Integrity Office
