= Denise Platt =

British civil servant (born 1945)

Dame Denise Platt DBE FRSA
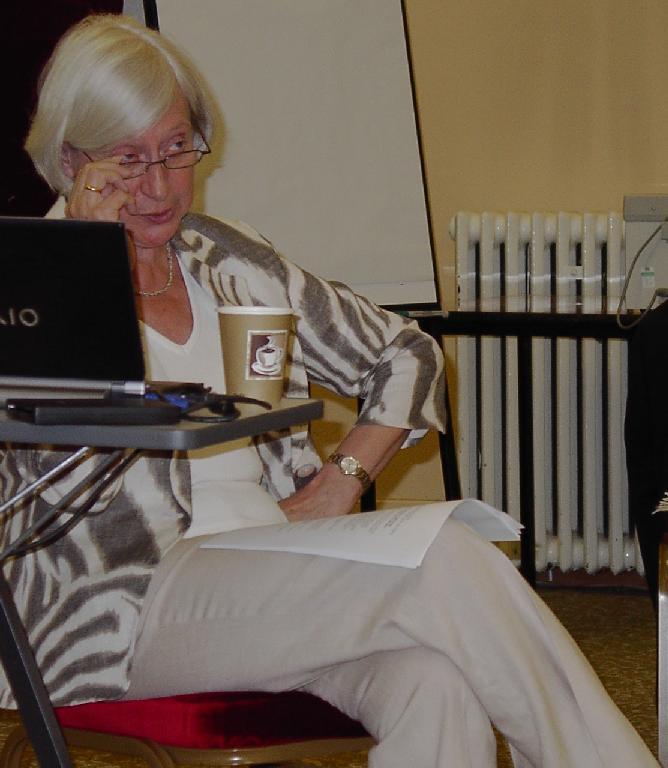
- Dame Denise Platt; DBE, DSocSc. BSc.Econ. AIMSW. FRSA
- Born: 21 February 1945 (age 81)
- Occupation: British civil servant

Dame Denise Platt DBE FRSA (born 21 February 1945) is a British civil servant. She is the Chair of the Commission for Social Care Inspection. Prior to this appointment in 2004, she was Chief Inspector, Social Services Inspectorate, and, later, Director for Children, Older People and Social Care Services at the Department of Health of the United Kingdom.

== Career ==
Her first job on qualifying was as a Medical Social Worker at the Middlesex Hospital in London. She has since held a variety of posts in hospital social work, local government and social care. These include Team Leader in the Social Work Department at Guy's Hospital, Principal Social Worker, Hammersmith Hospital, Director of Social Services, London Borough of Hammersmith and Fulham and Head of Social Services at the Local Government Association. She is a past President of the Association of Directors of Social Services, and was Chair of the National Institute for Social Work.

== Honours ==
She is also an honorary fellow of the Centre for Citizen Participation at Brunel University, an honorary council member of the National Society for the Prevention of Cruelty to Children (NSPCC), a member of the National Executive Council of the Family Planning Association, a Governor of the University of Bedfordshire, Chair of the National AIDS Trust, a member of the Independent Review Board of the Cheshire Fire and Rescue Services and a Trustee of NSPCC.
