= Special Hospitals Service Authority =

The Special Hospitals Service Authority (SHSA) was a special health authority of the National Health Service in England from 1989 to 1996. It had responsibility for managing the three high-security "special" psychiatric hospitals in England: Ashworth, Broadmoor and Rampton.

The SHSA was established to distance the hospitals from the direct control of the Department of Health. Its Operational Brief set out six principal objectives:

1. ensure the continuing safety of the public;
2. ensure the provision of appropriate treatment for patients;
3. ensure a good quality of life for both patients and staff;
4. develop the hospitals as centres of excellence for the training of staff in all disciplines in forensic and other branches of psychiatry, psychiatric care and treatment;
5. develop closer working relationships with local and regional NHS psychiatric services;
6. promote research into fields related to forensic psychiatry.

This document also stated that the Authority should be "constituted as a small organisation, operating flexibly and maximising delegation of operational responsibility to hospital level, rather than acting as a centralised interventionist body". To this end, a Unit General Manager was appointed to oversee the work of each of the three hospitals.

The Authority was abolished in 1996, when its commissioning functions passed to the High Security Psychiatric Services Commissioning Board, while each of the hospitals became independently managed as a Special Health Authority in its own right.

== See also ==
- Prison § Psychiatric facilities
