= Central Services Agency =

The Central Services Agency (CSA) was established in October 1973 and was responsible for providing support services to various health and social work agencies in Northern Ireland.

== Functions ==
The CSA had the following core functions:

- Counter-Fraud Unit
- Equality Unit
- Family Practitioner Services
- Finance
- Human Resources
- Legal Services
- Regional Supplies Service
- Research and Development

== Transfer ==
On 1 April 2009, most of the CSA's responsibilities were transferred to the newly created Health & Social Care Business Services Organisation.
