= Regulation and Quality Improvement Authority (Northern Ireland) =

Agency overview
- Formed: 27 February 2003
- Jurisdiction: Northern Ireland
- Headquarters: Cromac Ave, Belfast
- Agency executive: Briege Donaghy, Chief Executive
- Key document: The Health and Personal Social Services (Quality, Improvement and Regulation) (Northern Ireland) Order 2003
- Website: https://www.rqia.org.uk/

The Regulation and Quality Improvement Authority was established in 2003 and is responsible for regulating healthcare and social care services in Northern Ireland

== Controversies ==
In 2020, the entire board resigned over the handling of the COVID-19 pandemic in Northern Ireland, specifically reducing the frequency of inspections of care homes and stopping inspectors from talking to residents. It was reported that a broader breakdown in relationships, and inadequate communication had also contributed to the mass resignation.

On 2023, it was reported that a group of staff had signed a letter criticising a report for an inspection into a hospital for not 'going far enough'.

== See also ==
- Care Quality Commission
- Care Inspectorate (Scotland)
- Care Inspectorate Wales
- Healthcare Inspectorate Wales
- Healthcare Improvement Scotland
- Health Information and Quality Authority (Republic of Ireland)
