= Care Inspectorate (Scotland) =

Scottish scrutiny body

Non Departmental Body overview
- Formed: 2011
- Superseding Non Departmental Body: Care Commission, SWIA and HMIE
- Jurisdiction: Scotland
- Headquarters: Compass House; 11 Riverside Drive; Dundee, DD1 4NY
- Employees: 606
- Non Departmental Body executive: Jackie Irvine, Chief Executive
- Key document: Public Services Reform (Scotland) Act 2010
- Website: www.careinspectorate.com

The Care Inspectorate (formally known as Social Care and Social Work Improvement Scotland) (Scottish Gaelic: Coimisean a’ Chùraim) is a scrutiny body which supports improvement. They look at the quality of care in Scotland to ensure it meets high standards. Where improvement is needed, they support services to make positive changes. The Care Inspectorate was set up in April 2011 by the Scottish Government as a single regulatory body for social work and social care services, including child protection and the integration of children's services. The new organisation took on work in these areas previously carried out by:

- Her Majesty's Inspectorate of Education (HMIE)
- the Social Work Inspection Agency (SWIA) and
- The Care Commission

== Background ==
The Scottish Commission for the Regulation of Care, known as the Care Commission, carried out the legal duty to regulate specific care services in Scotland between 2002 and 2011.

The Care Commission began work in April 2002 as an independent regulator under the Regulation of Care (Scotland) Act 2001. The key principles of the Commission in regulating care services were threefold; keeping people safe; promoting dignity and choice, and supporting independence.

The Social Work Inspection Agency (SWIA) had the remit to inspect all social work services in Scotland, and to report publicly and to parliament on the quality of these services, locally and nationally.

Her Majesty's Inspectorate of Education (HMIE) in Scotland had the remit of scrutinising education services, and had a specific role to monitor child protection services. It was the latter function which was transferred to the Care Inspectorate (SCSWIS) in 2011.

The Public Services Reform (Scotland) Act 2010 came into force in April 2011. It aimed to reduce and to streamline the number of Government agencies, including the different regulators. As a result, the previous work of the Care Commission, of SWIA and of HMIE (children's services remit) were absorbed into the new Social Care and Social Work Improvement Scotland (SCSWIS). Care services in the country became regulated by SCSWIS, who from 15 September 2011, adopted the simpler working name of the Care Inspectorate.

== Services regulated ==
The Care Commission had the responsibility for the regulation of a range of services in Scotland providing care to children, adults and older people. The following is a full list of services regulated by the commission.

- Adult placement services
- Care homes for people with drug and alcohol misuse problems
- Care homes for people with learning disabilities
- Care homes for people with mental health problems
- Care homes for older people
- Care homes for people with physical and sensory impairment
- Housing support services
- Services for people in criminal justice supported accommodation
- Short breaks and respite care
- Support services
- Adoption agencies
- Care homes for children and young people
- Childcare agencies
- Early education and childcare up to the age of 16
- Foster care and family placement services
- School care and family placement services
- School care accommodation services
- Care at home
- Nurse agencies

== Scope and statistics ==
The Care Inspectorate annually regulate over 14,000 care services used by 320,000 people. In 2019 the Care Inspectorate had 606 staff.

== Methods of regulation ==
The form of regulation carried out by the Care Commission was largely laid down in the Regulation of Care (Scotland) Act, 2001, and associated Statutory Instruments.

The regulation was carried out by means of RICE, which is an acronym for Registration, Inspection, Complaints investigation, and Enforcement.

Registration ensured that the service, before opening, could demonstrate that it would be provided in line with legal and good practice requirements, and in conformity with the Health and Social Care Standards.

Inspection monitored the quality of the service. They were often unannounced, and usually resulted in recommendations or requirements on the service. The inspections were summarised in a report available on the internet through the website of the Care Commission. They remain available through the website of its successor organisation, the Care Inspectorate, to provide a continuous record with the inspection reports of the latter organisation.

Complaint investigations were initiated by communication from service users, their relatives, or members of the public. A complaint investigation often, as in inspection, resulted in recommendations, requirements, and less often in enforcement action.

Enforcement occurs where a service has not complied with legal requirements despite these having been made clear to the service. It usually consists of additional conditions on further operation: where these are not met, the enforcement can ultimately lead to the closure of the service.

== A changed approach ==
In 2008 the Care Commission changed its approach to inspection. While still based on the National Care Standards, the criteria for assessing quality were grouped and organised into "Quality Themes". These are inspected, and then graded in the report of the inspection. Services are expected to self assess and to grade their performance, and to involve their users in assessing the quality of the service provided.

These changes are part of a wider project known as Regulation for Improvement. The focus on improvement is centred on how well people who use the service have a say in its quality, and in how it is operated. There is also more emphasis on inspection officers taking part in aspects of the service. For example, the inspection might include being at meetings, seeing activities in the service, etc.

Services are given grades on four Quality Themes:

- Care and Support,
- Environment
- Staffing
- Leadership and Management.

Quality grades vary on a six-point scale - Unsatisfactory, Weak, Adequate, Good, Very Good and Excellent.

A grading scale is also used by HMIE when inspecting schools. There were integrated inspections involving the Care Commission and HMIE. The Care Commission gives specific weighting on grades to ensure that less than adequate performance clearly brings down the overall grade. This provides a greater motive for improvement in those areas.

The aim of the grading system was to provide a clearer indicator of quality and of where improvements were needed. The changed approach was welcomed: it allows a greater focus on the point of view of the service user, and allowing funding authorities to make clearer, quality based decisions about ongoing funding.

In September 2011, under plans to toughen up the system, it was revealed that Scottish care homes will get at least one unannounced inspection a year.

The grading system was retained by the Care Inspectorate when it took over the work of the Care Commission.

== Transfer of responsibilities ==
After the release of the Crerar Review, on the simplification of regulatory processes in Scotland, the Scottish Government in November 2008 announced :

"... there will be two new improvement and scrutiny organisations from April 2011 - a single body for healthcare services and another body for social work and social care services, including child protection and the integration of children's services. The new bodies will take on work in these areas currently done by:

- Her Majesty's Inspectorate of Education (HMIE)
- NHS Quality Improvement Scotland (NHS QIS)
- Social Work Inspection Agency (SWIA)
- The Care Commission

With the exception of independent healthcare regulation, all of SWIA's and the Care Commission's previous work was carried out by the new social work and social care services body, Social Care and Social Work Improvement Scotland (SCSWIS). HMIE's work on the inspection of services to protect children and a model of inspection for children's services became a joint responsibility with the SCSWIS. The work of NHS QIS, plus the regulation of independent healthcare previously carried out by the Care Commission, transferred to the new healthcare body, Healthcare Improvement Scotland (HIS).

The affected organisations including the Care Commission worked closely together to ensure a smooth changeover to the new structures.

== Governance and Oversight ==
Issues with the Care Inspectorate's performance and the effectiveness of the Scottish Parliament's oversight of it have long been raised at the highest level in Scotland. In 2011, the Health Secretary, Nicola Sturgeon announced that the Care Inspectorate was failing to fulfil its obligations.

During the Covid-19 pandemic, on 25 August 2020, the Care Inspectorate's then Chief Executive gave evidence to the Scottish Parliament’s Health and Sport Committee at a meeting to consider the question: “How well is the Care Inspectorate fulfilling its statutory roles?”

Prior to the meeting, the Scottish Parliament solicited the views and experiences of social care providers in Scotland to support the Committee in questioning the Care Inspectorate. Respondents describe a Care Inspectorate which fails to engage meaningfully with the services it regulates and that this comes at a cost for services and service users.

== See also ==
- Healthcare Improvement Scotland
- Care Inspectorate Wales
- Care Quality Commission
- Regulation and Quality Improvement Authority (Northern Ireland)
