= Health & Social Care Business Services Organisation =

Business Services Organisation (BSO)
- Predecessor: Central Services Agency
- Formation: 2009
- Purpose: The Business Services Organisation (BSO) has been established to provide a broad range of regional business support functions and specialist professional services to the health and social care sector in Northern Ireland.
- Location: Head Quarters - 2 Franklin Street, Belfast BT2 8DQ, Northern Ireland

The Business Services Organisation (BSO) was established in 2009 and is responsible for providing support services to various health and social work agencies in Northern Ireland.

It was created from the now defunct Central Services Agency.

== See also ==
- NHS National Services Scotland
- NHS Business Services Authority
