= Scottish Patient Safety Programme =

Scottish health initiative

The Scottish Patient Safety Programme (SPSP) is national initiative to improve the reliability of healthcare and reduce the different types of harm that can be associated. The programme is co-ordinated by Healthcare Improvement Scotland and is the first example of a country introducing a national patient safety programme across the whole healthcare system. From an initial focus on acute hospitals, the SPSP now includes safety improvement programmes including SPSP Primary care, SPSP Medicines, Maternity and Children Quality Improvement Collaborative (MCQIC) and Mental Health.

== Acute hospitals ==
The programme was launched in January 2008. The first stage had a focus on activities in acute hospitals in Scotland to reduce mortality and adverse events by the end of 2012. Shortly after the programme began, there were improvements reported in several areas of care. This included reductions in the number of cases of bloodstream infections associated with central lines, ventilator-acquired pneumonia and the length of time patients were staying in intensive care. As the end of the first phase of the programme was reached in 2012, it was clear that good progress had been made towards the overall aim of reducing mortality by 15 per cent and adverse events by 30 per cent. By March 2015, the programme was running in GP surgeries, hospitals, mental health and maternity services.

== Mental health ==
NHS Greater Glasgow and Clyde is pioneering the mental health arm of the Scottish Patient Safety Programme. The SPSP Mental Health is working with Scottish Government and Partners to deliver the "Mental Health Strategy: 2017- 2027".

== Maternity and Children Quality Improvement Collaborative (MCQIC) ==
The Maternity and Children Quality Improvement Collaborative brings together SPSP's Maternity, Neonatal and Paediatric care communities.

== Primary care ==
In community settings there was a focus on three main workstreams: leadership and culture; safer use of medicines; safe and effective patient care across the interface. £450,000 of funding was put towards work to reduce prescribing errors, through better communication between general practitioners and community pharmacists.
