= NHS National Services Scotland =

- Type: National Health Service (NHS) Scotland Board
- Established: 1 April 1974
- Disbanded: 31 March 2026
- Headquarters: Gyle Square, 1 South Gyle Crescent, Edinburgh
- Region served: Scotland
- Chair: Keith Redpath
- Chief executive: Mary Morgan
- Staff: 3,400+
- Website: Official website

NHS National Services Scotland (NSS) was a public body and national health board of NHS Scotland.

Accountable to the Scottish Government, NSS worked at the heart of Scotland’s health service, providing national strategic support services and expert advice to NHS Scotland.

Its integral role to NHS Scotland means the organisation worked closely with other organisations across Scotland’s health and care landscape - especially NHS Boards - in the delivery of its services.

NSS employed around 3,400 highly specialised staff based in various locations across Scotland.

== History ==
NSS began operations on 1 April 1974 as the Common Services Agency, formed in accordance with The National Health Service (Functions of the Common Services Agency) (Scotland) Order 1974. The agency's mandate was to provide national strategic support services and expert advice to Scotland's health sector while maximising health impacts and cost savings. This remains central to NSS's purpose today.

The UK Supreme Court ruled in favour of the Common Services Agency in a 2014 legal ruling, Healthcare at Home Limited v. The Common Services Agency. An unsuccessful tenderer had challenged the agency's contract award decision. In the course of the court's deliberations over the legal issues, Lord Reed spoke at some length of the various hypothetical persons whose judgment is held to be indicative of the assessment that a reasonable person might make, typically called the Man on the Clapham omnibus. The Court held that there was a long tradition in law of considering such hypothetical judgments, and rejected the need to consider the evidence of any actual witnesses in place of the hypothetical reasonable person.

In 2013, the Public Services Reform (Functions of the Common Services Agency for the Scottish Health Service) (Scotland) Order 2013 extended the remit of NSS, enabling the provision of services to other bodies, including local authorities and government departments.

The following year, the Public Bodies (Joint Working) Scotland Act 2014 reinforced this requirement to maximise health, financial, and environmental impacts by engaging with and offering services to the wider public sector in Scotland.

NSS operated across the whole of Scotland, providing a wide range of national services and managing one-third of the NHSScotland budget. It had twelve national services aimed at supporting the health and wellbeing of the people of Scotland:

1. Digital and Security: Focusing on the delivery and management of national digital platforms, cyber security, and supporting services. It was responsible for providing clinical informatics to NHSScotland, and ensuring information security and governance through innovative and scalable technology.
2. National Contact Centre: NSS’s National Contact Centre provided call centre services including vaccination appointment booking, rescheduling, and providing advice to help individuals access health and care services.
3. Primary Care Support: This NSS service supported general practitioners, dentists, opticians, community pharmacies, and dispensing contractors in delivering primary care across Scotland. It managed contractor payments, maintained an up-to-date patient registration database, handles medical record transfers, and oversees clinical governance for dental services.
4. Specialist Healthcare Commissioning: This service commissioned a range of specialist and rare condition treatments, and strategic networks focusing on specific population health requirements. It ensuresedequitable and affordable access to these services when needed.
5. Population Screening: Responsible for the oversight, quality assurance, and coordination at a national level of Scotland’s six population screening programmes.
6. Legal: The Central Legal Office (CLO) provided specialist legal advice and assistance in most areas of law relevant to the public sector to NHSScotland. It provided clients with a comprehensive legal service and counsels them on a wide range of policy issues.
7. Programme Management: This service acted as a national delivery provider, offering total solutions in portfolio, programme, project management, and transformation services. It supports the delivery of complex and challenging change programmes.
8. National Procurement: Provided strategic sourcing and national procurement services to NHSScotland. It worked collaboratively to provide best quality, fit-for-purpose, and best value commercial solutions. It also provided expert logistics services, including distribution, supply chain, warehouse operations, fleet management, and national eProcurement solutions.
9. Fraud Prevention: This service worked in partnership across NHSScotland and the wider Scottish public sector to reduce the risk of fraud and corruption. It was responsible for checking patient exemptions in respect of NHSScotland patient charges and collecting payments for incorrectly claimed exemptions.
10. Blood, Tissues and Cells: The Scottish National Blood Transfusion Service (SNBTS) provideed blood, tissues, and cells to NHSScotland. It ensured 24/7 blood supply and availability and offers specialist treatment and therapeutic solutions, along with specialist testing and diagnostic services.
11. Corporate Shared Services: This growing service provided corporate services in areas such as finance, HR, digital, facilities, procurement, and business support to other health boards. As of 2024, it managed payroll for eight NHSScotland boards and delivers a full corporate shared services solution for Public Health Scotland.
12. NHSScotland Assure: Launched in 2020, this service delivered a coordinated approach to improving risk management and quality in the healthcare built environment across NHSScotland. It included services provided by Antimicrobial Resistance and Healthcare Associated Infection (ARHAI) Scotland and Health Facilities Scotland.

== Public Services Delivery Scotland ==

Public Services Delivery Scotland (PSD Scotland), replaced NHS Education for Scotland (NES) and NHS National Services Scotland (NSS) on 1st April 2026.

The new organisation was developed to lead on workforce planning and development, service infrastructure and innovation, with a focus on digital transformation. All existing NES and NSS functions were absorbed into the new organisation, with any changes to operational procedures expected to occur after an initial 6 month embedding period.

== Pandemic response ==
NSS played a pivotal role in the national response to the COVID-19 pandemic. As the pandemic unfolded, NSS undertook a series of measures to support the healthcare system in Scotland.

One of the key areas of focus was procurement. NSS developed over 300 contracts, which directly supported Scotland’s response to the COVID-19 emergency. This included sourcing and distributing over 1 billion items of personal protective equipment (PPE) across Health and Social Care in Scotland.

In the realm of digital technology, NSS harnessed clinical innovation to support rapid and meaningful transformation in the healthcare landscape. This was particularly relevant as the healthcare sector underwent significant changes due to the pandemic.

NSS also played a crucial role in the establishment and operation of the NHS Louisa Jordan - a temporary hospital set up in response to the COVID-19 pandemic. Although the NHS Louisa Jordan was not required to treat COVID-19 patients, it played a crucial role in supporting the remobilisation of NHSScotland.

NSS Programme Management teams, alongside wider national services offered by the board, also played a critical role in a wide range of COVID-19 programmes, including the establishment of a national testing infrastructure, and the national roll out of Scotland’s COVID-19 vaccination programme.

== Strategic Framework 2024-2026 ==
The latest NSS Strategic Framework for 2024-2026 sets out the organisation’s purpose, vision, priorities and objectives, as well as the NHSScotland values.

Purpose

NSS’s purpose was to provide national solutions to improve the health and wellbeing of the people of Scotland. It supported NHSScotland and the wider needs of health and care to ensure that people in Scotland can lead healthy and active lives and are appropriately cared for.

Vision

NSS’s vision was to be integral to Scotland’s health and care service. Its national infrastructure, services, and solutions continued to play an important role in the recovery and renewal of health and care. NSS aimed to deliver national solutions effectively and efficiently, benefiting people in Scotland.

Priorities

In summary, there were three strategic priorities that summarised the support of NSS to health and care organisations across Scotland:

- Enable - acknowledges NSS’s role in aiding programmes to implement new or enhanced health and care solutions at national, regional, or local levels
- Underpin – recognises NSS’s infrastructure role and its provision of essential core services to NHSScotland. It also is about improvement and the organisations continuous focus on quality in the delivery of its services
- Assist – acknowledges where NSS works in partnership with other organisations involved in health and care, to explore how it leverages its national infrastructure and clinical expertise, to meet emerging needs across health and care.

Strategic Objectives

NSS had four strategic objectives to guide its direction and decision making and ensure alignment with wider NHSScotland strategies:

- Service Excellence aimed to enhance the quality and value of NHSScotland services provided by NSS.
- Financial Sustainability focused on fostering a culture of financial stewardship to ensure effective resource utilisation and achieve a breakeven position.
- Workforce Sustainability aimed to cultivate a diverse and skilled workforce that can adapt to the evolving service needs of NHSScotland and make NSS an attractive workplace.
- Climate Sustainability was committed to integrating climate sustainability in all NSS operations and supporting NHSScotland in achieving net-zero greenhouse gas emissions by 2040.

== See also ==
- NHS Business Services Authority
- Health & Social Care Business Services Organisation

== Sources ==
- The National Health Service (Functions of the Common Services Agency) (Scotland) Order 1974
- Public Services Reform (Functions of the Common Services Agency for the Scottish Health Service) (Scotland) Order 2013
- Public Bodies (Joint Working) Scotland Act 2014
- NSS Annual Report 2022/23
- NSS Board
- NHSScotland Climate Emergency and Sustainability Strategy
- NSS Strategic Framework for 2024-2026
