= NHS Counter Fraud Authority =

Agency overview
- Formed: 1 November 2017
- Preceding agency: NHS Protect
- Jurisdiction: England
- Headquarters: Canary Wharf, London, England
- Employees: 215 (2024/25)
- Minister responsible: Karin Smyth, Minister of State for Health
- Agency executives: Alex Rothwell, Chief executive officer; Dame Linda Pollard, Chairman; Tricia Morrison, Performance management; Mathew Jordan-Boyd, Chief financial officer
- Parent department: Department of Health and Social Care
- Website: cfa.nhs.uk

The NHS Counter Fraud Authority is a special health authority charged with identifying, investigating and preventing fraud and other economic crime within the NHS and the wider health group, formed on 1 November 2017 under section 28 of the National Health Service Act 2006. It replaces its predecessor NHS Protect, which was part of the NHS Business Services Authority.

== Role ==
As a special health authority focused entirely on counter-fraud work, the Counter Fraud Authority is independent from other NHS bodies and as an arm's length body is directly accountable to the Department of Health and Social Care.

The departmental sponsor is the Department of Health and Social Care's Anti-Fraud Unit, which holds the board to account for the delivery of its strategy.

The mission of the organisation is to lead the fight against fraud affecting the NHS and wider health service, and protect vital resources intended for patient care. It is intended to be the single expert, intelligence-led organisation providing centralised intelligence, investigation and solutions capacity for tackling fraud in the NHS in England. It acts as the repository for all information related to fraud in the NHS and the wider health group, and will have oversight of and monitor counter fraud work across the NHS.

In the most recent publication of their Strategic Intelligence Assessment (SIA), the NHSCFA estimates approximately £1.346 billion in NHS funding is vulnerable to fraud, bribery, and corruption.

== Vision and Objectives ==
The vision of the NHSCFA is “Working together to understand, find and prevent fraud, bribery and corruption in the NHS”. As part of their three-year Strategy, which commenced in 2023, they set out four counter fraud pillars; Understand, Prevent, Respond, and Assure. These are also underpinned by two additional pillars; People and Resources.

The five objectives for the NHSCFA are:

1. Deliver the Department of Health's strategy, vision and strategic plan and lead counter fraud activity in the NHS in England.
2. Be the single expert intelligence-led organisation providing a centralised investigation capacity for complex economic crime matters in the NHS.
3. Lead and influence the improvement of standards in counter fraud work across the NHS.
4. Take the lead in and encourage fraud reporting across the NHS and wider health group.
5. Continue to develop the expertise of staff.

It aims to identify current and future fraud risks and adapt to emerging threats and issues, meeting head-on the fraud risks affecting the NHS and wider health group.

== Location ==
The organisation's headquarters is at 10 South Colonnade in Canary Wharf, London, with additional offices at Citygate in Newcastle upon Tyne and Earlsden Park in Coventry.

== See also ==
- NHS Counter Fraud and Security Management Service Division
