= Supply Chain Coordination Limited =

British government company

- Industry: Health and Social Care
- Founded: 25 July 2017
- Founder: Department of Health and Social Care
- Headquarters: London
- Key people: Heather Tierney-Moore OBE – Non-executive chair Andrew New – Acting CEO
- Owner: HM Government

Supply Chain Coordination Limited is a company registered in England and Wales on 25 July 2017 to manage the new NHS Supply Chain operating model, adopting its current company name on 15 November 2017. It was set up by the Department of Health and Social Care in 2018, and was intended to save £2.4 billion within 4–5 years. Consultants Ernst & Young were reportedly paid up to £20 million to help to establish the company. Running costs for the financial year 2018/19 were £180 million, but costs are predicted to grow to £250 million in 2019/20 and to £260 million in 2020/21. This will be taken from the tariff payments to NHS trusts.

The Secretary of State for Health and Social Care is the company's sole shareholder. Matt Hancock, then Secretary of State, set out in a letter dated 28 March 2019 the company's purpose, tasks, performance indicators, objectives, funding and governance.

The company's first non-executive chair was Jim Spittle, and its CEO was Jin Sahota. In September 2020, Sahota resigned. Andrew New, the group director for purchasing and supply chain at JCB was appointed to succeed him in July 2021.
