= Denise Coia =

Scottish psychiatrist and mental health advocate (1952–2020)

Dame Denise Coia DBE FRSE
- Born: Denise Assunta Coia; 4 June 1952
- Died: 9 April 2020 (aged 67)
- Occupation: Psychiatrist

Dame Denise Assunta Coia, DBE, FRSE (4 June 1952 – 9 April 2020) was a Scottish psychiatrist and mental health advocate. Having originally trained in obstetrics, she retrained in psychiatry and spent the rest of her career working with and advocating for people in some of the most deprived communities in Scotland. She served as Vice-President of the Royal College of Psychiatrists from 2005 to 2010, Principal Medical Officer (Mental Health) to the Scottish Government from 2006 to 2011, Chair of Healthcare Improvement Scotland from 2010 to 2018, and Convener of Children in Scotland from 2017 to 2019.

In the 2016 Queen's Birthday Honours, Coia was appointed Dame Commander of the Order of the British Empire (DBE) for services to mental health and the NHS. In 2018, she was elected a Fellow of the Royal Society of Edinburgh (FRSE).
