= UK Committee of Postgraduate Dental Deans and Directors =

The Committee of Postgraduate Dental Deans and Directors, according to its website comprises the Postgraduate Dental Deans and Directors in the English Deaneries, together with their three colleagues for Northern Ireland, Scotland and Wales.

"The Postgraduate Dental Deans and Directors are charged with managing Postgraduate Education for Dentists in their Deanery. At present they manage Dental Vocational Training, Hospital Training for the Dental Specialities (as well as Oral & Maxillofacial Surgery) and Continuing Professional Development for all dentists within the framework of the NHS budgets provided for these purposes. In addition, they have a supportive role in returning and retraining dentists (including overseas dentists, refugees and asylum seekers) and poorly performing dentists. Postgraduate Dental Deans and Directors are also going to be responsible for the post-qualification education and training of Professionals Complementary to Dentistry".
