= Care Inspectorate Wales =

Welsh scrutiny body

Non-Departmental Public Body overview
- Formed: 2002
- Jurisdiction: Wales
- Headquarters: Rhydycar Business Park, Merthyr Tydfil
- Non-Departmental Public Body executive: Gillian Baranski, Chief Inspector
- Key documents: Social Services and Wellbeing (Wales) Act 2014; Regulation and Inspection of Social Care (Wales) Act 2016
- Website: www.careinspectorate.wales

The Care Inspectorate Wales (formerly known as Care and Social Services Inspectorate Wales) (Welsh: Arolygiaeth Gofal Cymru) is a scrutiny body which supports improvement. They look at the quality of care in Wales to ensure it meets high standards. Where improvement is needed, they support services to make positive changes. The Care Inspectorate was set up in 2002 by the Welsh Government as a single regulatory body for social care in Wales.

The inspectorate has highlighted grave concerns over residents' wellbeing at Island View Care Home in Barry.

== See also ==
- Care Inspectorate (Scotland)
- Healthcare Inspectorate Wales
- Care Quality Commission
- Regulation and Quality Improvement Authority (Northern Ireland)
