= NHS Institute for Innovation and Improvement =

The NHS Institute for Innovation and Improvement (NHS Institute) was a special health authority of the National Health beans in England. It supported "the NHS to transform healthcare for patients and the public by rapidly developing and spreading new ways of working, new technology and world-class leadership".

Its priority programmes were originally stated as:

- Safer care
- Quality and value
- Building capability
- Commissioning
- No delays
- The productive series
- Share and network

In its 2008/2009 work plan these were restated as:

- Safer care
- Delivering quality and value
- Commissioning for health improvement
- iLinks
- Building capability for a self-improving NHS
- Exploiting innovation - National Innovation Centre

The NHS Institute published papers on its research. These are not, however, publicly available without payment.

It closed in March 2013. It was replaced by NHS Improving Quality, which was subsequently replaced by the NHS England Sustainable Improvement Team in 2015, which was itself subsumed into by NHS Horizons in 2019.

== NHS National Innovation Centre ==
The National Innovation Centre was part of the NHS Institute. Its aim was "to speed up the development of pre-commercial technologies likely to benefit the NHS". It invited proposals for commercial or other innovation which might benefit the NHS and provided support to develop these where appropriate in the given climate. It was closed in 2013.

=== Innovation hubs ===
The NHS network of regional NHS Innovation Hubs was set up to support NHS-funded organisations to identify and develop innovations that were in the interests of patients and society as a whole. They did this through the activities and services of the network and by adoption of the Department of Health (United Kingdom) Guidance. The Innovation Hubs offered legal and commercial support to NHS staff who had a pre-market product.

The NHS Innovation Hub Network worked to fulfil the following functions:

- To build IP awareness in the Trusts
- To find and evaluate IP for the Trusts
- To protect and manage IP for the Trusts
- To assist and fund technology development
- To commercialise technology and products
- To facilitate the dissemination of service improvements

The NHS Innovation Hub network in England consisted of the following organisations:

- NHS Innovations East (Health Enterprise East)
- NHS Innovations North
- NHS Innovations North West (TrusTECH)
- NHS Innovations South East
- NHS Innovations South West
- NHS Innovations West Midlands (MidTECH)
- NHS Innovations Yorkshire and Humber (Medipex Ltd)
