= Healthcare Inspectorate Wales =

National healthcare organisation for Wales

- Formation: 1 April 2004
- Headquarters: Rhydycar Business Park, Merthyr Tydfil
- Region served: Wales
- Chief executive: Alun Jones
- Staff: 87 FTE (2022/23)
- Website: Official website

Healthcare Inspectorate Wales (HIW) (Welsh: Arolygiaeth Gofal Iechyd Cymru, AGIC) is the national healthcare improvement organisation for Wales. It is a public body which is part of NHS Wales and created in April 2004.

== History ==
The function of this body is to implement the healthcare priorities of the Welsh Government, in particular the Quality and Improvement Strategy of NHS Wales.

== See also ==
- Care Inspectorate Wales
- Healthcare Improvement Scotland
- Regulation and Quality Improvement Authority (Northern Ireland)
- Care Quality Commission
