= Commission for Social Care Inspection =

English non-departmental public body

- Predecessor: Social Services Inspectorate
- Successor: Ofsted, Care Quality Commission
- Formation: 1 April 2004
- Dissolved: 31 March 2009; 17 years ago
- Type: Non-departmental public body
- Purpose: Inspectorate for social care in England
- Region served: UK
- Official language: English
- Chair: Dame Denise Platt DBE

The Commission for Social Care Inspection was a non-departmental public body and the single, independent inspectorate for social care in England. Its sponsor department was the Department of Health of the United Kingdom government. It incorporated the work formerly done by the Social Services Inspectorate (SSI), the SSI/Audit Commission Joint Review Team and the National Care Standards Commission (NCSC).

== History ==
The Commission brought together the inspection, regulation and review of all social care services into one organisation. It was created by the Health and Social Care (Community Health and Standards) Act 2003 and became fully operational on 1 April 2004. The Commission received grant in aid from the Department of Health and also raised part of its running costs by charging regulatory fees. The fees were set out in The Commission for Social Care Inspection (Fees and Frequency of Inspections) Regulations 2004.

After 1 April 2007, the regulation of children's services (fostering and adoption agencies, boarding schools and children's homes) no longer fell within the remit of the CSCI. These functions were then carried out by Ofsted.

The Commission was abolished on 31 March 2009 and was succeeded by the Care Quality Commission.

== Commissioners ==
- Chair - Dame Denise Platt DBE
- Chief Inspector - Paul Snell
- Commissioner - John Knight
- Commissioner - Professor Jim Mansell
- Commissioner - Dr. Olu Olasode
- Commissioner - Peter Westland CBE
- Commissioner - Beryl Seaman CBE

== See also ==
- Social Work Inspection Agency, the equivalent organization in Scotland between 2005 and 2011.
