= NHS Business Services Authority =

- Abbreviation: NHSBSA
- Formation: 1 October 2005
- Type: Arm's length body of the Department for Health and Social Care
- Headquarters: Stella House, Newcastle upon Tyne
- Region served: England and Wales
- Key people: Sue Douthwaite (Chair), Michael Brodie (Chief Executive)
- Main organ: Board of directors
- Parent organisation: National Health Service
- Staff: 3,200
- Website: www.nhsbsa.nhs.uk

- Applies to: England and Wales

Other UK counterparts
- Northern Ireland: Health & Social Care Business Services Organisation
- Scotland: NHS National Services Scotland

The NHS Business Services Authority (NHSBSA) is an executive non-departmental public body of the Department of Health and Social Care which provides a number of support services to the National Health Service in England and Wales. It was created on 1 October 2005 following a review by the Department of Health of its "arm's length bodies". It began operating on 1 April 2006, bringing together five previously separate NHS business support organisations.

The body provides services to NHS organisations, NHS contractors and patients which include:

- NHS Help With Health Costs
- Student Services
- NHS Dental Services
- Administration of the NHS Pension Scheme
- Scanning Services
- NHS Jobs
- Electronic Staff Record
- Overseas Healthcare Services
- NHS Prescription Services

== Operations ==
The NHSBSA took over responsibility for checking prescriptions that had been dispensed free of charge to patients who claimed to be exempt from paying prescription charges in September 2014. To claim free prescriptions on medical grounds, patients are required to hold a valid medical exemption certificate, even if they have a life-long medical condition.

NHS Help With Health Costs provides free or reduced cost prescriptions through the NHS Low Income Scheme, medical exemption certificates, maternity exemption certificates, NHS Tax Credit Exemption Certificates and prescription prepayment certificates.

Student Services administers the NHS Bursary and Social Work Bursary schemes, including the NHS Learning Support Fund (LSF) on behalf of the Department of Health and Social Care. NHS Bursaries process applications for annual payments from the NHS to help students studying medicine, dentistry, nursing or healthcare courses in England. The Council of Deans of Health and Universities UK issued a joint statement on 30 June 2015 asking for an 'urgent' overhaul of student funding. Social Work Bursaries process applications for tri-annual payments to help students studying social work.

NHS Dental Services administers payments to dentists in England and Wales, and offers advice and information for dentists, commissioners and patients.

Dental, as well as Prescription, Provider Assurance services deliver performance and contract management activities.

NHSBSA administers the NHS Pension Scheme in England and Wales, offering services for members, employers and surviving spouses, partners or dependants.

Scanning services digitise medical records from across the NHS.

NHSBSA also took on NHS Jobs, the official online recruitment service for the NHS in England and Wales on 1 April 2018.

NHSBSA manages the Electronic Staff Record (ESR), the essential workforce management solution for the NHS in England and Wales, supporting the delivery of national workforce policy and strategy.

NHSBSA's Overseas Healthcare Services manages the European Health Insurance Card (EHIC).

NHS Prescription Services is the largest organisational component of the NHS Business Services Authority. Its primary function is to determine the reimbursement and remuneration due when prescriptions are dispensed outside hospitals anywhere in England. Detailed information, collected when prescriptions are processed for payment, is then made available to organisations within the NHS, to support management, planning and governance activities. NHS Prescription Services has previously been known as the Prescription Pricing Authority, and as the Prescription Pricing Division.

== Former operations ==
NHS Protect, an anti-fraud unit, was part of NHSBSA until its abolition in 2017.

From 2006 to 2018, NHS supplier management – including procurement and delivery – was contracted to DHL Supply Chain and supervised by NHSBSA. Those services are now handled by NHS Supply Chain and Supply Chain Coordination Limited.

== Personnel ==
Sue Douthwaite is chair of the authority.

Michael Brodie has been chief executive officer since summer 2019. He had been finance director at the NHSBSA before taking a similar role at Public Health England on its formation in 2013.

== Controversies ==
- Uniplex (UK) Ltd. was unsuccessful in a public procurement tender undertaken by NHS Business Services Authority. Their appeal against the authority's decision was initially ruled as out-of-time because it did not comply with the "promptly" aspect of the provision in the UK's Public Contracts Regulations obliging an unsuccessful tenderer to submit a challenge to the contracting authority's decision "promptly, and in any event within three months". In the European Court of Justice, case C-406/08, the court concluded that the UK's national provision was contrary to EU law because this form of wording prevented claimants from knowing the exact time limit which would apply. Legal practice in the UK was changed as a result.
- Between September and December 2014, 18,000 penalty charge notices were issued to patients who had declared they were exempt from paying the prescription charge by ticking the back of the prescription to say they held a valid medical exemption certificate, when in fact they did not hold one. A campaign against the penalty charge notices was led by Diabetes UK, which argued that the need for the exemption certificates had not been properly communicated to people with diabetes. It said many people had claimed free prescriptions without any problems since they were first diagnosed, without having a certificate, until the NHSBSA's new, more efficient checking systems uncovered the problem. Following the campaign the health minister, Dr Dan Poulter, asked the NHSBSA to cancel or refund the charges until patients could obtain a medical exemption certificate.

== See also ==
- NHS National Services Scotland
- Health & Social Care Business Services Organisation
