= NHS Supply Chain =

Government agency in the United Kingdom

NHS Supply Chain supports the National Health Service (NHS) in England, and other healthcare organisations in England and Wales, by providing procurement and logistics services.

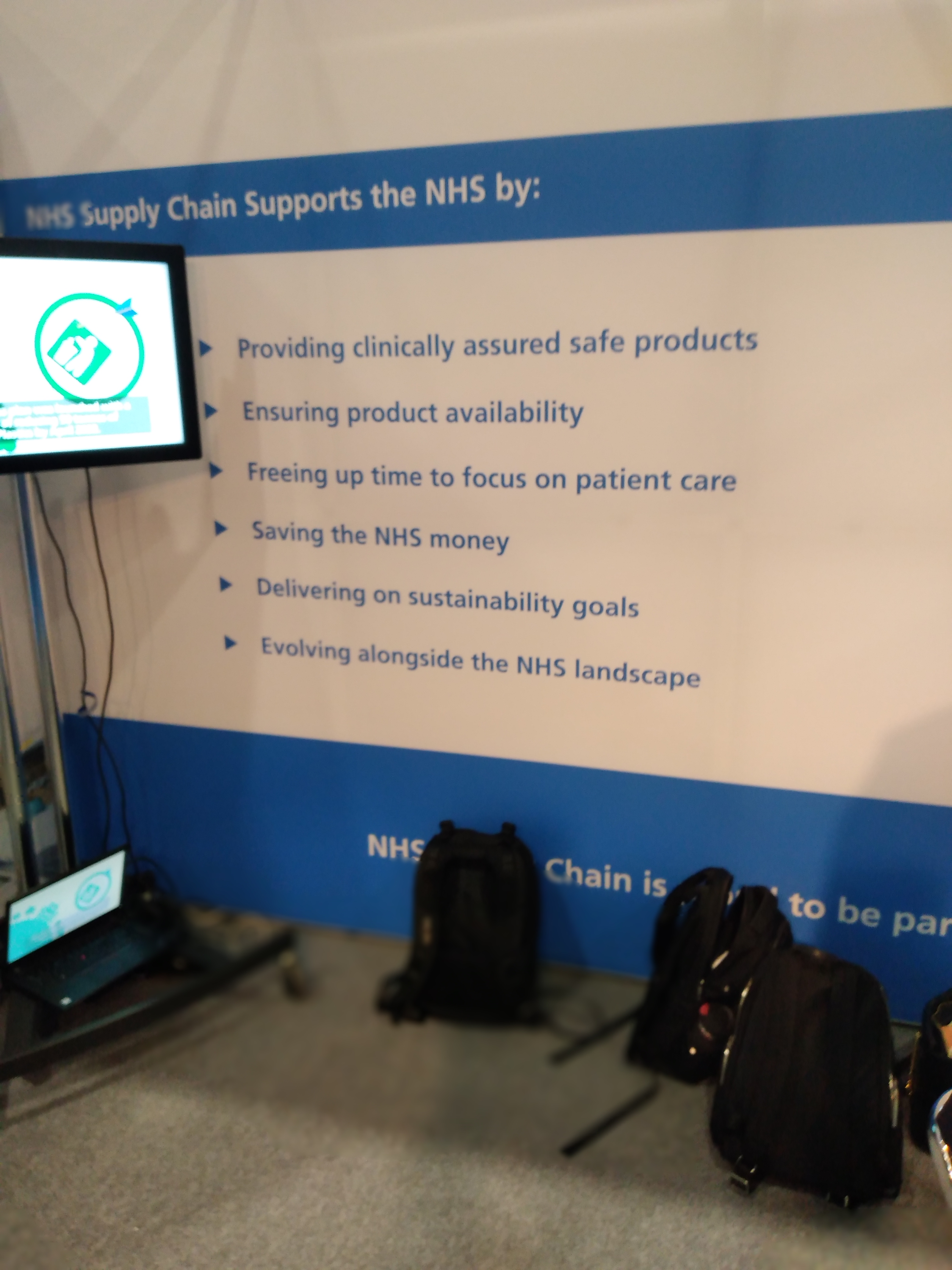
NHS Supply Chain exhibition stand

== History ==
In February 2016, Lord Carter's report into efficiency and productivity identified unwarranted variation in procurement across the NHS. Following this report, a "new operating model" for NHS Supply Chain was established. The design of a new supply chain service was planned to help the NHS deliver clinically assured, quality products at the best value through a range of specialist buying functions, and leverage the buying power of the NHS to negotiate the best deals from suppliers, with the aim to deliver savings of £2.4 billion over five years.

Oversight and operational management of the operating model are by Supply Chain Coordination Limited (SCCL), a company wholly owned by the Secretary of State for Health and Social Care, which began operations in April 2018. Services were transferred to the new model in stages during 2018 and early 2019. Over 200 staff were transferred from DHL Supply Chain and NHS Business Services Authority to the new company. Some elements of the NHS Purchase and Supply Agency were also transferred to the new organisation.

Until April 2019, the contract to run the service was managed from 2006 by DHL Supply Chain on behalf of the NHS Business Services Authority. Earlier, the organisation was called NHS Logistics Authority and then NHS Logistics. In July 2018, logistical control of the supply chain was passed from DHL Supply Chain to Unipart.

In February 2018, NHS Supply Chain notified all its NHS clients that Mondelez International, owners of Cadbury chocolate, had been 'delisted' after the company put up its prices, which the agency was "not prepared to accept ... on behalf of [its] customers".

A "value based procurement" initiative launched in 2019 seeks to find ways in which the benefits of supplier relationships are secured and measured not only in terms of cost savings but also in savings across the whole NHS economy and in improved patient outcomes and experiences. These may incur greater supplier cost in return for overall gains. For example, the initiative enabled Manchester University Foundation NHT Trust to use a specialist tissue glue after patient operations to prevent blood clotting, enabling patients to recover sooner and be discharged from hospital earlier, saving NHS bed usage and improving patient experience.

=== Impact of COVID-19 pandemic ===
A four-tiered demand management system to "maintain continuity of supply of critical products to the NHS where normal supply is disrupted" was established in response to the persistent problems in global supply chains that began with the rise of Covid in March 2020. In August 2022 it was reported that 271 products were in the two most stringent levels of rationing, including dressings, tracheostomy tubes, products for epidurals, blood collection equipment and ventilators for sleep therapy.

In April 2022, it took over responsibility for the Department of Health and Social Care's Personal Protective Equipment programme. A group of business analysts researched the ICN advice notices from suppliers in the last two weeks of November 2022, to look for trends and causes of delays in medical equipment throughout the NHS. They found that global component shortages caused over 60% of the NHS's medical equipment delays. The research also found that the number of delays peaked between 30 and 60 days at 22%, before dropping significantly to just over 1% between 90 and 120 days.

Jin Sahota, then chief executive, resigned in September 2020 shortly after the Department of Health and Social Care and the Cabinet Office announced a review of the agency following the crisis in the supply of personal protective equipment.

== Leadership ==
The current CEO is Andrew New, who was appointed in September 2021.

== Locations ==
The organisation has a number of warehouses:

- Somercotes, Derbyshire (head office)
- Bridgwater, Somerset
- Bury St Edmunds, Suffolk
- Maidstone, Kent
- Normanton, West Yorkshire
- Rugby, Warwickshire
- Widnes, Merseyside

There are also office sites in:

- Bracknell, Berkshire
- Chester, Cheshire
- Annesley, Nottinghamshire
- Leeds, West Yorkshire.

There are over 15,000 delivery locations serviced by the organisation.
