= Public Services Reform (Scotland) Act 2010 =

Act of the Scottish Parliament

Public Services Reform (Scotland) Act 2010 (Note: Section 134(1).)
- Act of the Scottish Parliament
- Scottish Parliament
- Long title: An Act of the Scottish Parliament to make provision for the purpose of simplifying public bodies, including the transfer and delegation of certain functions, the dissolution of certain bodies and provision in relation to the regulation of officers of court; to enable provision to be made for the purpose of improving the exercise of public functions and for removing and reducing burdens resulting from legislation; to make provision for the publication of information on expenditure and certain other matters by certain public bodies; to establish Creative Scotland with functions in relation to the arts and culture and industries and other activity the focus of which is the application of creative skills; to establish Social Care and Social Work Improvement Scotland with scrutiny functions in relation to care services and social work services; to establish Healthcare Improvement Scotland with scrutiny and other functions in relation to services provided under the National Health Service and independent health care services; to amend the Mental Health (Care and Treatment) (Scotland) Act 2003 to make provision in relation to the Mental Welfare Commission for Scotland; to make provision about the exercise of scrutiny functions by certain bodies, including provision in respect of the involvement of users of scrutinised services, co-operation and joint inspections; to amend Part 2 of the Public Finance and Accountability (Scotland) Act 2000 in relation to audit authorities and audit reports and examinations under that Part; to amend the Scottish Public Services Ombudsman Act 2002 to make provision in relation to complaints handling procedures of listed authorities; to amend the Charities and Trustee Investment (Scotland) Act 2005 in relation to the regulation of charities and charity trustees; and for connected purposes.
- Citation: 2010 asp 8
- Introduced by: John Swinney, Cabinet Secretary for Finance and Sustainable Growth
- Territorial extent: Scotland

Dates
- Royal assent: 28 April 2010
- Commencement: various (Note: Section 134(2)–(8).)

Other legislation
- Amends: Science and Technology Act 1965; Local Government (Scotland) Act 1973; National Heritage (Scotland) Act 1985; Debtors (Scotland) Act 1987; Criminal Procedure (Consequential Provisions) (Scotland) Act 1995; Deer (Scotland) Act 1996; Scottish Public Services Ombudsman Act 2002
- Amended by: National Library of Scotland Act 2012; Scottish Crown Estate Act 2019

Status: Amended

History of passage through the Parliament

Text of statute as originally enacted

Revised text of statute as amended

Text of the Public Services Reform (Scotland) Act 2010 as in force today (including any amendments) within the United Kingdom, from legislation.gov.uk.

The Public Services Reform (Scotland) Act 2010 (asp 8) was an act of the Scottish Parliament that made changes to the organisation of public services in Scotland.

== Provisions ==
The act established the development body for the arts and creative industries Creative Scotland.

The act also established the inspectorate Social Care and Social Work Improvement Scotland, which now operates under the name of the Care Inspectorate.

Any proposals to change the powers of the parliamentary ombudsman and bodies through secondary legislation must be initiated by the Scottish Parliamentary Corporate Body.
