= Care Quality Commission =

Non-departmental public body in England

- Abbreviation: CQC
- Formation: April 2009; 17 years ago
- Type: Non-departmental public body
- Legal status: Operational
- Headquarters: 2 Redman Place; Stratford; London, E20 1JQ
- Coordinates: 51.5426°N 0.0115°W
- Region served: England
- Chief Executive: Dr. Arun Chopra
- Interim Chief Inspector of Healthcare: Chris Dzikiti
- Interim Chief Inspector of Adult Social Care and Integrated Care: James Bullion
- Budget: £207M total operating income (2020/21)
- Staff: 3,063 FTE (2020/21)
- Website: www.cqc.org.uk

- Applies to: England
- Relates to: Health and social care inspection

Other UK counterparts
- Northern Ireland: Regulation and Quality Improvement Authority
- Scotland: Care Inspectorate; Healthcare Improvement Scotland
- Wales: Healthcare Inspectorate Wales; Care Inspectorate Wales

The Care Quality Commission (CQC) is an executive non-departmental public body of the UK Government's Department of Health and Social Care. It was established in 2009 to regulate and inspect health and social care providers in England. It was formed from three predecessor organisations:

- the Healthcare Commission
- the Commission for Social Care Inspection
- the Mental Health Act Commission

The CQC's stated role is to make sure that hospitals, care homes, dental and general practices and other care services in England provide people with safe, effective and high-quality care, and to encourage those providers to improve. It carries out this role through checks during the registration process which all new care services must complete, as well as through inspections and monitoring of a range of data sources that can indicate problems with services.

Part of the commission's remit is protecting the interests of people whose rights have been restricted under the Mental Health Act.

== History ==
Until 31 March 2009, regulation of health and adult social care in England was carried out by the Healthcare Commission and the Commission for Social Care Inspection, and the Mental Health Act Commission had monitoring functions with regard to the operation of the Mental Health Act 1983. The Care Quality Commission was established as an integrated regulator for England's health and adult social care services by the Health and Social Care Act 2008 to replace these three bodies. The commission was created in shadow form on 1 October 2008 and began operating on 1 April 2009.

In an internal report to the CQC's audit committee revealed by the Health Service Journal in July 2014, it was reported that the commission had employed 134 applicants in 2012 who "failed some or all of its recruitment activities". Of that group, 121 were still in post. The report said: "This in essence implies that our regulatory judgments may be impaired as we have not always appointed staff with the core competencies required to do the job properly, and they may not have received appropriate training to bring them up to the standard required." In the same month, the chief executive at the time, David Behan, said that recruiting extra inspectors was taking longer than expected due to the "high standards" set for new recruits. As a result, some teams were operating at 50% capacity. In response to this situation the number of inspections scheduled for the second half of 2014 was scaled back.

In August 2013 the CQC stated that it was finding it difficult to meet their inspection target of GP practices and had therefore drafted in 'bank' inspectors and authorised staff overtime to deal with the backlog. A report of the CQC board in December 2014 showed the organisation had 852 full-time equivalent inspectors in post but a target of 1,411 by December 2015 – the number needed to "discharge the commitments that we've made in our business plan". One of the CQC's priorities set out in its strategy for 2016 to 2021 was to make greater use of data indicators and intelligence in regulating services.

In July 2024, the CQC was described as a "failing organisation" by the Secretary of State for Health and Social Care, Wes Streeting, in response to an interim report written by Penny Dash, who had been charged earlier in the year (by the previous Conservative government) with investigating the capacity and performance of the commission. Dash's full report was issued in October 2024, and a second report on the wider picture affecting the quality of care in England is due for publication in 2025.

== Organisation ==
=== Board ===
- Chair: Baroness Julia Neuberger
- Interim CEO: Dr. Arun Chopra

==== Chief inspectors ====
The commission has three chief inspectors (two of which are vacant):

- James Bullion, Interim Chief Inspector of Adult Social Care and Integrated Care

==== Non-executive ====
The Commission's board also contains a number of non-executive directors.

=== Previous board members ===
Previous board members have included:

- Chief executive: Cynthia Bower, 2009–2012
- Chief executive: David Behan, 2012–2018
- Chair: David Prior, 2013–2015; Jo Williams, 2010–2012; Barbara Young, Baroness Young of Old Scone, 2008–2009.
- Sir Mike Richards: chief inspector of hospitals, 2013–2017
- Andrea Sutcliffe: chief inspector for social care, 2013–2018

== Operations ==
In October 2014 Field announced that the commission was going to begin inspecting health systems across whole geographical areas from 2015, including social care and NHS 111. There are suggestions that it could inspect clinical commissioning groups.

Behan admitted in March 2015 that the commission would not be able to inspect all acute trusts before the end of 2015 as it had intended. In February 2015, it reported that it was missing its targets for following up on the safeguarding information it received that might indicate that patients are at risk. He also said the CQC would update its oversight in line with the growth of new provider models and would begin looking at care quality along pathways to a greater degree and, for the first time, across localities.

The organisation failed to meet its inspection targets during the second quarter of 2015–16. 70% of adult social care inspections had been undertaken and 61% of primary medical services. An exception to this was inspections of hospital acute services where targets were slightly exceeded, an additional two inspections having been made in this sector.

In December 2015 the Public Accounts Committee (PAC) was critical of the regulator, and said that it was "behind where it should be, six years after it was established". Meg Hillier MP, the chair of the PAC, noted that reports prepared by the CQC contained many errors; one foundation trust said that their staff had found more than 200 errors in a draft CQC report. Hillier said "The fact these errors were picked up offers some reassurance, but this is clearly unacceptable from a public body in which taxpayers are placing their trust."

In July 2016 the commission issued an apology after admitting that up to 500 Disclosure and Barring Service (DBS) certificates submitted by applicants to become registered managers and providers had been lost during a planned office refurbishment; a locked filing cabinet had been incorrectly marked up to be taken away and destroyed.

In the period of August 2016 to January 2017 the CQC sent questionnaires to inpatients of NHS hospitals who had been service users in the month of July 2016. 77,850 surveys were sent out.

In October 2016, a briefing paper issued by the organisation stated that no directorate was meeting objectives for producing reports on time. Of services which had been inspected over half had not improved their rating when re-inspected, with 45% staying at the same rating and 10% having a lower rating.

Following the cyber attacks on NHS systems in May 2017 it was announced that the CQC will be asking probing questions to assess data security as part of its inspection process.

After the Grenfell Tower fire in June 2017 letters were sent to around 17,000 care homes, hospitals and hospices requesting that they review fire safety processes, paying particular attention to the safety of service users who were more vulnerable due to mobility issues or learning disabilities.

In March 2018 the Public Accounts Committee reported that although the regulator had "improved significantly" there was "no room for complacency" in the organisation which had "persistent weaknesses and looming challenges". Whilst there had been improvements in the timeliness of hospital inspection reports since 2015, only 25% of reports on hospitals where less than 3 services were inspected were published within the target of 50 days. It was intended that 90% of reports should meet the target. The PAC also noted that GPs had felt burdened by the CQC's regulation practices. In response Behan stated that he accepted the committee's recommendations and did not underestimate the task at hand.

In July 2018, the CQC stated that 96 safeguarding concerns had not been passed on to local authorities over the last 12 months. Andrea Sutcliffe, acting chief executive of the CQC said that an urgent review was carried out when the issue was discovered and it was found that "none of these referrals contained information about immediate risk of severe harm to people". Sutcliffe apologised for the error and said an independent investigation "will assist us in ensuring we improve our systems to avoid something like this happening again". In October 2018 CQC's Chief Executive Ian Trenholm stated that he wanted to make the information held by the organisation more widely available to the public and that he also intended to make CQC an easier organisation to do business with and a better place to work. A chief digital officer was to be appointed as part of this process. In January 2019 it was announced that Mark Sutton would take on the role of chief digital officer from April 2019.

In April 2019 a study by the University of York published in the Journal of Health Services Research and Policy studied rates of falls which led to harm and pressure ulcers in more than 150 hospitals following CQC inspections. Rates of improvements in these criteria slowed after the inspections. Lead researcher Ana Cristina Castro stated that the inspection regime "creates a significant pressure on staff before and during the inspection period, and also significant costs, not just of the CQC inspectors but also the NHS staff who are diverted from other activities." They suggested a less resource-intensive approach should be adopted. A spokesman from the CQC responded: "To use rates of reported falls and pressure ulcers in isolation to determine CQC's impact is a crude measure and presents an overly simplistic view that is not borne out in the quality and safety improvements we have seen through our hospital inspections. It also fails to recognise that increased reporting of such incidents may be a result of an improved risk management and a stronger learning culture." They also said the research was based on a limited sample of inspections which took place over five years ago.

In August 2019 the Avon and Wiltshire Mental Health Partnership NHS Trust was fined £80,000 as a result of a prosecution brought to court by the CQC. This followed the fall of a patient from a hospital roof which led to serious injury. The service had been warned of the potential risk in 2011. A spokesman for the trust said they were working with NHS England to make improvements.

In September 2019 the Barking, Havering and Redbridge University Hospitals Trust stated their inspection by the CQC had become drawn out "due to availability of inspectors". In response, the CQC's deputy chief inspector of hospitals Nigel Acheson said that the inspection "remains within the published CQC timeframes for inspection." The inspection began on 3 September and is expected to be completed in mid November.

In October 2019 Professor Ted Baker, the Chief Inspector of Hospitals at the CQC stated that "little progress" has been made on improving patient safety in the NHS over the last 20 years. In the same month the CQC published their State of Care report. This stated that 44% of A&E departments were rated as requiring improvement and 8% were rated as being inadequate. 36% of NHS Hospitals were given ratings of requiring improvement on safety with 3% considered inadequate in that area. Over the previous five years the 18-week waiting list for planned hospital treatment had increased from involving 3 million patients to 4.4 million.

In March 2020 it was announced that most inspections would continue as planned following the outbreak of the coronavirus, and that this position would be kept under review. It was subsequently announced on 16 March that routine inspections were being temporarily paused, however the CQC continued to respond to concerns raised by staff. In October 2020 the Department of Health asked the CQC to investigate the use of Do Not Resuscitate (DNACPR) decisions early in the COVID-19 pandemic, when blanket DNACPR decisions were applied to all care home residents without considering individual circumstances.

In March 2024, it was announced that psychotherapist Sue Evans, who was the first to raise concerns about Gender Identity Development Service at the Tavistock and Portman NHS Foundation Trust when she worked there in 2005, along with a parent of a fifteen-year-old, were challenging the CQC in the High Court over its decision to register the Gender Plus Hormone Clinic, accusing the CQC of breaching its statutory duties under the Health and Social Care Act 2008. This challenge was rejected in July 2025, with Justice Eady satisfied that the steps taken by the CQC during its assessment were "rationally focused" and had "patient safety foremost in mind".

== Services regulated by the CQC ==
The CQC regulates providers of "health or social care in, or in relation to, England", where:

- "Health care" includes all forms of health care provided for individuals, whether relating to physical or mental health, and also includes procedures that are similar to forms of medical or surgical care but are not provided in connection with a medical condition.
- "Social care" includes all forms of personal care and other practical assistance provided for individuals who by reason of age, illness, disability, pregnancy, childbirth, dependence on alcohol or drugs, or any other similar circumstances, are in need of such care or other assistance.

— Health and Social Care Act 2008, section 9

While the Health and Social Care Act 2008 does not distinguish between types of health or social care service, in practice, the CQC has different regulatory approaches for:

- Ambulances – NHS and independent services
- Care homes – including residential and nursing homes
- Clinics – including family planning and slimming clinic
- Community-based services – including substance misuse and learning disability services
- Dentists – over 10,000 dental services
- GPs and doctors – GP surgeries, walk-in centres and out-of-hours care
- Hospices – end-of-life care and care of people with life-limiting illness
- Hospitals – NHS and independent hospitals
- Mental health – services for people with mental health issues including detained patients
- Services in the home – care home agencies, mobile doctors and services provided over the phone

Cross-sector inspections

- Children's services – co-operative inspections of children's health services
- Defence Medical Services – co-operative inspections of military medical treatment facilities
- Secure settings – co-operative inspections of prisons
- Urgent and emergency care systems – inspection of A&E and other urgent care services

== Hospital inspections ==
=== Basildon and Thurrock University Hospitals NHS Foundation Trust ===
In November 2009 Barbara Young, then the CQC chair, resigned from the commission when a report detailing poor standards at Basildon and Thurrock University Hospitals NHS Foundation Trust was leaked to the media. The report found that "hundreds of people had died needlessly due to appalling standards of care." One month earlier the commission had rated the quality of care at the hospital as "good."

=== Grant Thornton report ===
In August 2012, chief executive David Behan commissioned a report by management consultants Grant Thornton. The report examined the CQC's response to complaints about baby and maternal deaths and injuries at Furness General Hospital in Barrow-in-Furness, Cumbria and was instigated by a complaint from a member of the public and "an allegation of a "cover-up" submitted by a whistleblower at CQC." It was published on 19 June 2013.

Among the findings, the CQC was "accused of quashing an internal review that uncovered weaknesses in its processes" and had allegedly "deleted the review of their failure to act on concerns about University Hospitals of Morecambe Bay NHS Trust." One CQC employee claimed that he was instructed by a senior manager "to destroy his review because it would expose the regulator to public criticism." The report concluded: "We think that the information contained in the [deleted] report was sufficiently important that the deliberate failure to provide it could properly be characterised as a 'cover-up'." David Prior, who joined the commission as chairman in January 2013, responded that the organisation's previous management had been "totally dysfunctional" and admitted that the organisation was "not fit for purpose."

On 20 June 2013, Behan and Prior agreed to release the names of previously redacted senior managers within the Grant Thornton report, who it is alleged had suppressed the internal CQC report. The people named were former CQC Chief Executive Cynthia Bower, deputy CEO Jill Finney and media manager Anna Jefferson. All were reportedly present at a meeting where deletion of a critical report was allegedly discussed. Bower and Jefferson immediately denied being involved in a cover-up. The Guardian newspaper reported on 19 June 2013 that Tim Farron MP had written to the Metropolitan Police asking them to investigate the alleged cover-up.

Following an investigation, CQC found that Jefferson had not been party to any alleged 'delete' instruction. Jefferson was cleared of any wrong-doing and CQC apologised for the distress caused by the allegation.

Finney subsequently started litigation seeking at least £1.3 million libel damages from the CQC on the basis that the CQC's current chair David Prior and chief executive David Behan abused their power and acted maliciously in publishing allegations that she ordered a "cover-up" of its failings. The Grant Thornton report said it was "more likely than not" that Ms Finney had ordered the deletion of an internal report by Louise Dineley, the CQC's head of regulatory risk. The CQC started litigation against Grant Thornton claiming a contribution towards any "damages, interests and/or costs" incurred in the case.

== Social care ==
Residential establishments, unlike hospitals, can easily be closed, or sold, and reopened with a new identity. Private Eye reported in November 2015 that most of the 34 homes closed during Cynthia Bower's tenure after failing their inspection later reopened with a new name or under new ownership, but with similar problems. The campaigning charity Compassion in Care told the magazine that if a home changed name or ownership it was then listed by the CQC as "new services" and "uninspected", and there was no link to reports on the same establishment under different ownership, even if the new owners were linked to the previous owners, and there was no follow-up inspection if problems had been identified. They had found 152 homes re-registered as new, when they had only changed owner or name. The commission had identified safety concerns in more than 40% of the homes it had inspected, and 10% were rated as inadequate.

In April 2016, it was reported that 44% of care homes in the South East inspected over an 18-month period were rated as inadequate or requiring improvement. Only 0.9% of the 1200 homes inspected were rated as outstanding. In September 2016 the CQC said that 40% of nursing homes in the country were rated as "requiring improvement" or "inadequate".

It is a legal requirement for homes to clearly display their CQC ratings on their websites, but a July 2017 survey carried out by Which? found that 27% of care homes surveyed either completely failed to display them or placed them where they were very difficult to find.

As of September 2018, the CQC rated almost 3,000 out of 14,975 care homes in England as inadequate or needing improvement. The care home Horncastle House was closed by CQC in September 2018 as an urgent enforcement action to protect residents.

In November 2018 the CQC had rated 1% of adult social care providers as inadequate, 17% as requiring improvement, 79% as good and 3% as outstanding in that year.

A 2021 review of 20 care homes in England found that a good or outstanding CQC rating was associated with a better quality of life for residents. High staff wages were linked with better CQC ratings, and short-staffed homes were linked with worse CQC ratings.

=== Criticism ===
Michelle Fenwick, the director of Heritage Healthcare Franchising, complained in December 2019 that the fees charged to home care providers, which are proposed to be based on the number of clients supported, were unfair and the service was poor. It could take more than four months for a new service to be registered. She complained that assessments were too subjective. The commission has also been accused of being a barrier to innovation and impeding a shift to digital services because they insisted on paper records, and there were claims that some inspectors did not understand electronic records.

=== Winterbourne View ===
Winterbourne View was a private hospital at Hambrook, South Gloucestershire, owned and operated by Castlebeck. It was exposed in a Panorama investigation into physical and psychological abuse suffered by people with learning disabilities and challenging behaviour, first broadcast in 2011. One senior nurse had reported his concerns directly to CQC, but his complaint was not taken up. The public funded hospital was shut down as a result of the abuse that took place. Cynthia Bower, then the chief executive of the commission, resigned ahead of a critical government report in which Winterbourne View was cited.

=== Ash Court ===
Ash Court is a residential nursing home for the elderly in London, operated by Forest Healthcare. In April 2012 hidden camera footage was broadcast in a BBC Panorama exposé which showed an elderly woman being physically assaulted at Ash Court by a male carer and mistreated by four others. The standard of care at the nursing home had been rated "excellent." The victim was an 81-year-old woman with Alzheimer's disease and severe arthritis. Although the commission's primary function is to enforce national standards including safeguarding the vulnerable and "enabling them to live free from harm, abuse and neglect" the CQC responded by stating that they "should not be criticised for failing to protect people from harm" and could not be expected to spot abuse "which often takes place behind closed doors".

=== Whorlton Hall ===
Whorlton Hall is a private hospital in County Durham which had previously been owned by the same company as Winterbourne View. An undercover investigation by the BBC Panorama programme found evidence that vulnerable clients with autism or learning difficulties were physically and verbally abused by staff. Patients were also physically restrained. The current owners of the service, Cygnet, have stated that all patients have now been transferred to other hospitals. The service had been visited at least 100 times by official agencies in the year before the abuse was found out, including visits by the Care Quality Commission, Durham council and local NHS bodies. It has since been closed.

A former CQC inspector Barry Stanley-Wilkinson has alleged that he had raised concerns about a "very poor culture" at the service in 2015. Stanley-Wilkinson said that he worked at the CQC for a decade and that this was the only report he had written which was not published. In response the CQC stated that reports went through a "rigorous peer review process" and the draft report "did not raise any concerns about abusive practice". They also said: "We are in the process of commissioning a review into what we could have done differently or better in our regulation of Whorlton Hall and these allegations will be fully investigated as part of this. We will update on the progress and findings of this review in our Public Board meetings." On 10 June 2019, the CQC released a previously unpublished report from 2015 on the service where it was given a rating of "requires improvement".

Ten workers have been arrested by Durham Police and have been questioned about the alleged abuse and neglect of the patients.

== Primary care ==
In January 2015, the commission for the first time took action in respect of primary care. Three GP practices were put into special measures after unsatisfactory inspection results.

== Funding ==
The budget for 2015/6 was £249 million, but is to be reduced to £236 million for 2016/7. It is anticipated that by 2019/20 the budget will be £217 million. It had a budget of £1.1 million for "travel and subsistence" for hospital inspections in 2014–15, but actually spent £4.4 million. In response to a Freedom of Information request in November 2015 it was stated that CQC have a database support contract with Computacenter which costs approximately £700,000 per annum; the contract expires in September 2016 with the option of a 1-year extension.

Substantial increases are expected in future years as it moves to a full cost recovery basis. NHS Providers described the decision to increase fees as "regrettable". For 2016/7 fees will increase by 75% as its government funding is reduced by 25%. The increase in fee levels has been criticised by the Registered Nursing Home Association (RNHA), Care England and the Voluntary Organisations Disability Group (VODG).

Fees relate to the size and type of organisation and have been increased on a yearly basis:

CQC fees
Year	GP practice on one site with 5,000-10000 patients	NHS Trust, with turnover between £125 million and £225 million	Care home 26–30 residents	Home care provider
2015/6	£725	£78,208	£761	
2016/7	£2,574	£136,864	£4212	£1,369
2017/8	£4,526	£202,239	£4,375	£2,192

However, in October 2020 it was announced that the fees for 2021/22 would remain the same as 2019/20. The commission stated that as they are only required to consult when there is a change to their fees scheme there would not be a consultation this year.

== Related issues ==
- Criticism of the National Health Service

== See also ==
- Regulation and Quality Improvement Authority (Northern Ireland)
- Healthcare Improvement Scotland
- Healthcare Inspectorate Wales
- Care Inspectorate (Scotland)
- Care Inspectorate Wales
