= Sheffield Medical School =

Medical school in Sheffield, South Yorkshire, England

Coordinates: 53.378°N 1.493°W

University of Sheffield Medical School
- Coat of arms
- Motto: Latin: Ars longa vita brevis
- Motto in English: Art is long, life is short
- Type: Medical school
- Established: 1828 – Sheffield School of Practical Anatomy and Medicine
- Parent institution: University of Sheffield
- Dean: Mark Strong
- Head of Faculty: Ashley Blom
- Students: Over 2,000
- Location: Sheffield, South Yorkshire, England
- Website: sheffield.ac.uk/medicine

The University of Sheffield Medical School is a medical school based at the University of Sheffield in Sheffield, South Yorkshire, England. The school traces its history back to at least 1828. It operated independently until its merger with Firth College and Sheffield Technical School in 1897, and is now an integral part of Sheffield's Faculty of Health.

The medical school consists of three divisions: Clinical Medicine, Population Health, and Neuroscience, and is active in three fields of medicine: teaching, researching and practising.

Sheffield was ranked 12th in the UK in clinical, pre-clinical and health in the Times Higher Education World University Rankings 2020. As of 2020, its five-year MBChB programme admits 273 home students and a further 18 overseas students per year. It is a founding member of the UCAT consortium and one of 32 bodies entitled by the General Medical Council to award medical degrees in the UK.

== History ==
=== First medical school in Sheffield ===
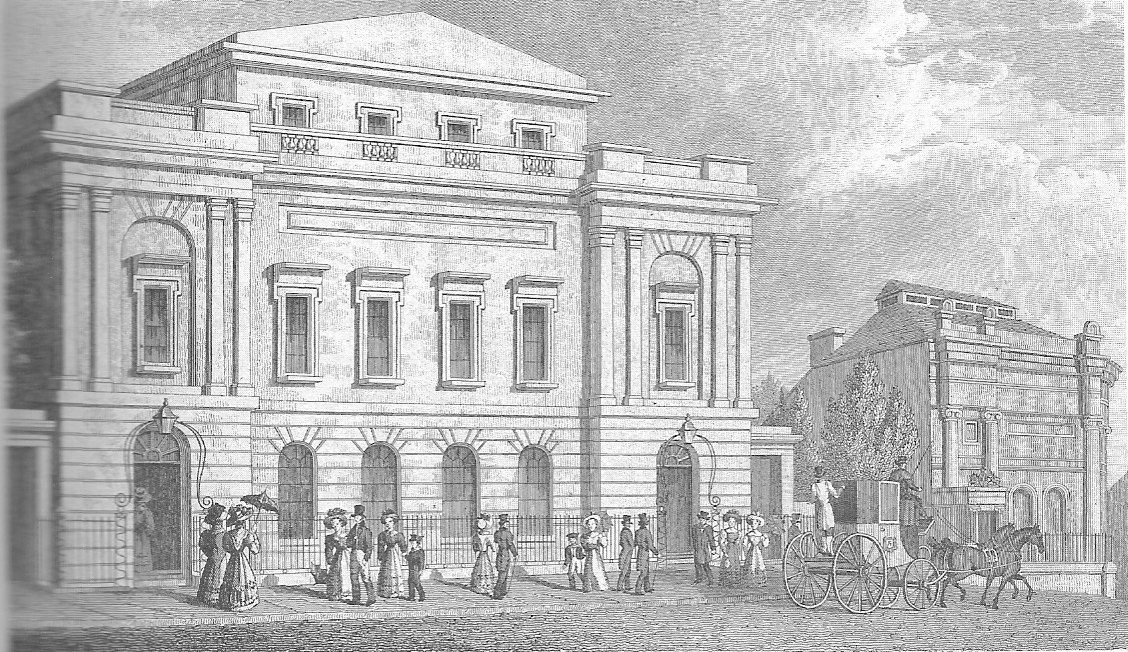
Engraving of Surrey Street in Sheffield in c. 1830. The Sheffield Medical Institution is on the right of the image.

Surgeon apothecary Hall Overend started medical teaching in Sheffield as early as 1811. Medical training was then unstructured due to apprenticeship until the Apothecaries Act 1815 came into force. The act empowered the Society of Apothecaries in London to regulate medical profession throughout England and Wales, as well as to award licence to practise, the Licentiate of the Society of Apothecaries (LSA). Although Overend was never registered with the Society of Apothecaries as a lecturer, he began to develop his own School of Practical Anatomy and Medicine in Sheffield, which became the oldest higher education establishment in the city, and one of the earliest English medical schools outside London. The school received external recognition in 1828, when its teachers were formally registered with the society. Overend taught with examples illustrating natural history, anatomy, pathology and chemistry. He also conducted demonstrations of dissection at his Church Street home, in an anatomy museum that was converted from a malt house. The cadavers used for teaching human anatomy in his school were illegally provided by resurrectionists, which was common in the 19th century. Overend presented his apprentices for the LSA since 1815 and seven of them had successfully passed the examination between 1816 and 1826. Hall Overend's son, Wilson Overend, also qualified as a lecturer with the Society of Apothecaries in 1828.

In the late 1820s, physicians and surgeons of the Sheffield General Infirmary, the first hospital in the city, stated that a medical school connected with a public hospital would have greater eligibility for recognition by the Society of Apothecaries, compared with one that run by private individuals. Arnold James Knight, a physician at the infirmary, made a motion to found a public medical school in Sheffield in 1828, which was seconded by Hall Overend. Wilson Overend took over ownership of his father's medical school at the beginning of 1829, since his father transferred his support to the new school. Wilson continued his school as Sheffield School of Anatomy and Medicine at the corner house between Eyre Street and Charles Street, until was burnt down in 1835 following a riot; the wife of the caretaker of the premises shouted out "murder" when the alleged drunk caretaker and his friend proceeded to beat her. The crowd misinterpreted the noise as the men were attempting to murder or burke the woman, broke into the building and set fire.

=== Independent medical school ===
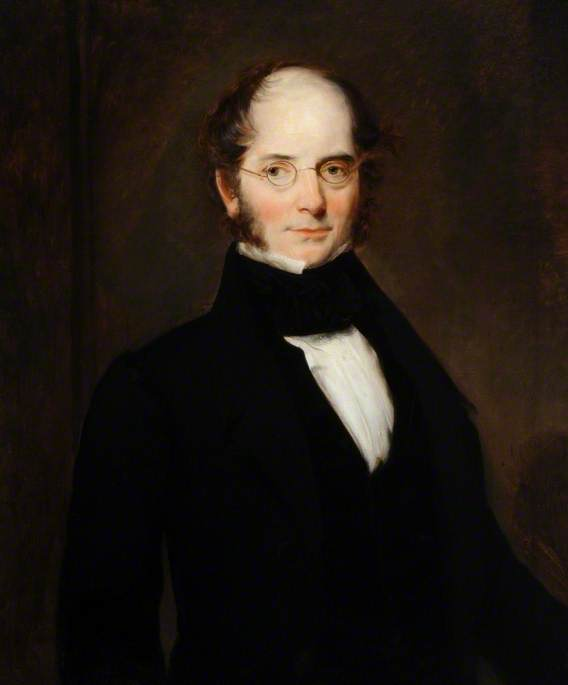
Sir Arnold Knight founded the Sheffield Medical Institution in 1829.

The new medical school was formally opened as the Sheffield Medical Institution on 2 July 1829 at the end of Surrey Street. Knight laid the foundation stone in 1829 and gave an opening lecture describing the systematic programme of medical education. Operated in a similar way to Hall Overend's school, the Sheffield Medical Institution was however corporately owned and provided facilities for doctors who were already in practice. It had a lecture room with 100 seats, a dissecting room and a museum with library. The teachers for the institution were unpaid and were drawn from the consultants at the General Infirmary, as well as at the Public Dispensary (founded in 1832 also by Knight). The Sheffield Medical Institution was renamed Sheffield Medical School in 1865, and in 1868 the Sheffield School of Medicine. Mariano Alejo Martin de Bartolomé was President of the Medical School for 22 years since 1866. Throughout the 19th century, the medical school collaborated with the Sheffield Children's Hospital and Jessop Hospital for Women to provide all the medical teaching.

The school struggled to survive and was near to closure twice in 1865 and 1882. This was caused by the resignation of the lecturers and the difficulty of recruiting new ones. There was also competition for public funds between the school and other local hospitals (including the specialist Lodge Moor Hospital and newly-founded Northern General and Nether Edge hospitals). Firth College, established in 1879 by Mark Firth, saved the medical school from collapse by taking over the teaching of all preliminary science subjects to medical students. The two local institutions hence became intertwined. In 1883, the Mayor of Sheffield and the Master Cutler (an ambassador of industry in Sheffield) appealed to the public for funds to build a new medical school building to replace the original one in Surrey Street, leading to the relocation of the Sheffield School of Medicine in 1888 from Surrey Street to a new premises on Leopold Street, opposite Firth College. The new building contained classrooms, a tiered lecture theatre, a dissecting room, a library and a museum.

In late 19th century, Principal of Firth College William Mitchinson Hicks had an ideal to bring into Sheffield a university. The first stage to accomplishing this was the union the city's higher education institutions (the medical school, Firth College and the Sheffield Technical School) into one university college. In 1897, the merger of the three institutions resulted in the University College of Sheffield. The medical school became one of its departments.

=== Medical School at the university ===
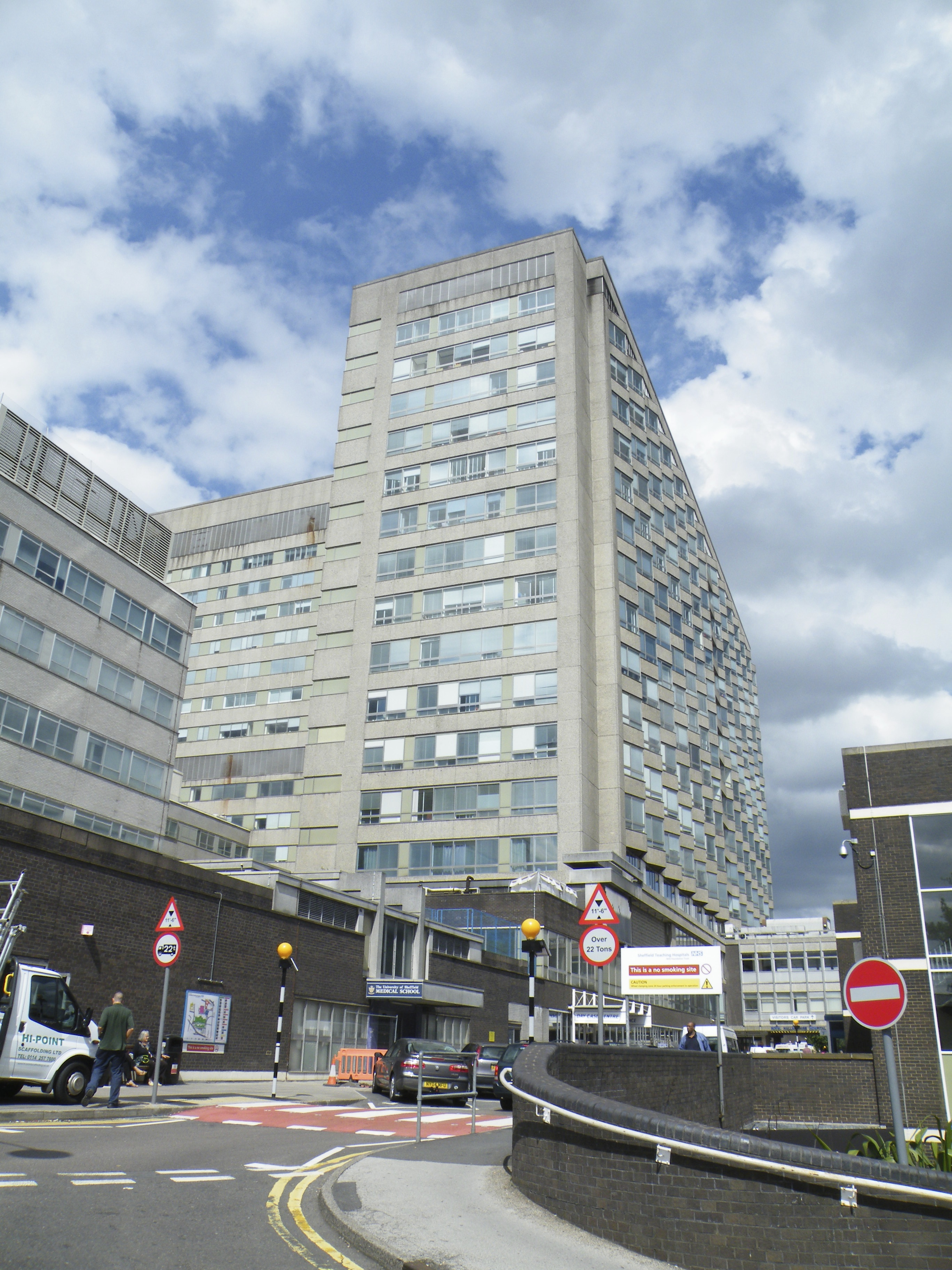
The Royal Hallamshire Hospital and the B Road entrance to the Medical School.

In 1905, the university college received its royal charter to become the University of Sheffield. Medicine was a founding faculty at the university, along with Arts, Pure Science and Applied Science. The Medical Faculty was moved from Leopold Street to the North Wing of Firth Court, which was adjacent to Back Lane where bodies could be discreetly delivered to the dissecting room. The Medical School chose red as the colour of its academic hoods in 1908. Lydia Manley Henry, enrolled in 1909, was one of the first female students admitted to the Medical School. She graduated MBChB in 1916 and was awarded an MD later in 1920.

The Medical School moved in 1973 to its current building on Beech Hill Road, adjacent to the Royal Hallamshire Hospital. Overend is now regarded as the father of medical education in Sheffield. The School of Medicine was renamed the Medical School and in 2001 School of Medicine and Biomedical Sciences, offering medicine MBChB and orthoptics BMedSci degree courses. The school changed its name back to the Medical School in 2011, and later the orthoptics course moved to the Health Sciences School of the university.

== Departments ==
=== School of Medicine and Population Health ===
Renamed from the Academic Unit of Medical Education in 2023, the School of Medicine and Population Health is an academic department of the medical school. It includes the Clinical Skills Centre, Medical Teaching Unit and the Academic Unit of Primary Medical Care. The Clinical Skills Centre, based at the Northern General Hospital, contains facility for healthcare training including mock clinical wards, resuscitation suites and high-fidelity simulation theatres. The Medical Teaching Unit (MTU) is located on the Western Bank Campus. It has 14 teaching bays, over 2,500 pathology specimens, and a large number of pre-dissected anatomical material. The MTU also has its own plastination unit for the long-term preservation of human body parts. The Academic Unit of Primary Medical Care focuses on general practice and primary care, which combines undergraduate teaching and medical research.

=== Postgraduate and research departments ===
The Medical School provides postgraduate taught (MSc and MRes) and research (MD and PhD) programmes, which are available through three departments. The Department of Infection, Immunity and Cardiovascular Disease is a research centre for immunology, cardiology and imaging. The Department of Neuroscience focuses on neurodegenerative diseases, including motor neuron disease, Parkinson's disease and Alzheimer's disease. The Department of Oncology and Metabolism organises education and research in the field of oncology, endocrinology and reproduction.

== Campus ==
Sheffield Medical School is located on Beech Hill Road attaching to the Royal Hallamshire Hospital's main Tower Blocks. The Medical School building contains 3 lecture theatres, 8 seminar rooms and group meeting spaces with a total of 110 seats. Sheffield Biorepository, a storage facility for human tissues approved under the Human Tissue Act 2004, is housed in the building. The Samuel Fox House at the Northern General Hospital is home to the school's Clinical Skills Centre and Academic Unit of Primary Medical Care. It has 3 simulated wards containing 5 bed spaces per room, simulated home for occupational therapy practice, multi-functional rooms for skills training and lecture rooms of a total of 85 seats.

=== Libraries ===
The school maintains two libraries collectively known as the Health Sciences Library. It was first opened at the Royal Hallamshire Hospital in 1978, and a branch was created at the Northern General Hospital in 1979, which was relocated to its current location in Samuel Fox House in 1998. The Health Sciences Library at the Royal Hallamshire Hospital has collections cover medicine, dentistry, nursing and midwifery, with 85 study spaces. The library at the Northern General Hospital also houses material for medicine and nursing.

=== Affiliated hospitals ===
Sheffield Medical School is associated with the following local hospitals of the Sheffield Teaching Hospitals NHS Foundation Trust and the Sheffield Children's NHS Foundation Trust:

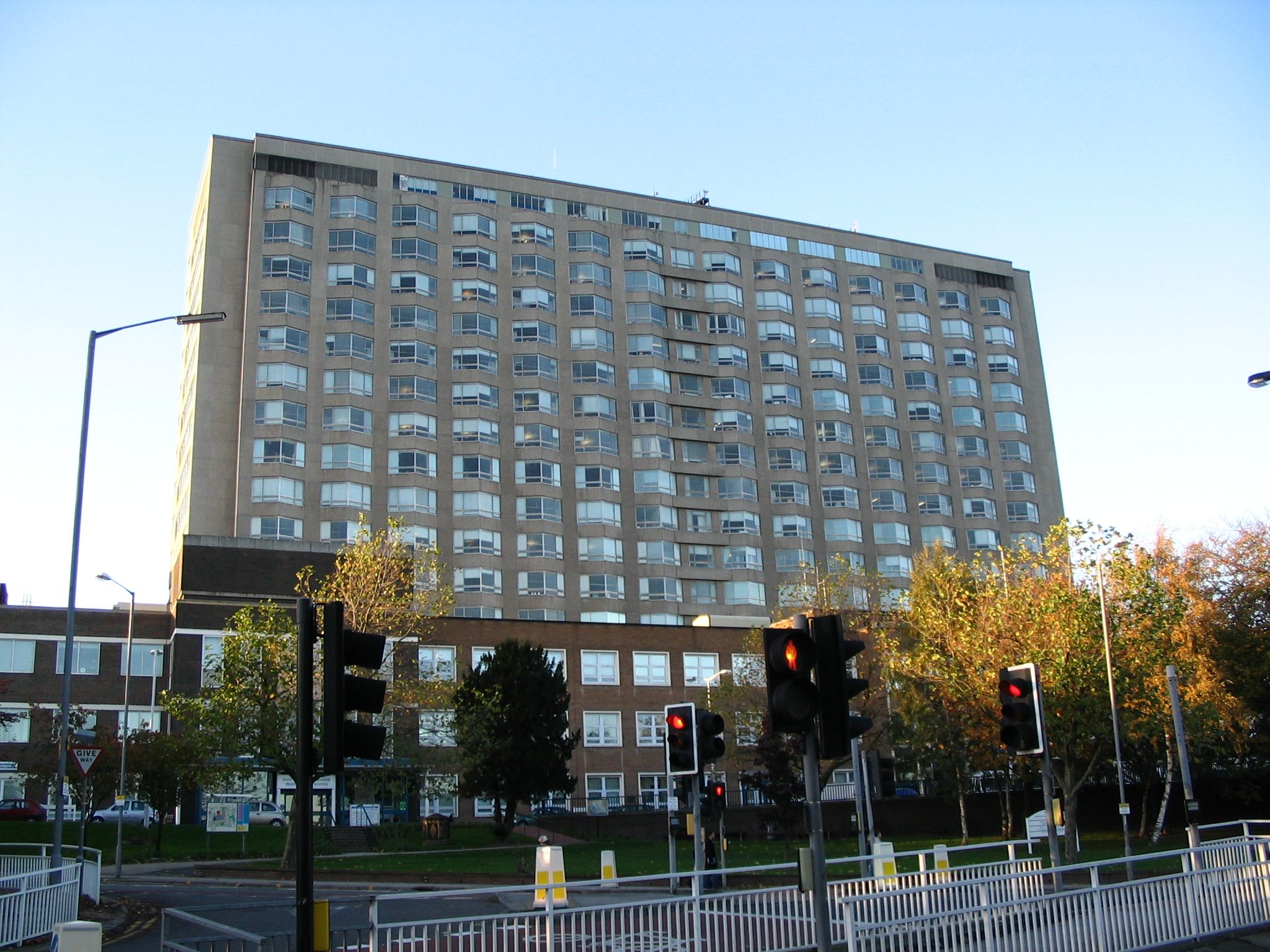
Royal Hallamshire Hospital

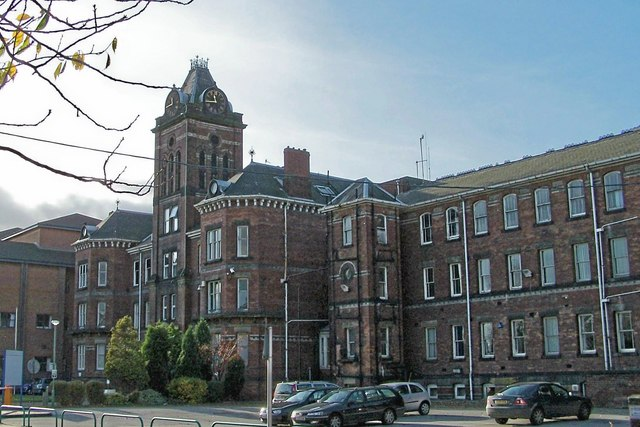
Northern General Hospital

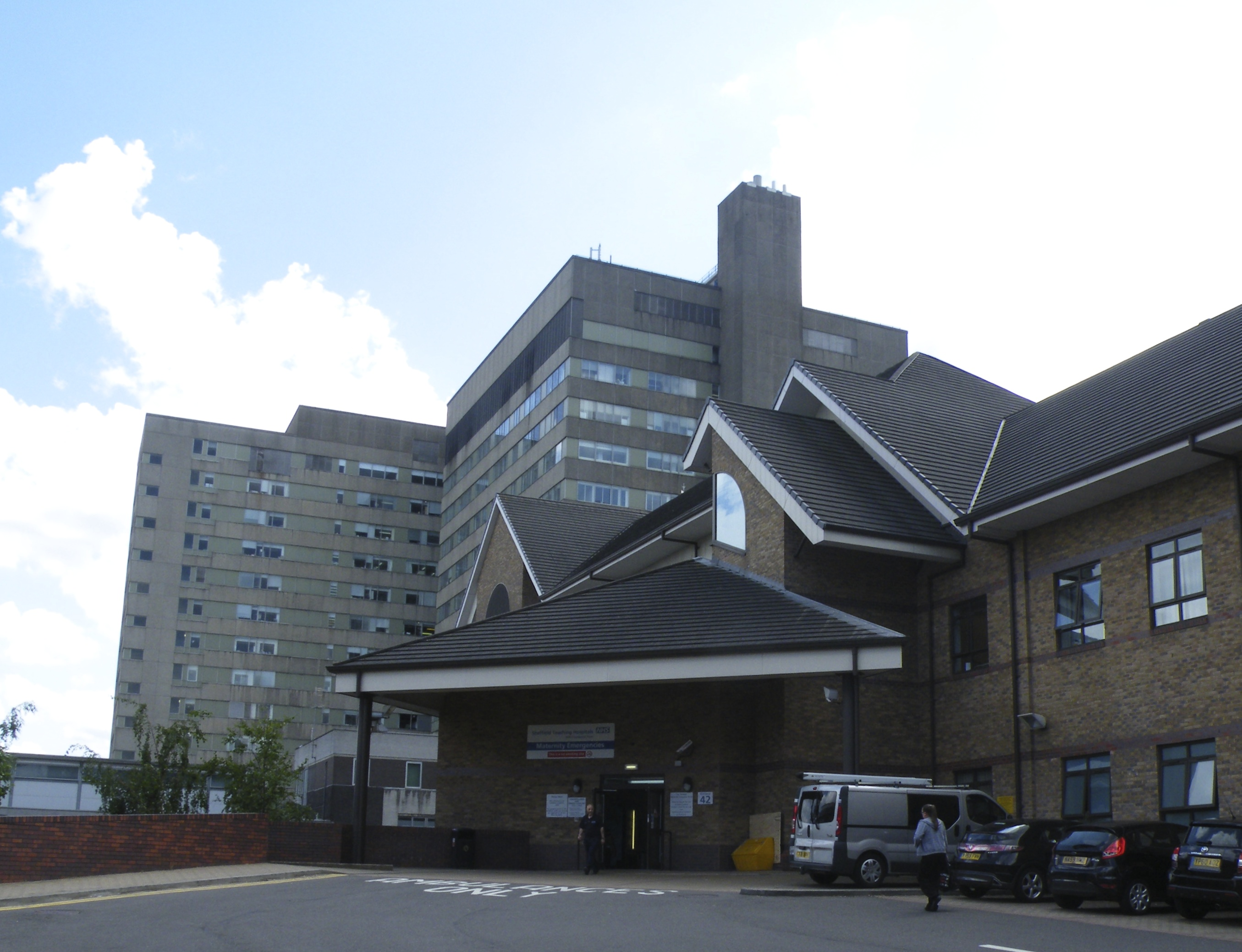
Jessop Wing

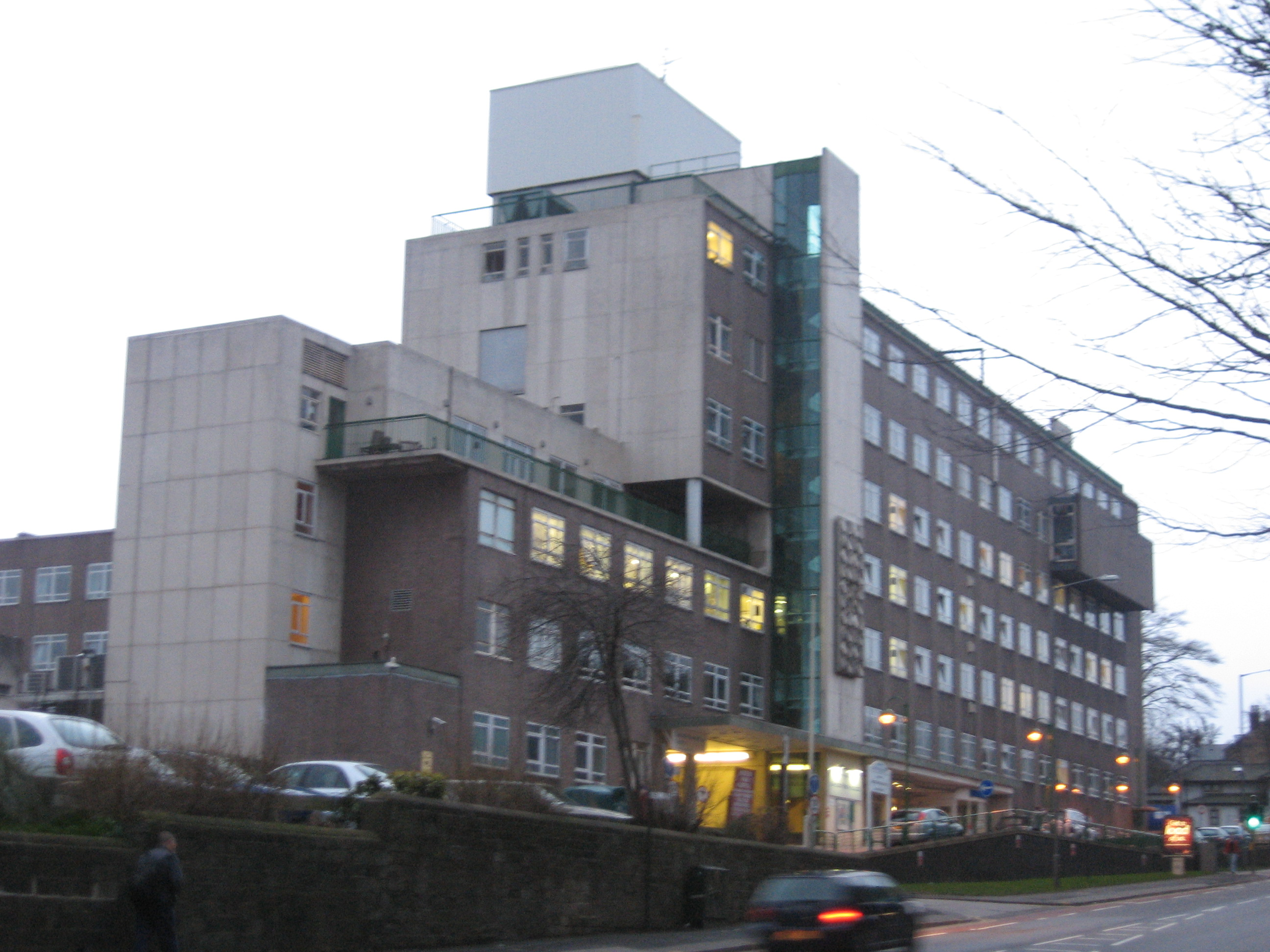
Weston Park Hospital

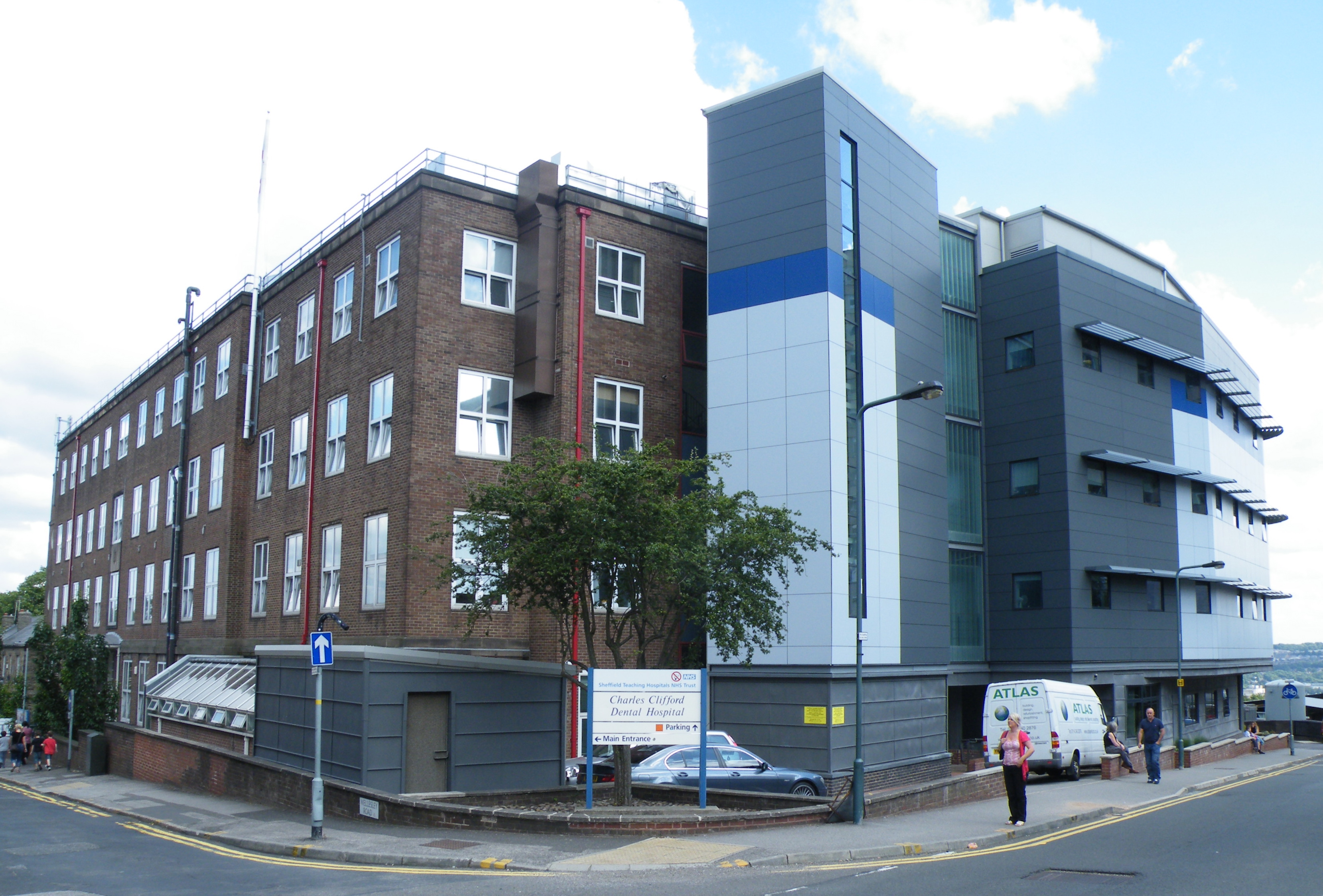
Charles Clifford Dental Hospital

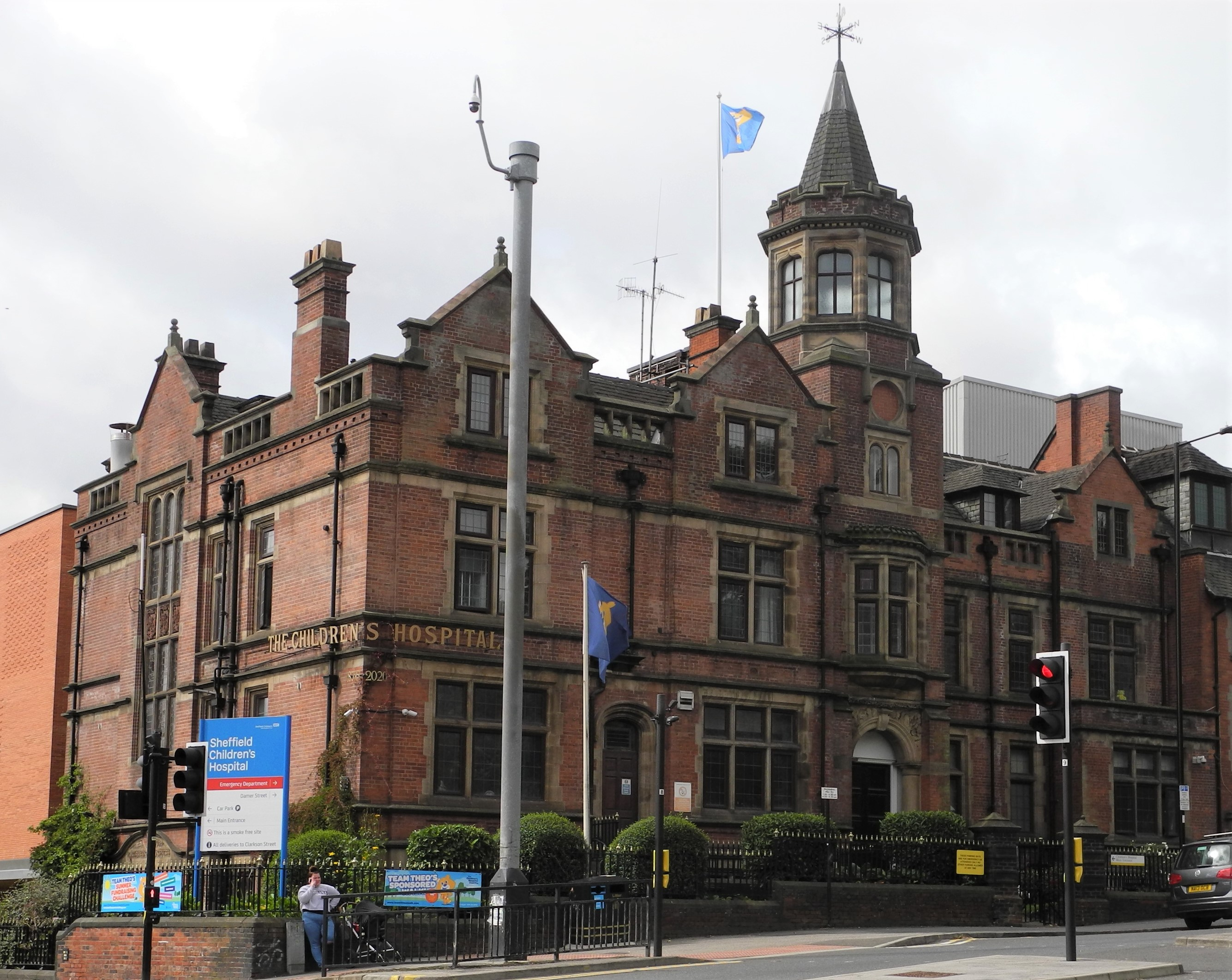
Sheffield Children's Hospital

Other Associate Teaching Hospitals of the University of Sheffield Medical School include: the Rotherham NHS Foundation Trust (Rotherham General Hospital, Rotherham Community Health Centre), the Doncaster and Bassetlaw Hospitals NHS Foundation Trust (Doncaster Royal Infirmary, Bassetlaw Hospital, Montagu Hospital) and the Barnsley Hospital NHS Foundation Trust (Barnsley Hospital).

== Academics ==
=== Teaching ===
The standard undergraduate Medicine course is a five-year programme leading to an MBChB (Medicinae Baccalaureus Chirurgiae Baccalaureus) degree. The course is divided into four phases. The structure of Phase 1 (first year) follows the General Medical Council's guidelines and focuses on the structure and function of the human body. Phase 2a (second year) starts with a six-week research project followed by training in procedural clinical skills in simulation. In Phase 2b (first half of third year), students undertake a three-week introduction to basic clinical skills and a 10-week longitudinal integrated clinical placement in one of the Sheffield's teaching hospitals. Phase 3 (second half of third year and fourth year) is clinically based. Phase 4 (final year) consists of a series of lectures and two longitudinal integrated placements in a different hospital and clinical area from Phase 2b. The school also runs a four-year graduate entry Medicine MBChB programme for graduates with a life sciences degree. Students on this course bypass Phase 1 of the five-year programme.

=== Research ===
The Medical School has currently 18 research themes, which are: bone and joint; cancer; cardiovascular disease; cerebrovascular disease; dementia; endocrinology; enhancing the potential of learners; functional neurology and epilepsy; genomic medicine and bioinformatics; imaging; immunity; infection; motor neuron disorders; Parkinson's disease; primary medical care; reproduction; social accountability; and translational neuropsychology.

The school has been associated with a number of notable medical discoveries. In the 1920s, Edward Mellanby's studies on rickets established that cod liver oil prevented the disease, which helped lead to its eradication. In the 1930s, Cecil Payne became the first to use Penicillin to effect a cure. Also in the 1930s, Sir Hans Krebs made significant advancements in the study of cellular energy, codifying his observations in the Krebs Cycle, for which work he received a Nobel Prize in 1953.

== Motto and coat of arms ==
Crest of the school on the Medical School building

The motto of the Sheffield Medical School is Ars longa vita brevis, a Latin translation of an aphorism from Aphorismi by Greek physician Hippocrates. It translates in English as "Art is long, life is short", referring to the difficulty in acquiring and practising the art of medicine. A stone carving bearing the motto was displayed on the Sheffield Medical Institution building on Surrey Street, from 1829 until the demolition of the building in 1965. The original stone is now situated close to the entrance of the medical school on Beech Hill Road.

The coat of arms of the Sheffield Faculty of Medicine was granted by the College of Arms on 12 December 2003. It features elements from the coat of arms of the University of Sheffield: the Crown of Success, two sheaves of arrows and the open books, as well as the azure background colour. The rod of Asclepius is centred on the shield. It can be seen throughout the Medical School on its buildings. A variation of the crest is used by various Sheffield Medical Society sports teams.

== Student life ==
Representing over 2000 medical students on campus, Sheffield Medical Society (MedSoc) is the largest society at the University of Sheffield Students' Union. The MedSoc has 33 academic and non-academic sub-societies as well as its own sports teams.

== Notable alumni and staff ==
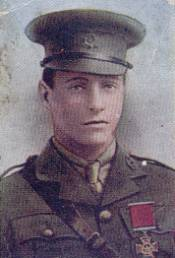
British Army medical officer William Barnsley Allen (MBChB, 1914)

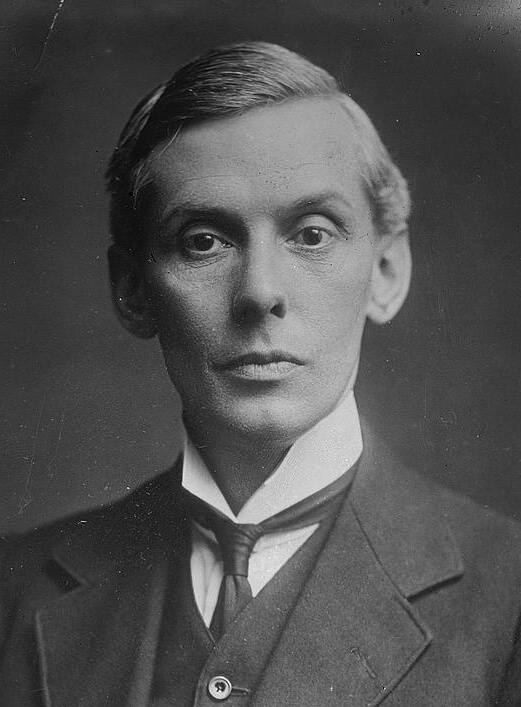
Christopher Addison, first Arthur Jackson Professor of Anatomy (1896–1901)

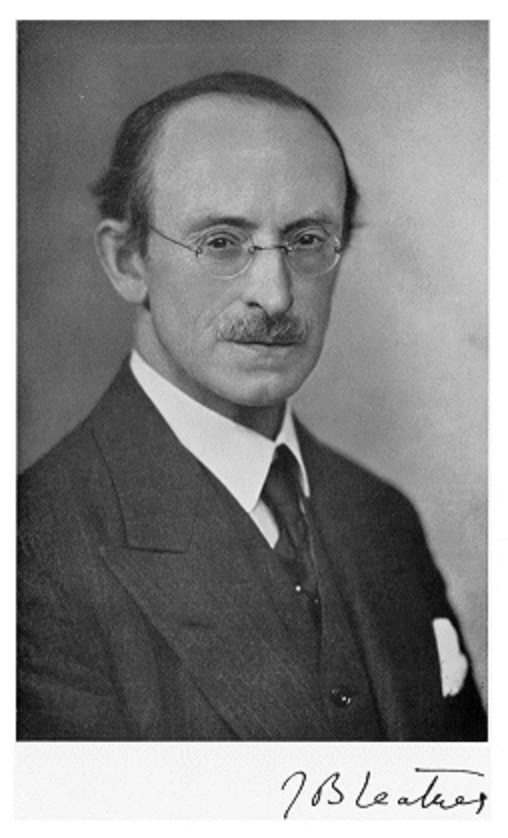
John Beresford Leathes, Professor of Physiology (1914–1933; Hon DSc, 1923)

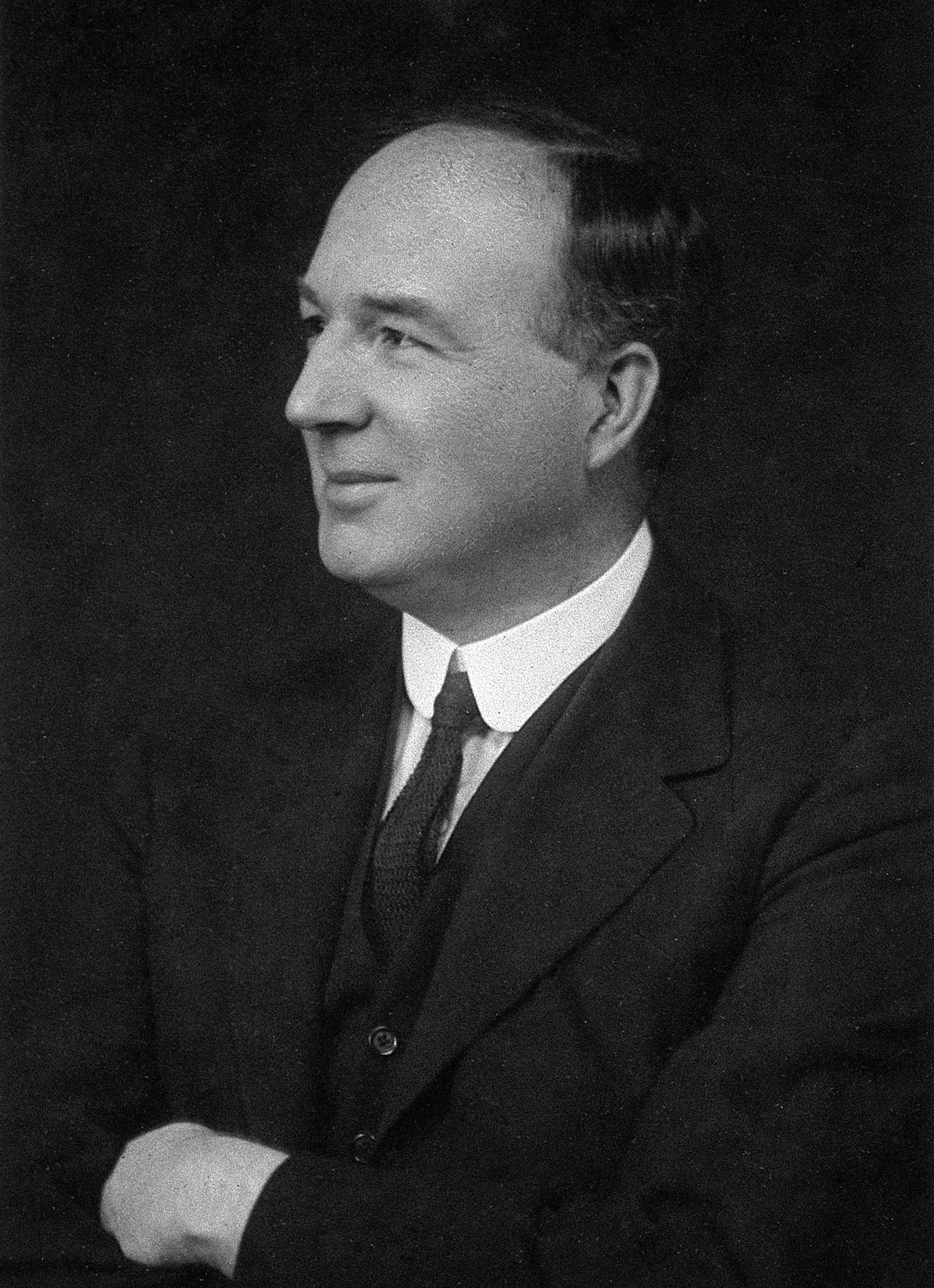
Edward Mellanby, discoverer of vitamin D, Chair in Pharmacology (1920–1933)

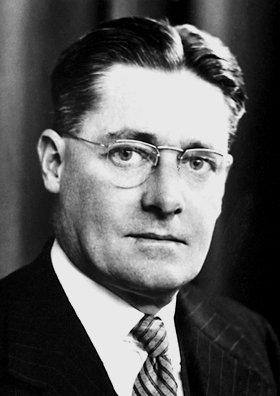
Nobel laureate Howard Florey, Joseph Hunter Chair of Pathology (1931–1935)
- Lydia Manley Henry, first female medical graduate at Sheffield (MBChB, 1916; MD, 1920)
- Robert Platt, Baron Platt of Grindleford (MB ChB, 1921; MD, 1923)
- Radiation oncologist Frank Ellis (MBChB, 1929)
- Surgeon Mike McMahon (MBChB, 1967)
- Michael Bond (MBChB, 1961; MD, 1965)
- Pamela Shaw, Professor of Neurology
- James Underwood, Professor of Pathology
- Michael Wells, Professor of Gynaecological Pathology
- Frank Woods, Sir George Franklin Professor of Medicine
- Moira Whyte, Sir George Franklin Professor of Medicine
- John Emery, Professor Associate in Paediatric Pathology (1972–1980)
- Sir Hans Krebs, biochemist.

== See also ==
- Medical school in the United Kingdom
- List of medical schools in the United Kingdom
- University of Sheffield
