= West End, Sheffield =

Coordinates: 53.381°N 1.489°W

West End
- Location within Sheffield
- Metropolitan borough: City of Sheffield
- Metropolitan county: South Yorkshire
- Region: Yorkshire and the Humber
- Country: England
- Sovereign state: United Kingdom
- Post town: Sheffield
- Postcode district: S3, S10
- Dialling code: 0114
- Police: South Yorkshire
- Fire: South Yorkshire
- Ambulance: Yorkshire
- UK Parliament: Sheffield Central

The West End is a loosely defined area of Sheffield, consisting of part of the City Centre, in addition to some of the western suburbs. The term has been in use for at least 150 years.

== Modern usage ==
In 2007, Sheffield City Council attempted to define the area as a part of the Connect Sheffield Scheme, and included the Devonshire and St George's Quarters, which are bound to the west and south-west by the ring road as well as the University Campus, which spans the ring road. The result is that today, the West End primarily refers to the area alongside Glossop Road and Western Bank, rising up to Broomhill.

It hosts the Sheffield Children's Hospital, and the former Central Sheffield University Hospitals, that is the Royal Hallamshire Hospital (and its Jessop Wing), Weston Park Hospital and the Charles Clifford Dental Hospital (now a part of the Sheffield Teaching Hospitals NHS Foundation Trust). The area also houses much of the University of Sheffield.
