= Weston Hospital =

Weston Hospital may refer to:

- Weston General Hospital, Weston-super-Mare, North Somerset, England
- Weston Park Hospital, Broomhill, Sheffield, South Yorkshire, England
- Weston State Hospital, Weston, West Virginia, United States
