= Reg Elson =

English orthopaedic surgeon (1930–2025)

Reg Elson FRCS
- Born: Reginald Arnold Elson; 1930
- Died: 22 October 2025 (aged 94–95)
- Education: Cambridge University
- Occupation: Orthopaedic surgeon
- Employer: Northern General Hospital

Reginald Arnold Elson FRCS (1930 – 22 October 2025) was a British orthopaedic surgeon, who was involved in developing hip replacement techniques.

== Life and career ==
Elson studied at Cambridge University graduating in 1954. After further training as an orthopaedic trauma surgeon he obtained in 1967 a position the Northern General Hospital in Sheffield. For a period from 1977 he worked at the EndoKlinik, Hamburg, before returning to Sheffield.

A founder of the Cavendish Hip Fellowship Trust, he also served as president of the British Hip Society from 1994 to 1996. and of the European Hip Society, of which he also was a founder.

Elson died at his home on 22 October 2025.
