= Norton Hall =

Country house in Norton, Sheffield, England

Coordinates: 53.33523°N 1.463884°W

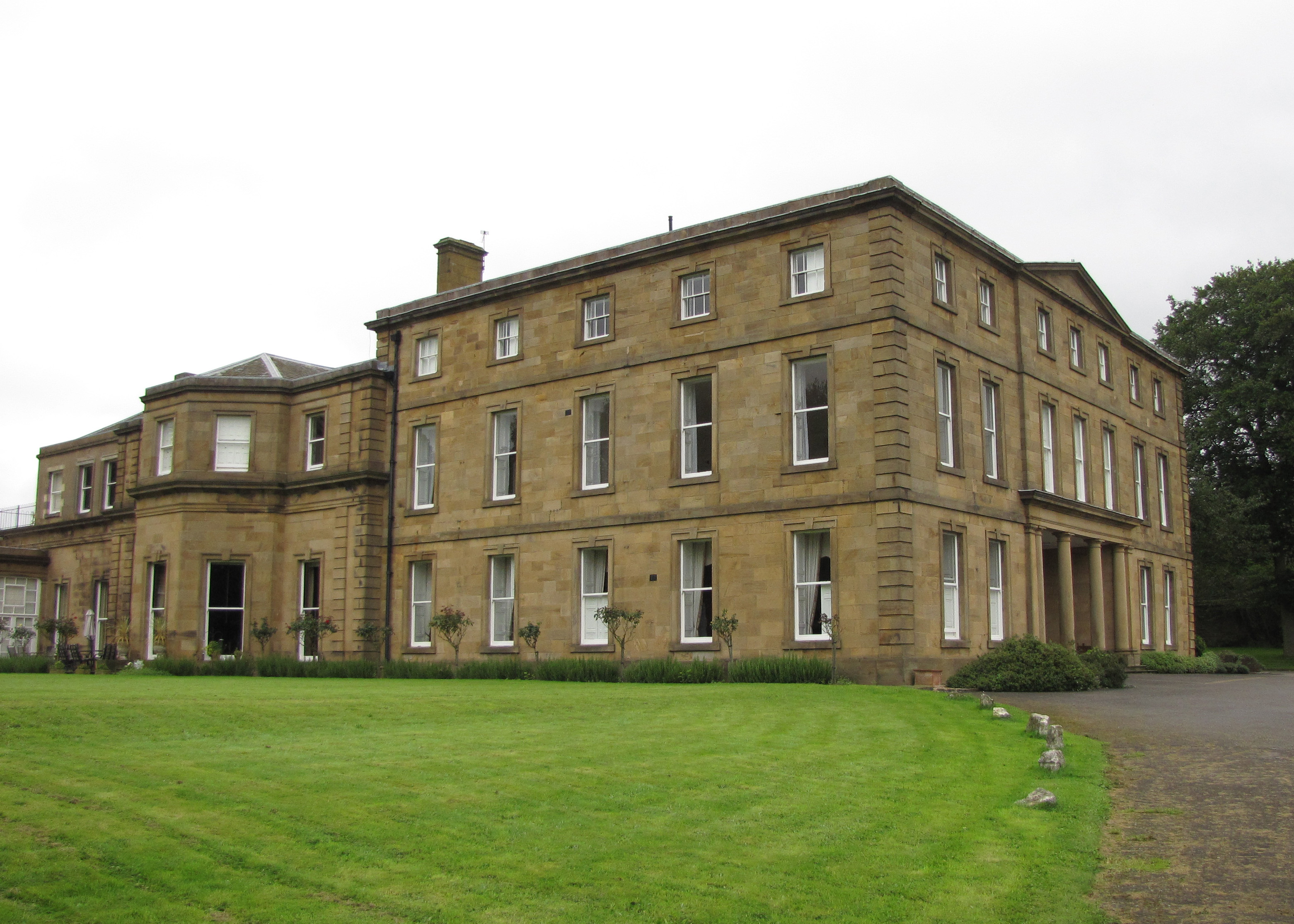

Norton Hall is an English country house situated on Norton Church Road in the suburb of Norton in Sheffield, England. For most of its history it has been a private residence, in its latter history it has been used as a NHS hospital, a private hospital and has now been converted into high quality apartments. It is a Grade II* listed building.

== History ==
=== Previous halls on the site ===
The present Norton Hall dates from 1815 but the Norton estate has great history and can be traced back to pre-conquest days with the estate being mentioned in the last will and testament of the Anglo-Saxon nobleman Wulfric Spott who died c. 1002. Modern historian Barbara A. West states that the present Norton Hall "is probably the third house on the site". In the 12th century the estate was owned by Robert FitzRanulph, the Lord of Alfreton and Norton, who funded the building of the nearby Beauchief Abbey. The FitzRanulph family remained the owners of the Norton estate until 1269, when the failure to produce a male heir meant the estate went into the hands of the Chaworth family who owned the estate for almost two hundred years until their male lineage ran out in 1458.

The house then had a succession of different owners including the Denham, Babbington, Eyre, Blythe and Bullock families. The house at this time seems to have been in the style of the traditional Elizabethan E-shaped manor house, having a principal front with projections at each end and a recess in the centre. In 1666 the Bullocks had severe monetary problems and the house and estate was sold to Cornelius Clarke who died childless and passed it on to his nephew Robert Offley. The Offleys remained for several generations, with Stephen Offley becoming High Sheriff of Derbyshire in 1716. The heiress Urith Offley married the Sheffield industrialist Samuel Shore in 1759. At this time Norton Hall was described by the Reverend George Hall in his 1815 book The History of Chesterfield as "one of those picturesque old mansions of our country gentry of the high order, of which so few remain. Some portions of it were of very high antiquity."

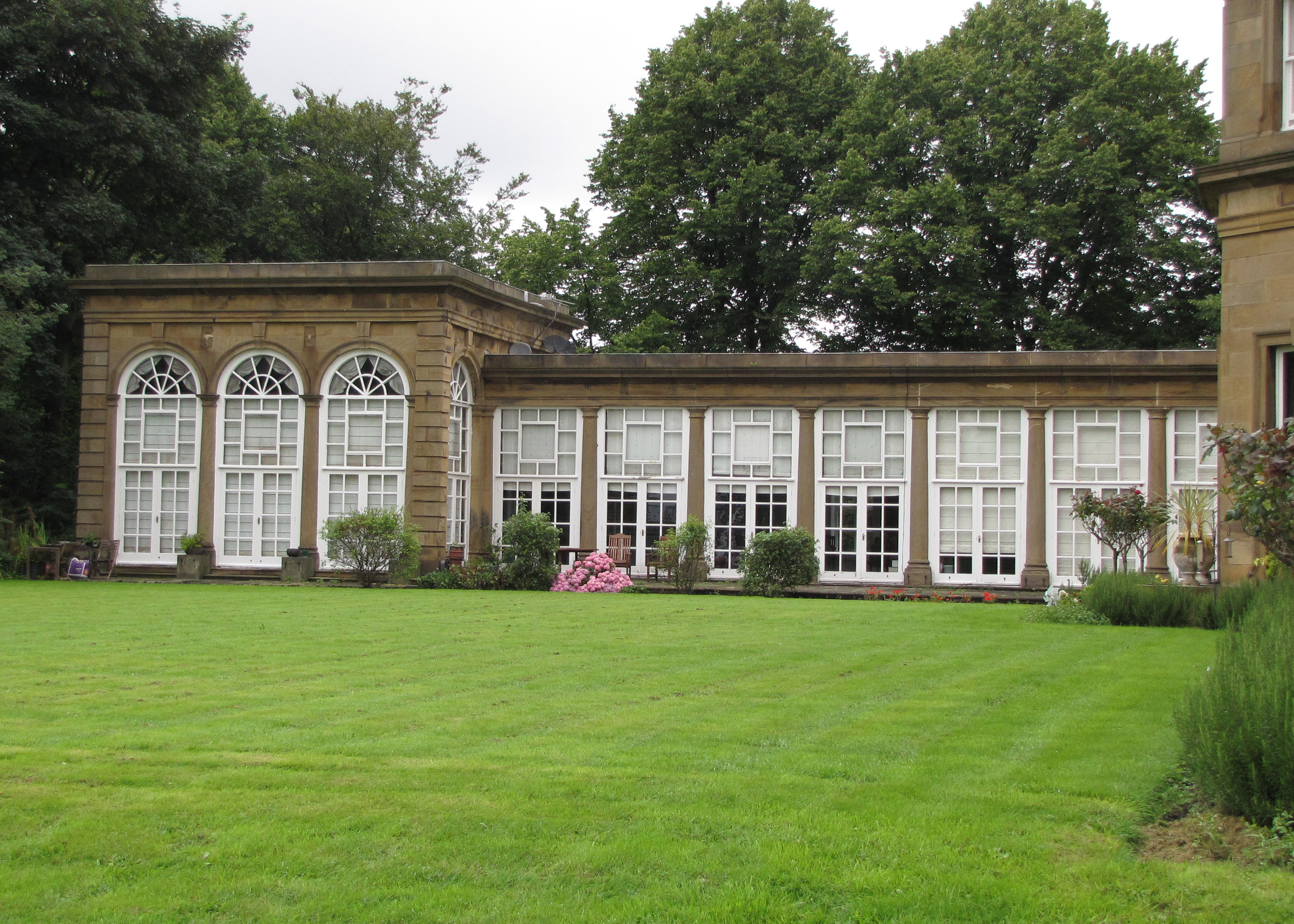
The Colonnade (right) and the taller Orangery

=== Present hall is built ===
Samuel Shore's son, also called Samuel, is responsible for the design of the hall as we see it today. He completely rebuilt and re-modelled the house and included a private nonconformist chapel, stables, a gamekeeper‘s house, 200 acres of park and woodland, small lakes and a walled garden . The house was described as "a fine mansion with a spacious park", although the well known Norton sculptor Francis Chantrey described it as "Packing box with windows in". The Shores were forced to sell the house when their bank on Church Street failed in the financial crash of 1843. Initially there were no offers to buy, as Lord of the manor Offley Shore put the estate on the market. Finally a tenant, James Yates, was found and he lived in the house for a time.

The house was eventually purchased by Charles Cammell (1810–1879) in 1850, owner of the Cyclops Steel Works in Sheffield. Cammell added a grand dining room, a billiard room, orangery and colonnade. The next owner was John Sudbury who occupied the hall until 1901 and he was followed by William Frederic Goodliffe, a hosiery manufacturer, who lived there for a year with wife Elizabeth, daughters Ellen and Ada and four servants. In 1902 the owner was Lieutenant-Colonel Bernard Alexander Firth, Commander of the 4th Battalion of the York and Lancaster Regiment and the son of the Sheffield steel manufacturer Mark Firth. He had the dining room panelled in oak and installed a 17th-century marble fireplace, thereafter it was known as the Oak Room. In 1916 Bernard Firth allowed officers of the Royal Flying Corps to use the hall.

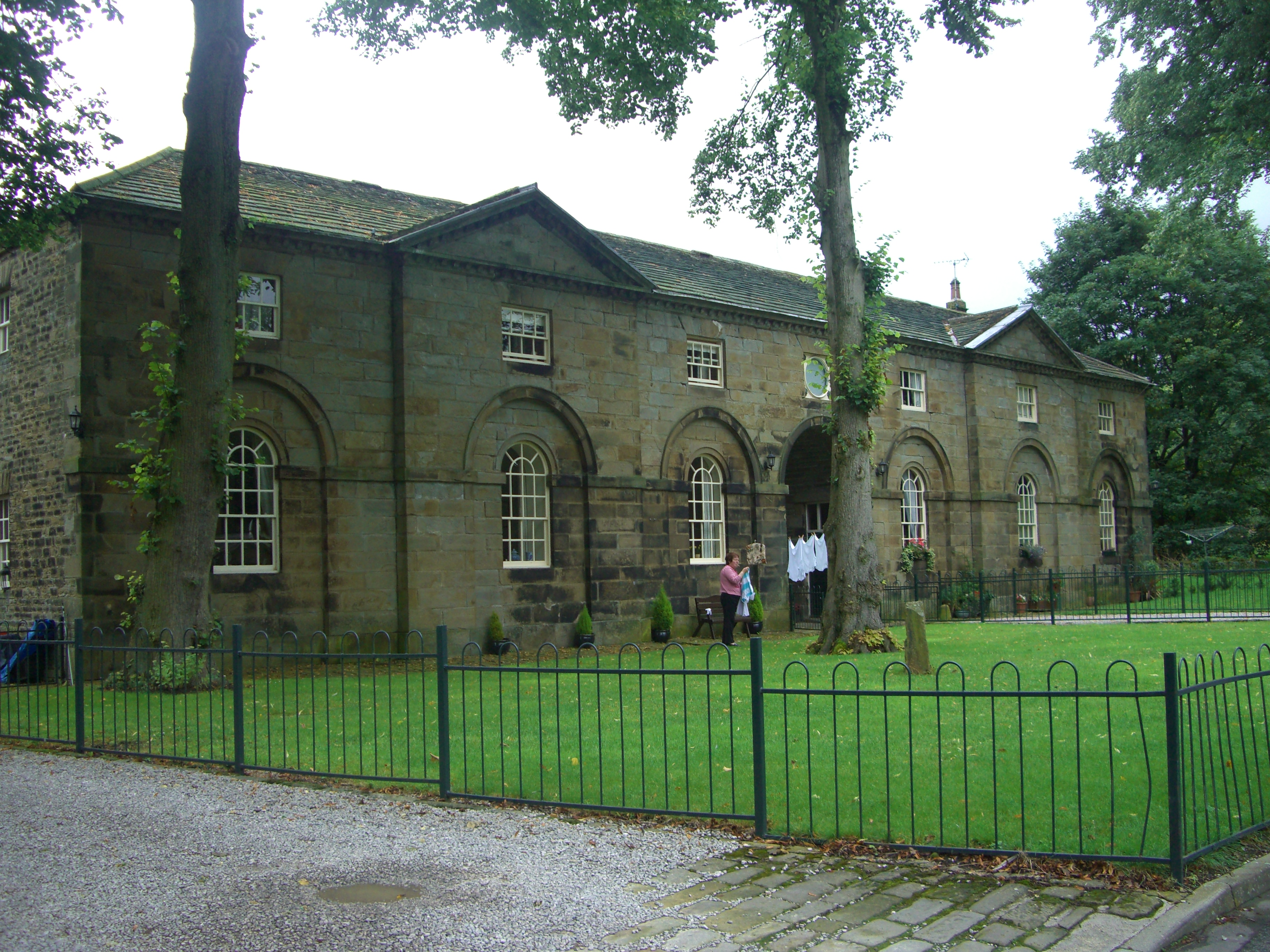
The stables

=== The hall as a hospital ===
In 1925 Lieutenant-Colonel Firth donated the hall to the four main voluntary hospitals in Sheffield, he also sold them 112 acres of land for £25,000. The plan was to incorporate Norton Hall into a new hospital which would amalgamate the services of The Royal, The Royal Infirmary and Jessop hospitals. However, a later decision was made to consolidate hospital services in the city centre and it was deemed that Norton was to far away to be used as a main hospital. This left Jessop Hospital to make full use of the site and in October 1927 the Firth Auxiliary Hospital (also known as the Norton Annexe) opened as a supplementary unit to the main site in the city centre. The unit could house 45 antenatal and fever cases and there was a special open air ward for the treatment of puerperal sepsis. The closure of the Firth Auxiliary Hospital was first discussed in April 1969 and it was finally closed in 1972. In November 1972 the hall was re-opened as the Beechwood private clinic which in turn closed in 1989.

=== The creation and development of Graves Park ===
When the Norton estate was broken up and sold in 1925 by Lieutenant-Colonel Firth, 154 acres were purchased by Councillor John George Graves and presented to Sheffield Corporation as a gift to the City of Sheffield for use as a public park, it was named Graves Park, the largest in the city. Over the years more of the Norton estate was bought up to increase the size of the park. In 1929, 43 acres of land previously occupied by tenant farmers was purchased and this was followed by the acquisition of another eight acres in 1931. In 1935 J.G. Graves again extended the park by buying land from the hospital trustees which had formerly been used by the Firth Auxiliary Hospital. In 1976, 22 acres of agricultural land which had previously been part of the Norton estate and stood close to the hall was acquired to create the Graves Park Animal Farm.

=== Present Day ===
In the 1990s the hall, stables, colonnade and orangery were developed into high class private accommodation.

== Architecture ==
The hall is constructed from dressed stone with a hipped slate roof. The main frontage of the building faces south and is composed of three storeys and a seven window range, the windows are mostly 20th century top hung casements with moulded surrounds and keystones. The front also has a central pediment and the main entrance has an open Doric three bay colonnade. The main colonnade leads off the west side of the building and is composed of eight bays with Doric columns. The colonnade leads on to the taller orangery which has three tall round arched openings with keystones, all the openings in the orangery and the colonnade have now been filled in as they have been converted to apartments. The stables stand 200 metres to the north east and are built of ashlars and coursed rubble with a hipped stone slate roof.
