= Neurocare =

British charity

Neurocare is a UK registered charitable organisation (1169762-14) which raises money for the neurosurgery department at Sheffield’s Royal Hallamshire Hospital.

== History ==
The charity, founded by neurospecialists Robert Battersby and Jan Mundy, started from a wish to help those most in need. Battersby and Mundy proposed that if they could raise just half of the money they needed for equipment; the hospital could cover the rest.

The charity has provided help to patients through local projects from the early 1980s up until 1997, when they established themselves as a charity.

Since 1997, Neurocare has raised significant funds to buy equipment that enhances the services the department provides. In the past it has funded equipment for patients with head injuries, brain tumours, strokes and cancers of the nervous system. It also buys specialist items for patients with neurological illnesses such as motor neurone disease, multiple sclerosis, epilepsy, and Parkinson's disease.

Neurocare is now part of Sheffield Hospitals Charity.

The Department of Neurosurgery at Sheffield Teaching Hospitals NHS Foundation Trust, which is based at the Royal Hallamshire Hospital, provides a regional neurosurgical service for a population of 2.2 million people covering South Yorkshire, North Derbyshire and North Lincolnshire. Some patients do travel from other parts of the UK for specialist treatment.
