= Children's Hospital (British TV series) =

British documentary television series

- Genre: Docu-soap
- Narrated by: Andrew Sachs
- Theme music composer: Debbie Wiseman
- Country of origin: United Kingdom
- Original language: English
- No. of series: 12
- No. of episodes: 114

Production
- Executive producer: Jeremy Mills
- Producers: Richard Bradley; Tracy Cook
- Running time: 30 minutes

Original release
- Network: BBC One
- Release: 19 October 1993 – 26 February 2003

Children's Hospital is a British television fly-on-the-wall documentary series based at the Sheffield Children's Hospital, Birmingham Children's Hospital, and Alder Hey Children's Hospital in Liverpool. It was broadcast on BBC One between 19 October 1993 and 26 February 2003.

== Production ==
According to scholar Annette Hill, the series had "all the hallmarks of a docu-soap", saying its "personal, melodramatic stories appeal to viewers, with more than 8 million tuning into the first series, despite widespread criticism from the press." Peter Lee-Wright observes that the series marked a transition in fly-on-the-wall documentaries by shifting the emphasis from the practical considerations onto the "human dramas being played out ... [capturing] the pain of the children ... and their parents' rollercoaster rides."

=== Music ===
The theme music was composed by Debbie Wiseman. The music was released as a CD single in 1997, containing full orchestral and piano versions of the theme, alongside the shorter versions used for the opening and closing sequences. The orchestral version was also released on the compilation album World of Sound. A new solo piano performance, titled "Ray of Sunshine", of the theme was included on the 2011 album Wiseman: Piano Stories.

== Transmissions ==
=== Series ===
Series	Start date	End date	Episodes
1	19 October 1993	21 December 1993	10
2	20 October 1994	22 December 1994	10
3	7 January 1997	3 June 1997	20
4	3 September 1997	10 October 1997	6
5	21 April 1998	17 June 1998	12
6	7 September 1998	9 November 1998	10
7	27 April 1999	8 July 1999	10
8	18 January 2000	29 February 2000	6
9	27 June 2000	1 August 2000	6
10	13 June 2001	15 August 2001	8
11	26 June 2002	7 August 2002	6
12	22 January 2003	26 February 2003	6

=== Specials ===
Entitle	Air Date
Christmas Special	22 December 1997
Philadelphia	8 December 1999
Russia with Jeremy Spake	10 December 1999
Christmas Special	20 December 1999
