= Sheffield Children's Hospital =

- Sheffield Children's NHS Foundation Trust
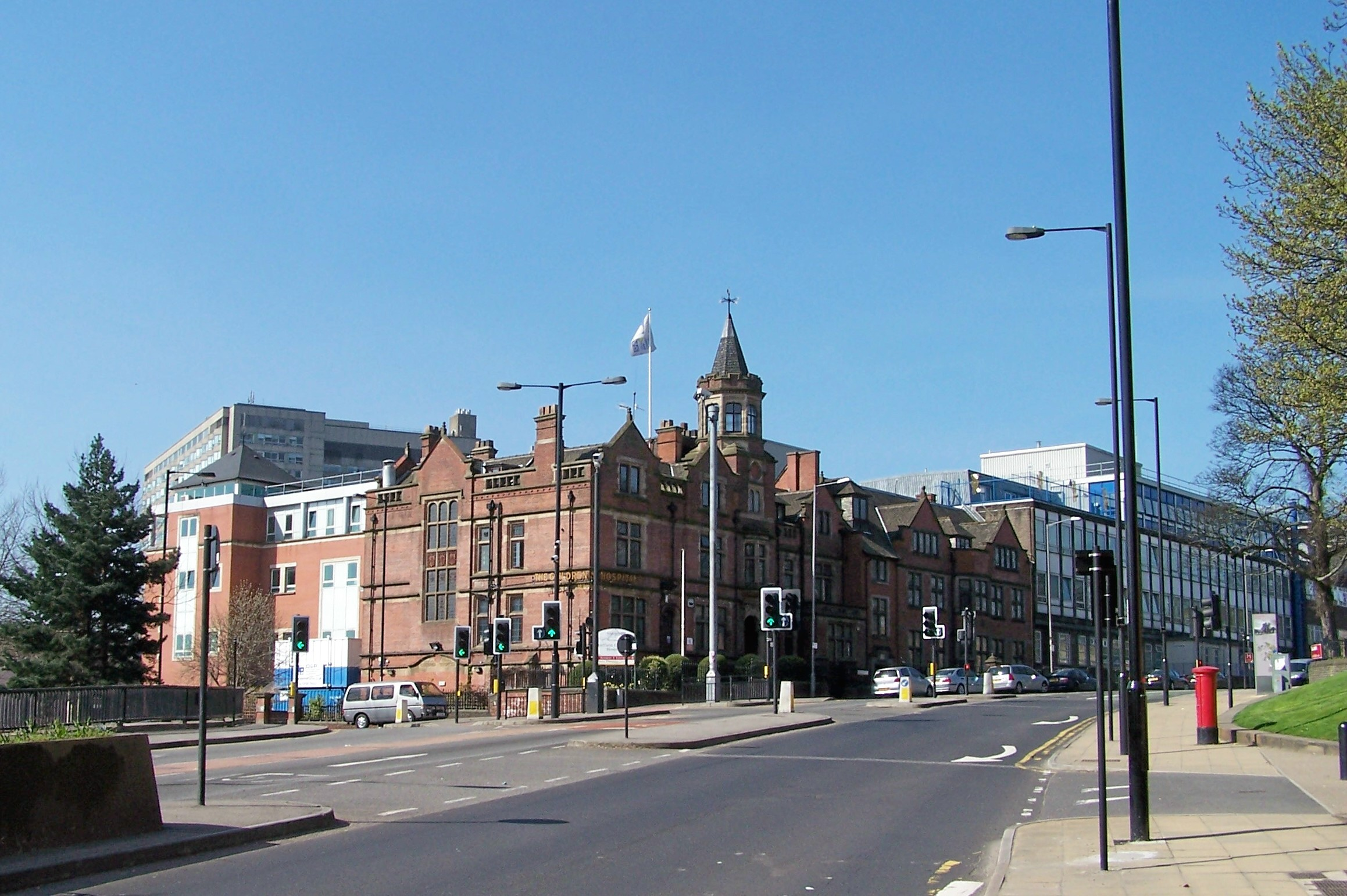
- A view of the hospital

- Shown in South Yorkshire

Geography
- Location: Western Bank, Broomhill, Sheffield, South Yorkshire, England
- Coordinates: 53.3807°N 1.49°W

Organisation
- Care system: NHS
- Type: Specialist, Children's hospital
- Affiliated university: Sheffield Medical School (University of Sheffield) & Faculty of Health and Wellbeing at Sheffield Hallam University

Services
- Emergency department: Paediatric Major Trauma Centre

Helipads
- Helipad: Yes

History
- Founded: 1876

Links
- Website: www.sheffieldchildrens.nhs.uk
- Lists: Hospitals in England

Public transit
- Tram: B Y University of Sheffield

The Sheffield Children's Hospital is a healthcare facility for children in Broomhill, Sheffield, South Yorkshire, England. It is managed by the Sheffield Children's NHS Foundation Trust.

== History ==
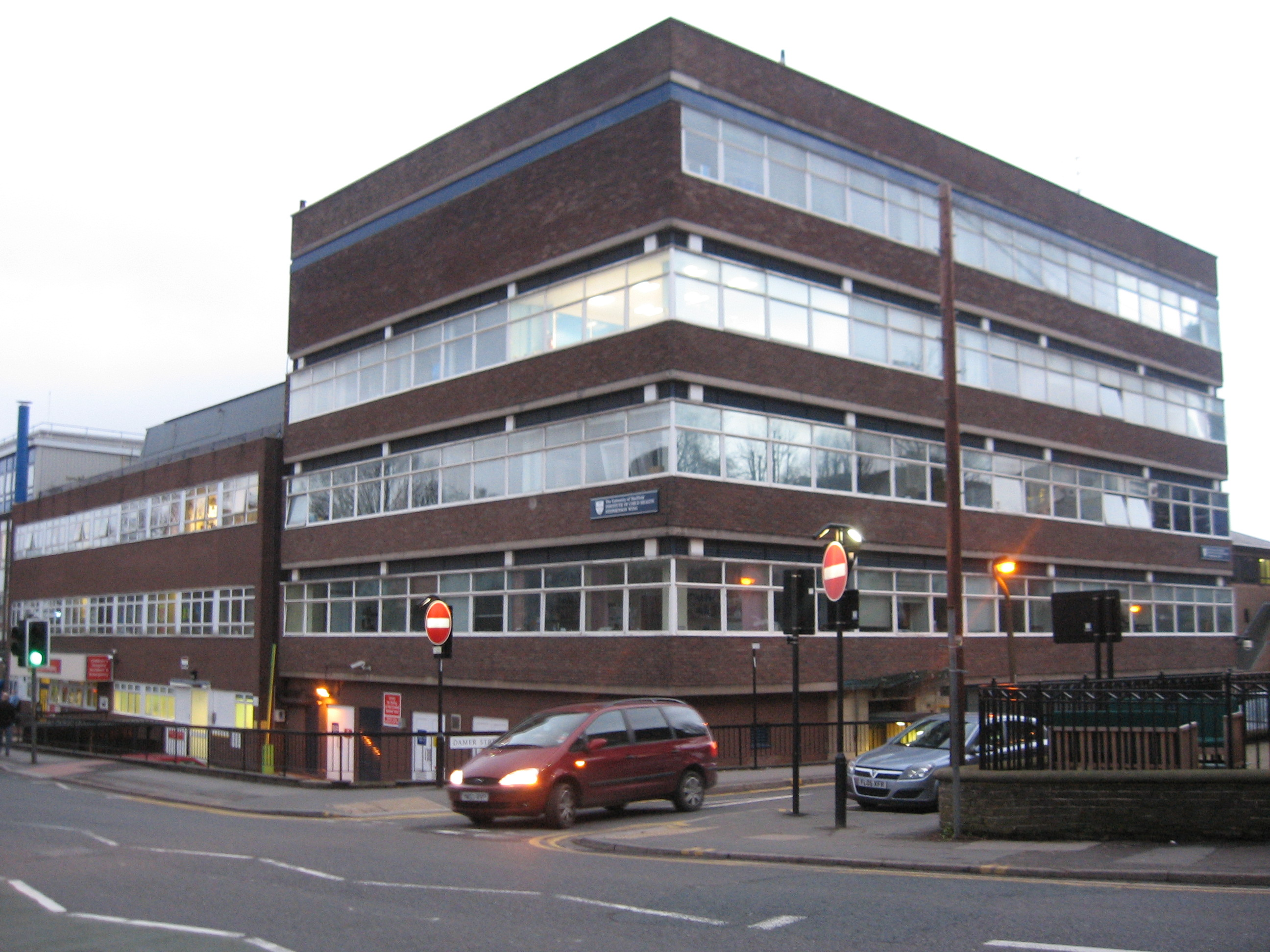
The Children's Hospital, Sheffield from the south west entrance of Weston Park, on Western Bank

The hospital first opened on 15 November 1876 as a children's infirmary in Brightmore House, on Brook Hill in Sheffield. Two years later it moved to its current site on Western Bank where it was accommodated in a pair of semi-detached houses. By the mid-1890s it was decided that the two old house were inadequate and should be pulled down and replaced. A new building on Brook Hill was opened in 1903, designed by the architect John Dodsley Webster. The first X-ray machine and electric lights arrived in 1907 and a new operating theatre and electric radiators were installed in the 1920s. Two new wards were completed in 1927, a baby ward was opened in the 1930s and a second operating theatre was built in the 1950s. The accident and emergency department was extended in the 1970s and services were transferred from the Northern General Hospital in the 1990s.

During the 1990s it was featured in the BBC Television series Children's Hospital.

Local football club Sheffield Wednesday donated their shirt sponsorship to Sheffield Children's Hospital and the associated Children's Hospital Charity for the 2009 – 10 and 2010–11 seasons.

A new wing, built at a cost of £40 million, was completed in 2018. The new wing provides a new hospital main entrance, outpatients consulting suites, specialist diagnostic and treatment areas, and three new wards. The new wing was officially opened by Prince Harry in July 2019.

== Research ==
The Sheffield Children's Clinical Research Facility (CCRF) opened in 2008 as the first dedicated CCRF in the UK. Research at Sheffield Children's NHS Foundation Trust spans a range of specialities including bone disease, genetics, respiratory disease, neurology, radiology, cancer and blood diseases, endocrinology and mental health. In 2012 the hospital received over £1 million in grants for research into the treatment of bronchiolitis, the use of vibration plate therapy to prevent fractures in children, and the development of bone scanning to replace X-rays in the study of bones in children.

== Public transport connections ==
The hospital is served by University of Sheffield tram stop which is situated a short walk away on the South Yorkshire Supertram network. The stop was opened in 1995 and is served by the Blue and Yellow routes. Local bus services stop on the main road, Western Bank, in front of the hospital. Additionally, a bus stop within the grounds of the adjacent Royal Hallamshire Hospital acts as the terminus of the H1 bus service which runs across the city to the Northern General Hospital, providing free transport for NHS staff between the hospitals of Sheffield.

== See also ==
- List of hospitals in England
