= Major trauma centre =

British specialist healthcare unit

Legend
: Hospitals Serving Both Adults and Children

: Hospitals Serving Adults Only

: Hospitals Serving Children Only

A major trauma centre (MTC) is a specialist unit within the National Health Service of the United Kingdom, set up to provide specialised trauma care and rehabilitation. They are usually found within larger hospitals in major cities which have the necessary infrastructure and staff to deal with major trauma cases.

MTCs provide emergency access to life and limb saving consultant-led care in a wide range of specialisms including anaesthetics, orthopaedics, neurosurgery, geriatrics, and emergency medicine. All MTCs have an on-site CT scanner and emergency operating theatres on standby to perform immediate, life-saving surgery. All MTCs also provide consultant-led rehabilitation care, to optimise recovery at the earliest opportunity.

Major trauma is described as a life-altering injury with risk of death or disability.

The first major trauma centre opened in England in 2012, with Scotland following in 2018, and in the same year plans were announced for the first MTC in Wales.

== England ==
There are 27 major trauma centres within NHS England, in three categories: adult and children; adult only; and children only. At first a small number of pilot sites were trialled. All major trauma centres in England operate within local trauma networks, ensuring patients are treated at the most appropriate place for their injuries, but returning to care closer to home when able.

The first MTCs opened in April 2012.

=== Major trauma centres in England ===
==== Adult and children ====
- Addenbrooke's Hospital (Cambridge)
- John Radcliffe Hospital (Oxford)
- King's College Hospital (London)
- Leeds General Infirmary
- Queen's Medical Centre (Nottingham)
- Royal London Hospital
- Royal Victoria Infirmary (Newcastle)
- Southampton General Hospital
- St George's Hospital (London)
- St Mary's Hospital (London)
- Southmead Hospital (Bristol)

==== Adult only ====
- Aintree University Hospital (Merseyside)
- Derriford Hospital (Plymouth)
- Hull Royal Infirmary
- James Cook University Hospital (Middlesbrough)
- Manchester Royal Infirmary
- Northern General Hospital (Sheffield)
- Queen Elizabeth Hospital Birmingham
- Royal Preston Hospital
- Royal Stoke University Hospital
- Royal Sussex County Hospital (Brighton)
- Salford Royal Hospital (Greater Manchester)
- University Hospital Coventry

==== Children only ====
- Alder Hey Children's Hospital (Liverpool)
- Birmingham Children's Hospital
- Bristol Royal Hospital for Children
- Royal Manchester Children's Hospital
- Sheffield Children's Hospital

== Scotland ==
The Scottish Trauma Network operates four major trauma centres within NHS Scotland. The first was designated at Aberdeen Royal Infirmary on 1 October 2018.

=== Major trauma centres in Scotland ===
==== Adult ====
- Aberdeen Royal Infirmary
- Ninewells Hospital (Dundee)
- Queen Elizabeth University Hospital (Glasgow)
- Royal Infirmary of Edinburgh

==== Children only ====
- Royal Aberdeen Children's Hospital
- Royal Hospital for Children (Glasgow)
- Royal Hospital for Children and Young People (Edinburgh)

== Wales ==
=== Major trauma centre of Wales ===
- University Hospital of Wales (Cardiff)

== Northern Ireland ==
=== Major trauma centre of Northern Ireland ===
- Royal Victoria Hospital (Belfast)
