= Jessop Hospital =

Hospital in South Yorkshire, England

Coordinates: 53.3816°N 1.4826°W

Jessop Hospital for Women
- Central Sheffield University Hospitals NHS Trust
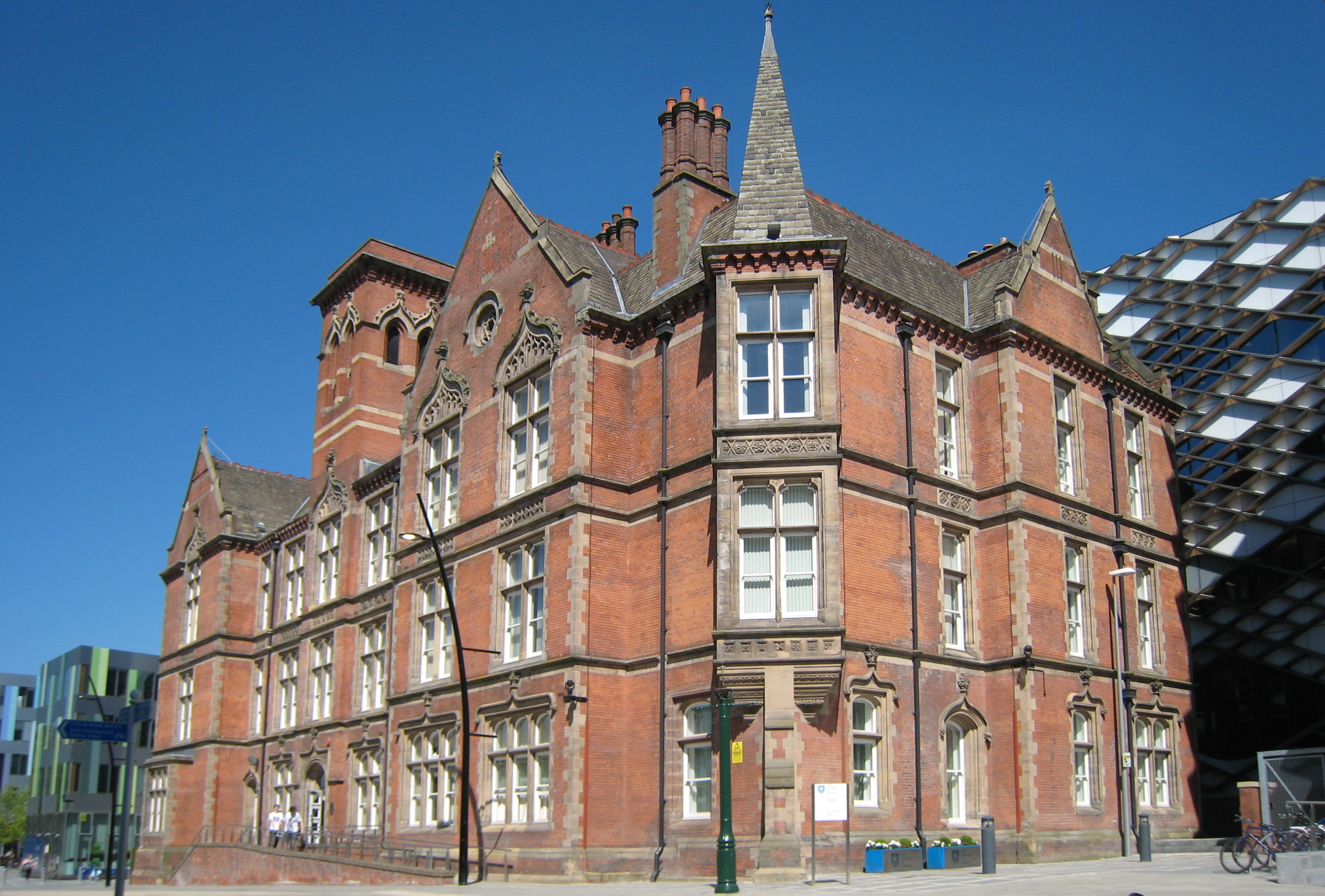
- The original Victorian wing of the Jessop Hospital

Geography
- Location: Sheffield, South Yorkshire, England

Organisation
- Care system: NHS
- Type: Maternity
- Affiliated university: Sheffield Medical School (University of Sheffield)

Services
- Emergency department: No
- Beds: 57 initially, 217 at closure

History
- Founded: 22 July 1878
- Closed: 2001

Links
- Lists: Hospitals in England
- Other links: List hospitals in England

The Jessop Hospital for Women was a hospital in Sheffield, South Yorkshire, England. At the time of its closure in 2001, it was managed by the Central Sheffield University Hospitals NHS Trust.

== History ==
=== Early history ===
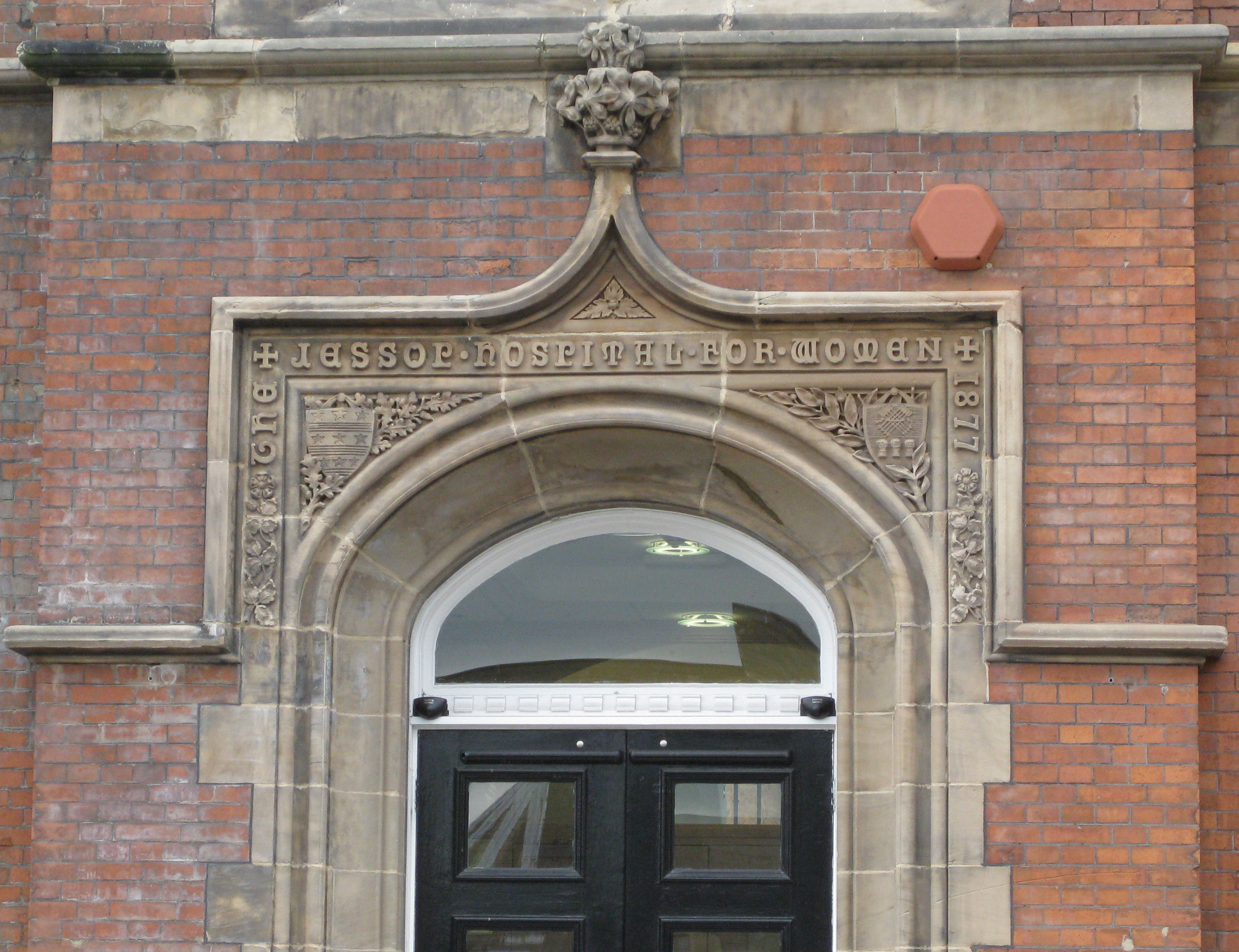
Main doorway to the original Victorian wing

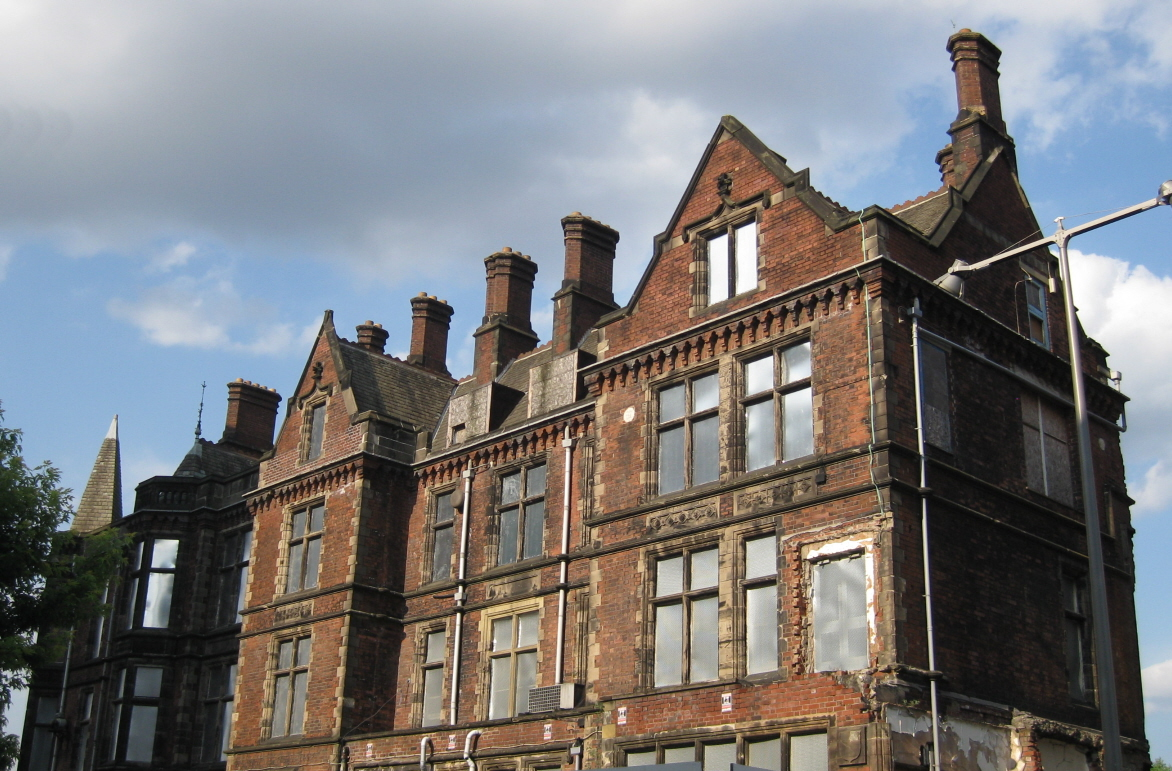
The Edwardian wing just before demolition in 2013

Following a large donation by Thomas Jessop, a wealthy steelworks owner, a new building was commissioned to replace the old Sheffield Hospital for Women at Figtree Lane, which had only six beds.

The new facility was designed by John Dodsley Webster in the Gothic Revival style. The building cost £26,000 – equivalent to approximately £2.1m in 2021 – all paid for by Jessop. It opened as the Jessop Hospital for Women in 1878. An extension, known as the Edwardian wing, was completed in 1902. Between 1927 and 1972 the hospital had a 45-bed annexe at Norton Hall known as the Firth Auxiliary Hospital.

Operation of the hospital was transferred from the Sheffield Health Authority (dissolved on 1 April 1992) to the Central Sheffield University Hospitals NHS Trust on 1 November 1991, who continued to operate the hospital until its closure.

The hospital was in the news in 1998 when Diane Blood gave birth to a baby boy, having been inseminated using her husband's sperm, which had been taken from his body while he was unconscious on life support, shortly before his death. A prolonged legal case gave her the right to do this, despite not having the written consent of her husband.

=== Closure and redevelopment ===
After services transferred to the Jessop Wing of the Royal Hallamshire Hospital, the hospital closed in 2001.

In 2007 the majority of the 1970s wing was demolished by the University of Sheffield as part of their Jessop West development. The Victorian Wing of the original hospital was converted to house the Department of Music, who occupied it in 2009.

Despite being a Grade II listed building, demolition of the Edwardian wing started on 30 July 2013. Demolition was pursued in favour of renovation as it provided the University of Sheffield with a greater floor area for new development at a lower cost. The demolition was opposed by the Victorian Society and the Hallamshire Historic Buildings Society (HHBS).

== See also ==
- List of hospitals in England
