= Weston Park Hospital =

- Sheffield Teaching Hospitals NHS Foundation Trust
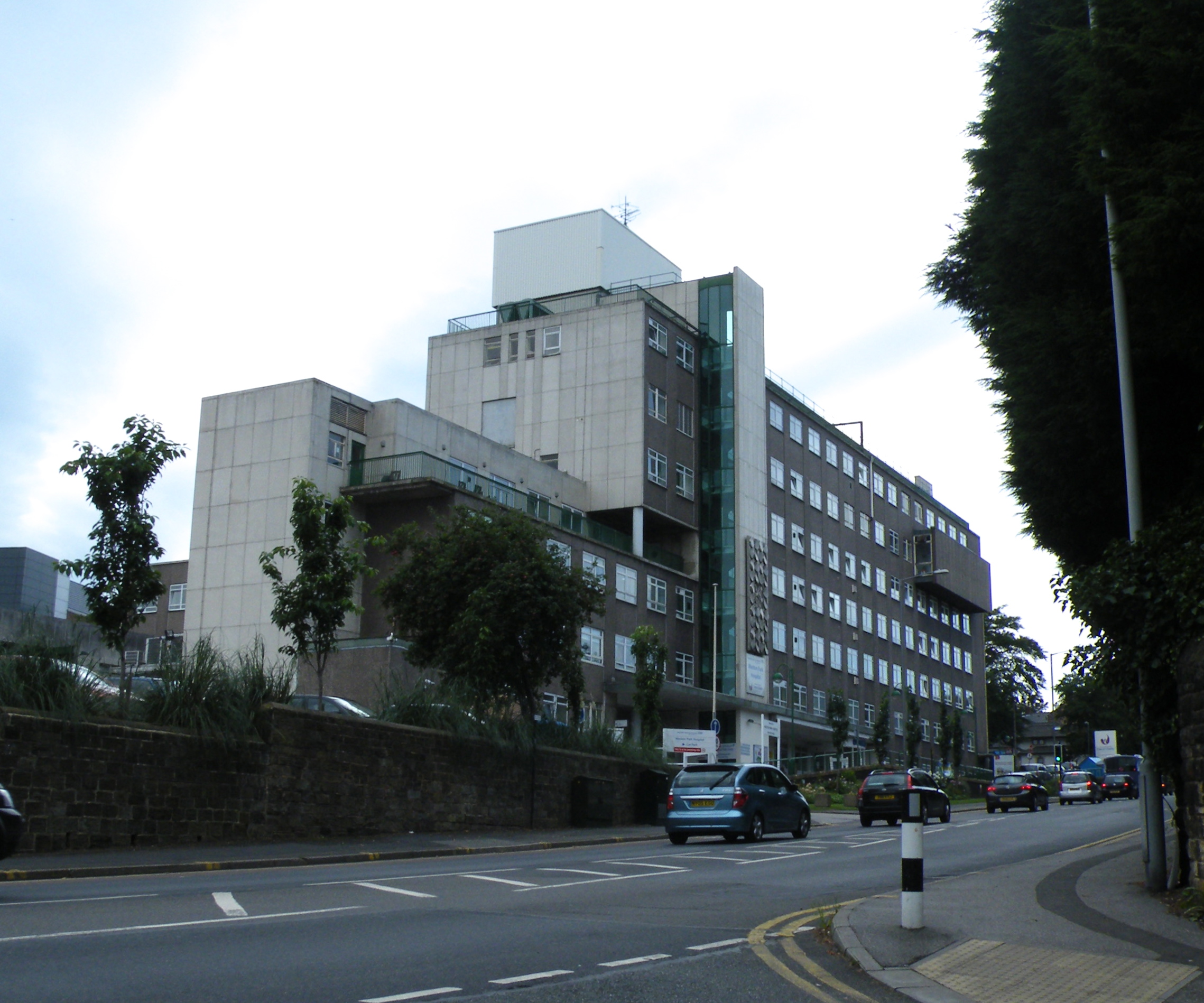
- Weston Park Hospital as viewed from Witham Road

- Shown in South Yorkshire

Geography
- Location: Broomhill, Sheffield, South Yorkshire, England
- Coordinates: 53.3808°N 1.4907°W

Organisation
- Care system: NHS
- Type: Cancer
- Affiliated university: Sheffield Medical School (University of Sheffield)

Services
- Emergency department: No

History
- Founded: 1950s

Links
- Website: www.westonparkcancercentre.nhs.uk
- Lists: Hospitals in England

Weston Park Hospital is a health facility specialising in the treatment of cancer in Broomhill, Sheffield, South Yorkshire, England. It is managed by the Sheffield Teaching Hospitals NHS Foundation Trust.

== History ==
The hospital has its origins in the Sheffield Radium Fund, which was established in 1914. The fund was used to create the Radium Centre in 1930 and subsequently the Sheffield National Centre for Radiotherapy in 1945. Weston Park Hospital was officially opened in April 1970.

Operation of the hospital was transferred from the Sheffield Health Authority (dissolved on 1 April 1992) to the newly created Weston Park Hospital NHS Trust on 1 November 1991. In April 1995, Weston Park was designated a cancer centre and the surrounding district hospitals became cancer units, based on recommendations from the Calman–Hine report, the purpose of which was to provide a uniformly high standard of care as close to the patient's home as possible.

On 1 April 1999, the Weston Park Hospital NHS Trust was merged into the existing Central Sheffield University Hospitals NHS Trust, which subsequently merged with the Northern General Hospital NHS Trust on 1 April 2001 to create the Sheffield Teaching Hospitals NHS Trust. The Trust was awarded Foundation status on 1 July 2004.

== Services ==
The hospital is one of four dedicated cancer centres in the United Kingdom. (Note: Other dedicated cancer centres include the Royal Marsden Hospital, the Christie Hospital and the Velindre Cancer Centre.)

== Public transport connections ==
The hospital is served by University of Sheffield tram stop which is situated a short walk away on the South Yorkshire Supertram network. The stop was opened in 1995 and is served by the Blue and Yellow routes. Local bus services stop on the main road, Whitham Road, in front of the hospital. Additionally, a bus stop within the grounds of the adjacent Royal Hallamshire Hospital acts as the terminus of the H1 bus service which runs across the city to the Northern General Hospital, providing free transport for NHS staff between the hospitals of Sheffield.

== See also ==
- Cancer in the United Kingdom
