= Lydia Manley Henry =

British medical doctor

- Born: 30 June 1891; Macduff, Scotland
- Died: 27 March 1985 (aged 93); Saint John, New Brunswick, Canada
- Education: University of Sheffield
- Occupation: physician
- Known for: Service in World War I and World War II
- Medical career
- Institutions: Sheffield Royal Infirmary; Sheffield Royal Hospital
- Awards: Croix de Guerre

Lydia Manley Henry DSc (30 June 1891 – 27 March 1985) was the first female graduate in medicine from the University of Sheffield. She served with the Scottish Women's Hospitals for Foreign Service during the First World War. She was awarded the Croix de Guerre by the French government. For her thesis on gangrene, based on her wartime experience, she was awarded the degree of MD, the first woman to graduate with this degree from the University of Sheffield.

== Early life and education ==
Lydia Henry was born in Macduff, Scotland. She was the daughter of William Paterson Henry (1853–1894) and his wife Elizabeth Dawson Murdoch (1856–1946). Her father died of tuberculosis when she was two years old. Her mother moved to Sheffield leaving her daughter to be brought up by an aunt in Macduff. At the age of 14, she relocated to Sheffield to join her mother, who had begun work at the Day Training College for Teachers in Sheffield and in 1905, became Vice-Principal of the City Training College. At this time, she felt able to care for her daughter again.

Henry was educated at the Sheffield High School for Girls. She enrolled in the Sheffield University Medical School in 1909. In June 1916, she graduated with an MB ChB, and along with fellow student, Florence Elizabeth Millard, they were the first women to receive a medical degree from the university. The next day she became the first woman to work as a hospital doctor in Sheffield.

== Medical career ==
Henry had further experience working as a house officer in Sheffield Royal Infirmary and the Sheffield Royal Hospital. During the World War I, it became easier for women doctors to find posts in teaching hospitals, as many male doctors were serving in the armed forces. Her experience included working in the Sheffield Royal Infirmary women's clinic for venereal diseases, the first woman doctor to do so.

The day after finishing as a house officer and becoming fully qualified to practise medicine, Henry enlisted in the Scottish Women's Hospitals for Foreign Service (SWH), working in the hospital set up in Royaumont Abbey, north-east of Paris. She arrived in July 1917 and was the youngest doctor on the staff. There, as an assistant surgeon, she had charge of the Blanche de Castille ward. She later served at the associated SWH hospital at Villers-Cotterêts, which treated French rather than British soldiers. After the war the French government awarded her the Croix de Guerre.

After the war, Henry worked on her MD thesis, which was on gangrene, based on her experiences with the condition at Royaumont. With this thesis, in 1920 she graduated from the University of Sheffield with the degree of MD, the first woman to do so. Appointment as assistant medical officer of health for Blackburn, Lancashire, followed. Her success in this post led to her appointment as head of the Social Services Department at the King's College for Women of the University of London, and she went on to become a member of its Senate.

Henry emigrated to Canada in 1925 and married, becoming Mrs J. Stewart Henry. She stopped practising as a physician. During World War II, she provided clothing for the minesweeper crews and Free French sailors operating out of north-east Scotland.

In 1978, the University of Sheffield medical school awarded her the degree of DSc, on the occasion of its 150th anniversary.

== Death and legacy ==
She died in Saint John, New Brunswick, Canada, on 27 March 1985. A memorial to her memory was erected in her birthplace, Macduff, Scotland.
