= Charles Clifford Dental Hospital =

Dental hospital in South Yorkshire, England

- Sheffield Teaching Hospitals NHS Foundation Trust
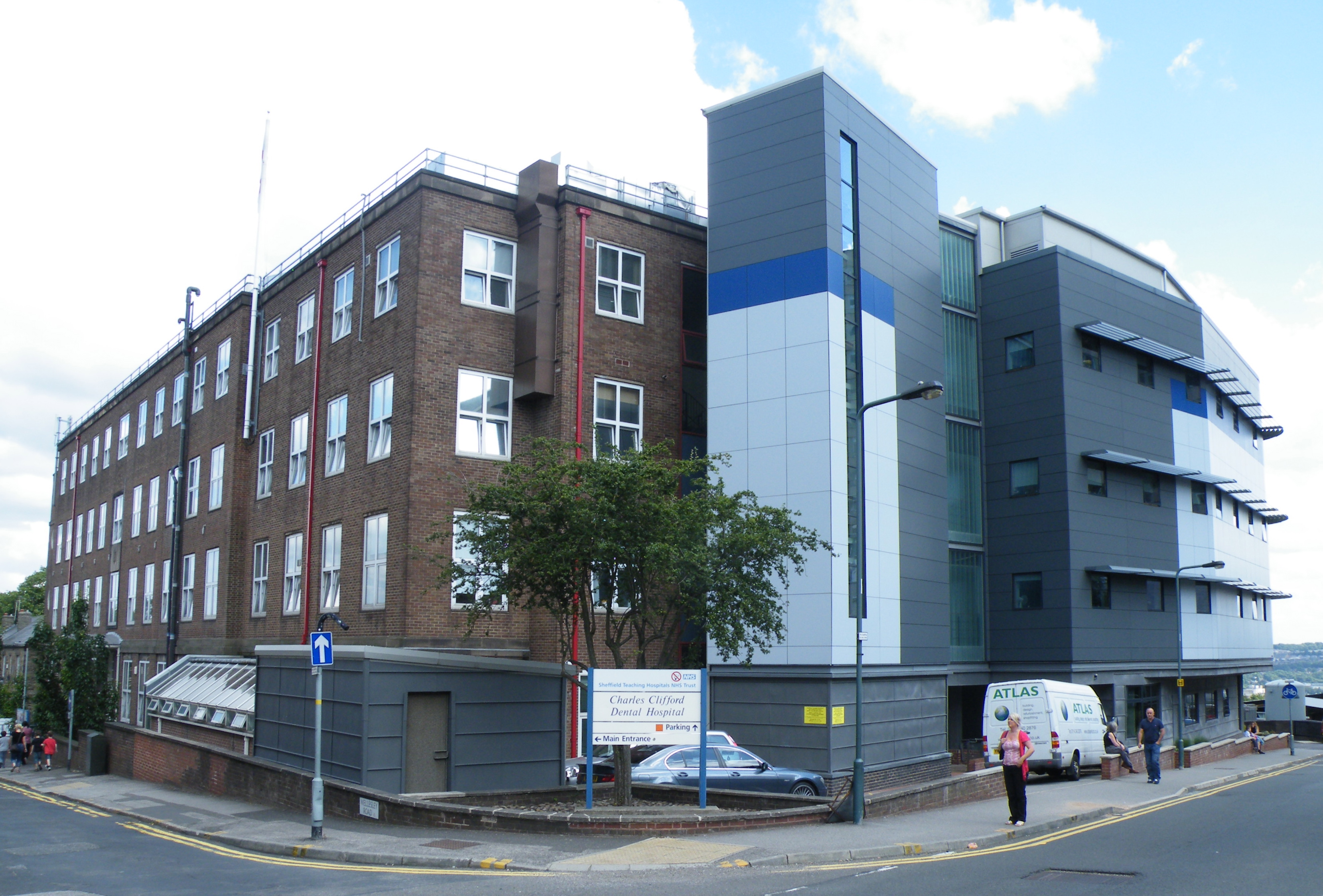
- Charles Clifford Dental Hospital

- Shown in South Yorkshire

Geography
- Location: Wellesley Road, Sheffield, South Yorkshire, England
- Coordinates: 53.3796°N 1.4937°W

Organisation
- Care system: NHS England
- Type: Teaching
- Affiliated university: University of Sheffield

Services
- Emergency department: No

History
- Founded: 1935

Links
- Website: www.sth.nhs.uk/our-hospitals/
- Lists: Hospitals in England

The Charles Clifford Dental Hospital is a major dental facility in Sheffield, South Yorkshire, England. It is managed by the Sheffield Teaching Hospitals NHS Foundation Trust and affiliated with the University of Sheffield.

== History ==
The hospital has its origins in the Dental Department of the Sheffield Royal Hospital which was established in 1897.

The facilities at the Dental Department became cramped and so Colonel Sir Charles Clifford, who had commanded 126 Brigade Royal Field Artillery, donated land for a new purpose-built facility and funding for dental equipment in 1935. The foundation stone was laid by Hilary Marquand, Minister of Health, in September 1951 and the facility was opened by the Duchess of Gloucester in 1953.

A large extension was added in 1966. In 1995, the hospital was absorbed into the Central Sheffield University Hospitals NHS Trust, which subsequently merged with the Northern General Hospital NHS Trust on 1 April 2001 to create the Sheffield Teaching Hospitals NHS Trust. The Trust was awarded Foundation status on 1 July 2004.

A major refurbishment programme of the hospital was completed in 2009. An inspection by the Care Quality Commission in December 2015 found that the overall performance was good with responsiveness rated as outstanding.
