= Barnsley Hospital NHS Foundation Trust =

Healthcare trust in England

- Type: NHS foundation trust
- Established: 1 January 2005
- Headquarters: Barnsley
- Chair: Trevor Lake
- Chief executive: Dr Richard Jenkins
- Website: www.barnsleyhospital.nhs.uk

Barnsley Hospital NHS Foundation Trust runs the 400 bed Barnsley Hospital in Barnsley, South Yorkshire, England. It became a Foundation Trust in January 2005.

In 2017 the trust established a subsidiary company, Barnsley Facilities Services, to which 140 estates and facilities staff were transferred. The intention was to achieve VAT benefits, as well as pay bill savings, by recruiting new staff on less expensive non-NHS contracts. VAT benefits arise because NHS trusts can only claim VAT back on a small subset of goods and services they buy. The Value Added Tax Act 1994 provides a mechanism through which NHS trusts can qualify for refunds on contracted-out services.

== Performance ==
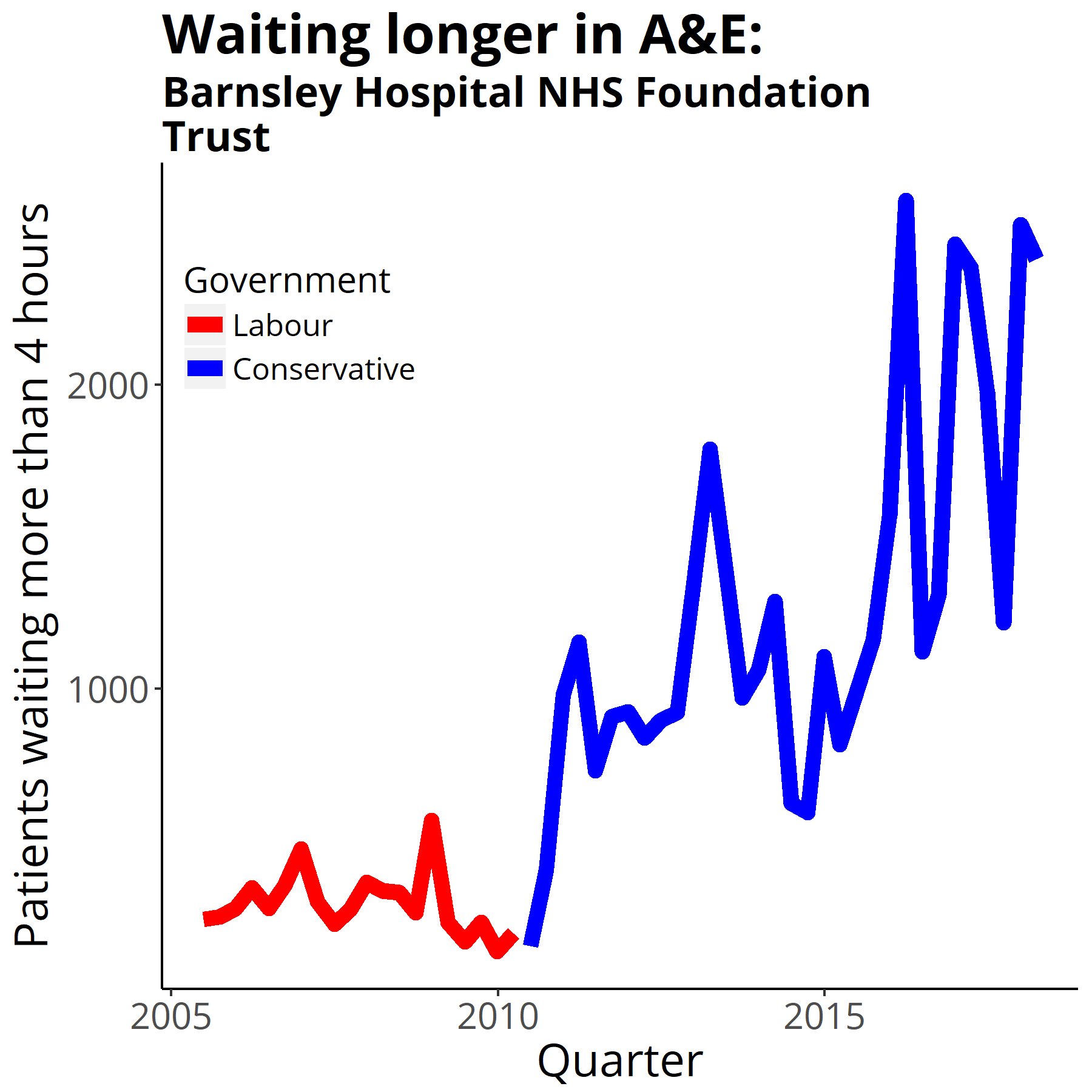
Four-hour target in the emergency department quarterly figures from NHS England Data from https://www.england.nhs.uk/statistics/statistical-work-areas/ae-waiting-times-and-activity/

In May 2014 it emerged that the Trust, after being investigated for "financial irregularities" was in the red to the tune of £7.4m after repeated failure to hit national accident-and-emergency targets which resulted in the trust spending 10% more than expected. Jane Ashby the finance director was sacked in December 2014 after it was discovered that one-off income had been misrepresented in the accounts and that predicted cost savings were over-stated at £6m when they amounted to only £2m. The trust expects to be in deficit of £12 million in April 2015. The trust has been threatened with "cessation of the supply of key drugs, doctors from the trust's preferred medical locum agency and catering" by suppliers because of its financial situation.

In 2014/5 the trust was given a loan of £18.5 million by the Department of Health which is supposed to be paid back in five years.

It was the first trust in England to adopt a new digital portal allowing patients to receive and respond to appointment letters digitally, in March 2017.

In October 2019 it was the only trust to hit both the 4 hour NHS targets.

G4S Integrated Services (G4S) was awarded a three-year contract in March 2014 to deliver healthcare cleaning services at the hospital.

It implemented a new e-prescribing system in May 2022. This van chart drugs, complete rounds and administer medications.

== See also ==
- List of NHS trusts
