= Barnsley Hospital =

Acute general hospital in Barnsley, South Yorkshire, England

- Barnsley Hospital NHS Foundation Trust
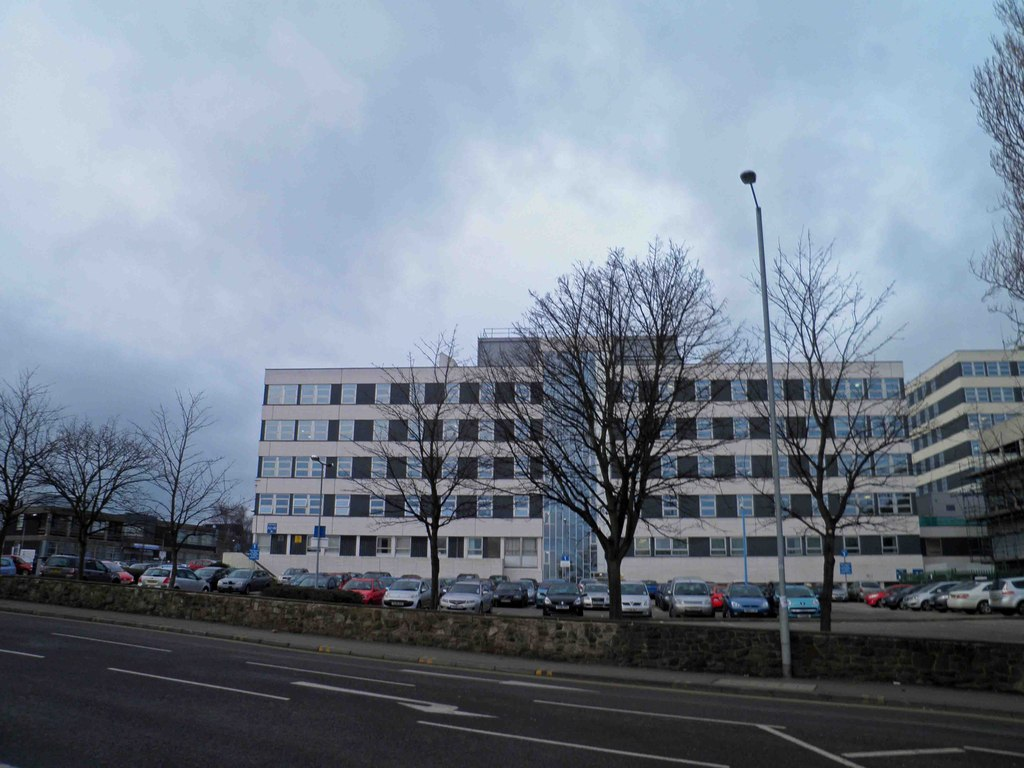
- Barnsley Hospital

- Shown in South Yorkshire

Geography
- Location: Barnsley, South Yorkshire, England
- Coordinates: 53.5579°N 1.4995°W

Organisation
- Care system: NHS
- Type: District General

Services
- Emergency department: Yes

History
- Founded: 1852

Links
- Website: www.barnsleyhospital.nhs.uk
- Lists: Hospitals in England

Barnsley Hospital is an acute general hospital in Barnsley, South Yorkshire, England. It is managed by the Barnsley Hospital NHS Foundation Trust.

== History ==
The hospital has its origins in the Barnsley Union Workhouse Infirmary which opened in 1852. It was expanded in 1875 and a new purpose-built infirmary, designed with a pavilion layout, was completed in 1883. It became Barnsley Municipal Hospital in 1930 but was renamed St Helen Hospital in 1935, before joining the National Health Service in 1948.

A major redevelopment of the site to create Barnsley District General Hospital was completed in 1977. The facility became known as Barnsley Hospital in 2005.

In 2021 an extension to the emergency department was opened which brings together the hospital’s previous paediatric units into a single location.

== Arms ==
Coat of arms of Barnsley Hospital

Notes
Granted 27 February 1950
Crest
On a wreath of the colours issuant from a cup Sable a rose Argent barbed and seeded stalked and leaved Proper.
Escutcheon
Per chevron Sable and Argent in chief two covered cups of the second and in base a cross formy of the first.
Motto
Salus Infirmorum
