= Northern General Hospital =

- Sheffield Teaching Hospitals NHS Foundation Trust
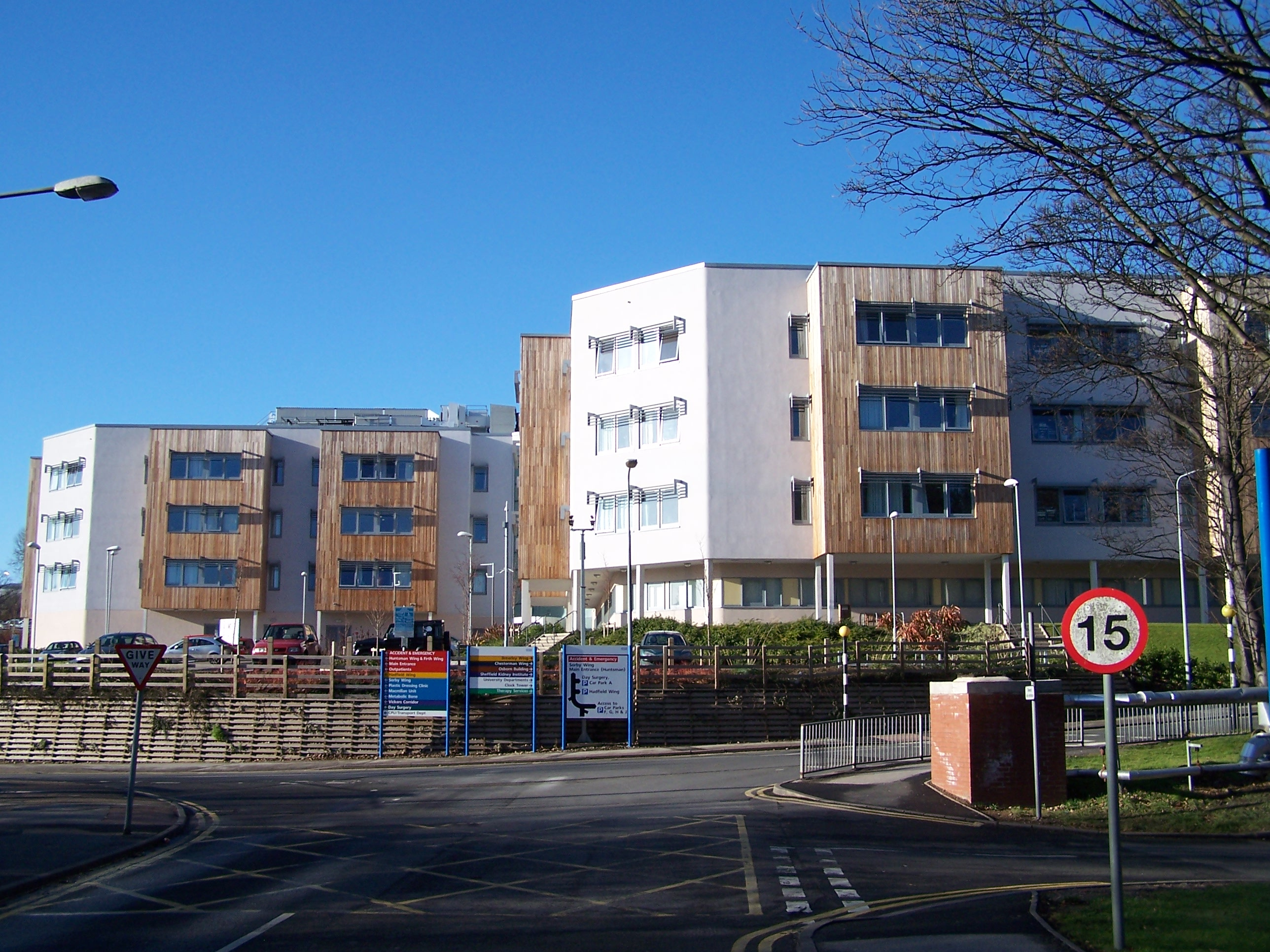
- Hadfield Wing

- Shown in South Yorkshire

Geography
- Location: Herries Road, Fir Vale, Sheffield, South Yorkshire, England
- Coordinates: 53°24′39″N 1°27′30″W

Organisation
- Care system: NHS England
- Type: Teaching
- Affiliated university: University of Sheffield; Sheffield Hallam University

Services
- Emergency department: Yes – Major Trauma Centre
- Beds: 1,100

Helipads
- Helipad: Yes

History
- Founded: 1878 (as Fir Vale Workhouse)

Links
- Website: www.sth.nhs.uk/our-hospitals/northern-general-hospital
- Lists: Hospitals in England

The Northern General Hospital is a large teaching hospital and Major Trauma Centre in Sheffield, England. Its departments include accident and emergency for adults, with children being treated at the Sheffield Children's Hospital on Western Bank. The hospital is managed by the Sheffield Teaching Hospitals NHS Foundation Trust.

== History ==
The hospital has its origins in the Fir Vale workhouse and infirmary for which the foundation stone was laid in 1878. When it opened in September 1881, the infirmary block had capacity for 366 patients. A ward for treating women with venereal diseases was established in the 1890s. The infirmary block was re-built and became the Sheffield Union Hospital when the workhouse was renamed the Fir Vale Institution in 1906. The Sheffield Union Hospital became the Fir Vale Hospital, and the Fir Vale Institution became Fir Vale House a few years later.

In 1930, the names changed again and the Fir Vale Hospital became the City General Hospital and Fir Vale House became the Fir Vale Infirmary. The City General Hospital performed the world's first heart valve replacement operation in 1955 before it merged with the Fir Vale Infirmary to form the Northern General Hospital in 1967. The hospital was the main receiving station for the victims of the Hillsborough disaster in 1989.

On 1 November 1991, operation of Northern General Hospital was transferred from the Sheffield Health Authority (dissolved on 1 April 1992) to the newly created Northern General Hospital NHS Trust. Lodge Moor Hospital was closed in 1994, with the treatment of chest and spinal injuries transferring to the Northern General Hospital. On 1 April 2001, the Northern General Hospital NHS Trust merged with the Central Sheffield University Hospitals NHS Trust (based at the Royal Hallamshire Hospital) to form the Sheffield Teaching Hospitals NHS Trust, which was later awarded Foundation status on 1 July 2004.

In 2012, the Northern General became a major trauma centre providing emergency access to life and limb saving consultant-led care in a wide range of specialisms including anaesthetics, orthopaedics, neurosurgery, geriatrics, and emergency medicine. It benefited from emergency operating theatres on standby to perform immediate, life-saving surgery as well as a helipad for rapid transport.

A post-operative surgical unit costing £21.3 million was opened in summer 2008. In June 2016, a new £2 million helipad opened at the hospital. It was funded by the Sheffield Hospitals Charity and is located close to the accident and emergency department.

== Services ==
The hospital consists of a series of buildings and wings, many of which are named after significant families and individuals from Sheffield, particularly in the steel industry:

- The Huntsman Building: named for Benjamin Huntsman, a manufacturer of cast or crucible steel, it is mostly orthopaedics but also contains the A&E, Surgical Assessment Centre (SAC), X-ray departments, the theatres, one of four outpatients' departments, a large dining room and the site's main Medical Records department.
- The Firth Wing: named for Mark Firth, an industrialist, it contains CCU, Vascular surgery and other surgical wards.
- The Chesterman Wing: named for James Chesterman, a manufacturer of steel products, it contains the regional cardiology centre as well as extensive inpatient and outpatient facilities.
- The Vickers Corridor: named for Edward Vickers, an industrialist, it deals primarily with renal and endocrine diseases but also contains departments of Sheffield Medical School and the Sheffield Kidney Institute.
- The Sorby Wing: named for Henry Clifton Sorby, a microscopist and geologist, it contains the renal outpatients unit and the Metabolic Bone Centre.
- The Osborn Building: named for Sir Samuel Osborn, a steelmaker, it contains the spinal unit.
- The Brearley Wing: named for Harry Brearley, a metallurgist, it contains the respiratory and rehabilitation wards and a dining area as well as an outpatient department and a specialised Patient Discharge Lounge which allows patients to move into a comfortable waiting area before leaving the hospital.
- The Bev Stokes Day-surgery Unit: named for Harold Beverley Stokes, a former chairman of the Northern General Hospital Trust, this is the day surgeries area.
- The Hadfield Wing: named for Sir Robert Hadfield, another metallurgist, this contains departments displaced from older wings of the hospital as well as the neck of femur ward.

The critical care department contains the intensive care unit, the high-dependency unit and the post-operative surgical unit while the Clock Tower Building contains the finance department, dining facilities, the volunteers' office, medical secretaries, security, human resources and the hospital's museum. An out of hours GP centre for patients with minor illnesses alleviates pressure on the accident and emergency department.

== Transport ==
The hospital is served directly by First South Yorkshire and Stagecoach Yorkshire buses mainly.
