= Sheffield Teaching Hospitals NHS Foundation Trust =

Healthcare trust in England

- Former name: Sheffield Teaching Hospitals NHS Trust (2001–2004)
- Type: NHS Foundation Trust
- Established: 1 April 2001
- Region served: South Yorkshire
- Budget: £1.2 billion (2019–2020)
- Hospitals: Northern General Hospital; Royal Hallamshire Hospital; Charles Clifford Dental Hospital; Weston Park Hospital
- Chair: Mahmud Nawaz
- Chief executive: Kirsten Major
- Website: www.sth.nhs.uk

The Sheffield Teaching Hospitals NHS Foundation Trust is a combined acute and community NHS foundation trust in Sheffield, England. Founded in 2001 and awarded foundation status in 2004, the trust covers most of Sheffield's adult community services, two major adult hospitals, the Northern General Hospital and the Royal Hallamshire Hospital, as well as the specialised Charles Clifford Dental, Jessop Wing and Weston Park hospitals. The chief executive of the trust is Kirsten Major, the chief nurse is Chris Morley, the medical director for operations is Jennifer Hill, and the medical director for strategy and development is David Black.

== History ==
The origins of the Sheffield Teaching Hospitals NHS Foundation Trust can be traced back to the legislation under Section 5 of the National Health Service and Community Care Act 1990, enacted by statutory order in October 1991, which transferred control of medical care in the Sheffield area over from the Sheffield Health Authority to four separate NHS trusts with effect from 1 November 1991: the Central Sheffield University Hospitals NHS Trust (covering the Royal Hallamshire Hospital, the Jessop Hospital, Lodge Moor Hospital and Nether Edge Hospital); the Northern General Hospital NHS Trust; the Sheffield Children's NHS Trust; and the Weston Park Hospital NHS Trust. The trusts came into full operation on 1 April 1992, at which point the Sheffield Health Authority was dissolved.

Lodge Moor Hospital closed in 1994, with its infectious diseases isolation section moving to the Royal Hallamshire Hospital and treatment of chest and spinal injuries transferring to the Northern General Hospital. That same year, the operation of Nether Edge Hospital was transferred to the newly created Community Health Sheffield NHS Trust. Charles Clifford Dental Hospital was integrated within the Central Sheffield University Hospitals NHS Trust in 1995. On 1 April 1999, the Weston Park Hospital NHS Trust was merged into the Central Sheffield Universities NHS Trust, creating a major teaching hospital at the same time. In 2001, the Jessop Hospital for Women was closed and operations were transferred to the new Jessop Wing hospital adjacent to the Royal Hallamshire Hospital.

The Central Sheffield University Hospitals NHS Trust and the Northern General Hospital NHS Trust were merged on 1 April 2001 to create the Sheffield Teaching Hospitals NHS Trust, covering almost all major medical facilities (apart from paediatrics) in the city under a single trust. On 1 July 2004, the new trust was granted Foundation status, becoming the Sheffield Teaching Hospitals NHS Foundation Trust.

== Facilities ==
The trust provides a full range of local hospital and community health services for people in Sheffield and is one of the biggest provider of specialised services in England. The trust is recognised internationally for its work in neurosciences, spinal injuries, renal, cancer, transplantation and orthopaedics.

The trust manages five hospitals and community health services: Northern General Hospital, Royal Hallamshire Hospital, Jessop Wing, Charles Clifford Dental Hospital, Weston Park Cancer Centre The 170-bed Sir Robert Hadfield wing at the trust's Northern General Hospital, opened in 2007, was closed after fire safety defects were discovered in December 2018 and South Yorkshire Fire and Rescue issued the trust a "prohibition notice". It was reopened in 2021. The trust sued the developers, Hadfield Healthcare Partnerships and Kajima Construction Europe, in 2022, claiming £15 million compensation. Hadfield Healthcare Partnerships is the private finance initiative provider responsible for operating the building. They have also brought a claim against Veolia, which was the facilities management contractor.

Sheffield Children's NHS Foundation Trust is a separate organisation.

The trust provides care for over 2 million patients annually, it also provides clinical education for students of healthcare professions from the University of Sheffield and Sheffield Hallam University. The trust uses the Lorenzo patient record systems but will changeover to Oracle Cerner in 2024.

== Performance ==
The trust employs 18,000 staff and had a budget of £1.2 billion in 2019/2020. It has been rated as Good overall by the Care Quality Commission and is one of only a small number to have achieved a Good rating in every one of the five domains which the Care Quality Commission use to rate a NHS organisation – Well Led, Caring. Responsive, Safe and Effective.

The trust is lead provider for the South Yorkshire and Bassetlaw NHS vaccination programme.

== See also ==
- List of hospitals in England
- List of NHS trusts
