= Sheffield Children's NHS Foundation Trust =

NHS children's trust

- Type: NHS trust
- Established: 1 November 1991
- Headquarters: Western Bank; Sheffield; S10 2TH
- Hospitals: Sheffield Children's Hospital
- Staff: 2,828
- Website: www.sheffieldchildrens.nhs.uk

Sheffield Children's Trust is an NHS hospital trust mainly providing healthcare for children in Sheffield and the surrounding area of South Yorkshire. A third of patients come from the outside Sheffield, from all parts of the country, but especially from Barnsley, Rotherham, Doncaster, Derbyshire Nottinghamshire and Lincolnshire.

It has a turnover of £300 million a year, and over a year sees 140,000 Outpatients, 20,000 Inpatients/day cases, 43,426 Accident & Emergency attendances, 12,670 Mental Health assessments and attendances and 28,874 Therapy assessments and attendances. The Trust employs around 4,000 people and also provides clinical education for medical students from the University of Sheffield and for nurses from Sheffield Hallam University.

Although the trust itself was only formed on 1 November 1991 when operation was transferred from the now-dissolved Sheffield Health Authority, it runs the Sheffield Children's Hospital which has been providing care for the children and families of Sheffield and surrounding areas for over 125 years. It is one of only four specialist NHS Trusts in England providing care exclusively to children and young people, and has many other sites in the city. The Trust's charity, Sheffield Children's Hospital Charity, helps to raise funds to support and enhance the services at the Trust. The charity's patrons include Dominic Calvert-Lewin, Jessica Ennis-Hill and England Cricketer Joe Root. Previous patrons include Michael Palin, Lee Westwood and Michael Vaughan.

== Performance ==
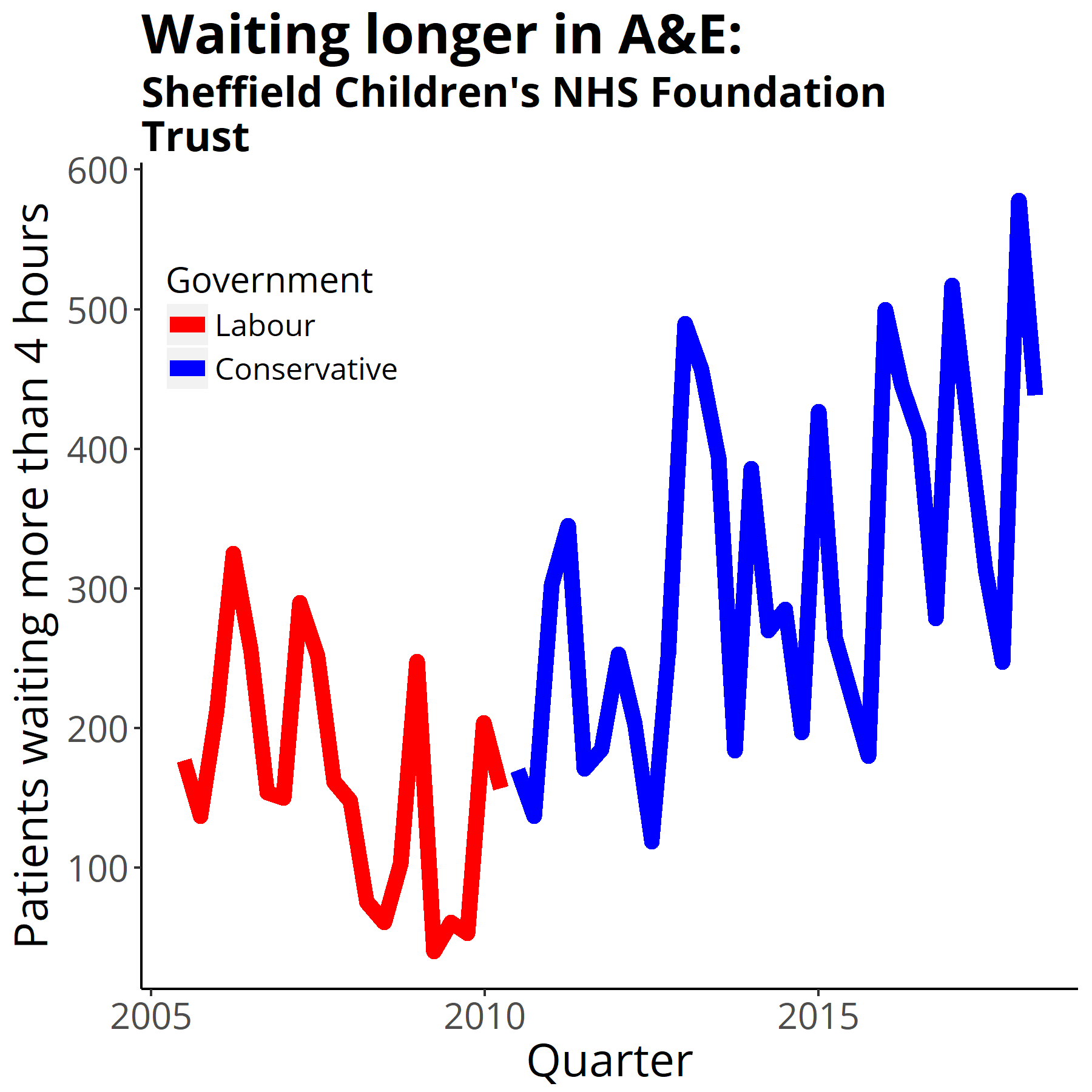
Four-hour target in the emergency department quarterly figures from NHS England Data from https://www.england.nhs.uk/statistics/statistical-work-areas/ae-waiting-times-and-activity/

In 2014 the trust was the joint best in England on the target of seeing 95% of people who attend accident and emergency departments within four hours. It achieved 97.9%. The trust put on extra consultant ward rounds at the weekend and employed extra nursing staff. A short stay unit was opened for children who needed observation for more than four hours. Senior consultants were in the emergency department from 8am to midnight.

It was named by the Health Service Journal as one of the top hundred NHS trusts to work for in 2015. At that time it had 2456 full-time equivalent staff and a sickness absence rate of 4.5%. 84% of staff recommend it as a place for treatment and 68% recommended it as a place to work.

== Facilities ==
The trust installed a new 3T MRI machine in 2016. It is much quieter than earlier designs and can be used while an operation is in process. It was financed by the Children's Hospital Charity.

== See also ==
- List of NHS trusts
