= Royal Hallamshire Hospital =

- Sheffield Teaching Hospitals NHS Foundation Trust
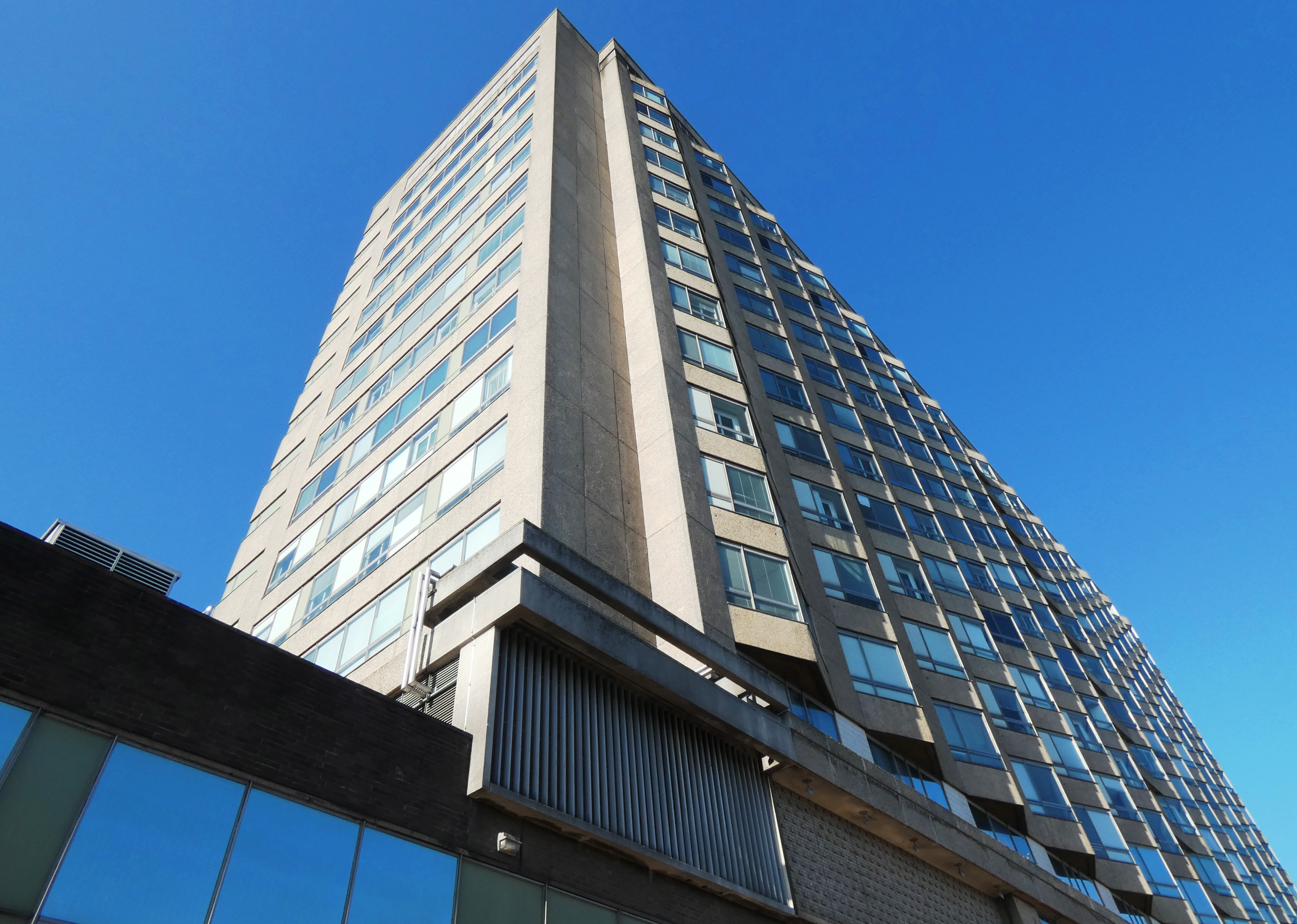
- A view of the hospital

- Shown in South Yorkshire

Geography
- Location: Glossop Road, Broomhill, Sheffield, South Yorkshire, England
- Coordinates: 53.378493°N 1.493196°W

Organisation
- Care system: NHS England
- Type: Teaching
- Affiliated university: Sheffield Medical School; Sheffield Hallam University

Services
- Emergency department: No
- Beds: 850

History
- Founded: 1971

Links
- Website: www.sth.nhs.uk/our-hospitals/royal-hallamshire-hospital
- Lists: Hospitals in England

The Royal Hallamshire Hospital is a general and teaching hospital located in Sheffield, South Yorkshire, England. It is in the city's West End, facing Glossop Road and close to the main campus of University of Sheffield and the Collegiate Crescent campus of Sheffield Hallam University. The hospital is run by the Sheffield Teaching Hospitals NHS Foundation Trust.

== History ==
The hospital, which replaced both the Sheffield Royal Hospital and the Sheffield Royal Infirmary, was designed by Adams, Holden and Pearson and built in two phases; the first phase, a three-storey out-patients department was completed in 1971. The second phase, the main building, was opened by the Prince of Wales in 1978. The main building was designed as three main interlinked buildings, the most significant being the monolithic 21-storey concrete structure, which remains the third highest in Sheffield after St Paul's Tower and the Arts Tower. It was designed with the rear part of the building overhanging a service road.

Operation of the hospital was transferred from the Sheffield Health Authority (dissolved on 1 April 1992) to the newly created Central Sheffield University Hospitals NHS Trust on 1 November 1991. On 1 April 2001, the Central Sheffield University Hospitals NHS Trust merged with the Northern General Hospital NHS Trust to create the Sheffield Teaching Hospitals NHS Trust, which was later awarded Foundation status on 1 July 2004.

The Jessop Wing, which replaced the Jessop Hospital for Women as a provider of maternity and gynecology services, was designed by the George Trew Dunn Partnership and opened by the Earl of Scarbrough, Lord Lieutenant of South Yorkshire in 2001.

== Services ==
Most non-emergency departments are represented in the hospital, although accident and emergency cases are handled by the Northern General Hospital, on the north side of the city. It has 14 operating theatres and it provides training for both Sheffield Hallam University and the University of Sheffield. It contains one of the United Kingdom's largest departments of infectious diseases and tropical medicine, which includes one of the country's HCID (High Consequence Infectious Diseases) units for looking after ebola cases and other very serious infectious illnesses.

== Public transport connections ==
The hospital is served by University of Sheffield tram stop which is situated a short walk away on the South Yorkshire Supertram network. The stop was opened in 1995 and is served by the Blue and Yellow routes. There is a dedicated bus stop situated on a turning circle within the hospital grounds which is primarily used as the terminus of the H1 bus service between the Royal Hallamshire Hospital and the Northern General Hospital; operated by Sheffield Community Transport under contract from the NHS, this service runs every 30 minutes during the daytime and is free to use for NHS staff, with a flat fare charged to other passengers. Other local bus services stop on the main roads on either side of the hospital – either Glossop Road to the south, or Western Bank to the north.

== See also ==
- List of hospitals in England
- Neurocare charity
