= Sheffield Royal Hospital =

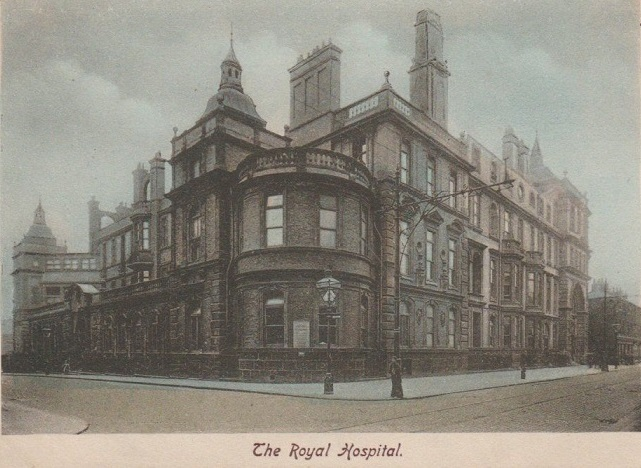
- Sheffield Royal Hospital

- Shown in South Yorkshire

Geography
- Location: Sheffield, South Yorkshire, England
- Coordinates: 53.38000°N 1.47735°W

Organisation
- Care system: Public
- Type: General
- Affiliated university: None

Services
- Emergency department: No

History
- Founded: 1832
- Closed: 1978

Links
- Lists: Hospitals in England

The Royal Hospital was an acute general hospital in Sheffield, South Yorkshire. It covered most of the block bounded to the north by West Street, to the east by Westfield Terrace, to the south by Devonshire Street and to the west by Eldon Street.

== History ==
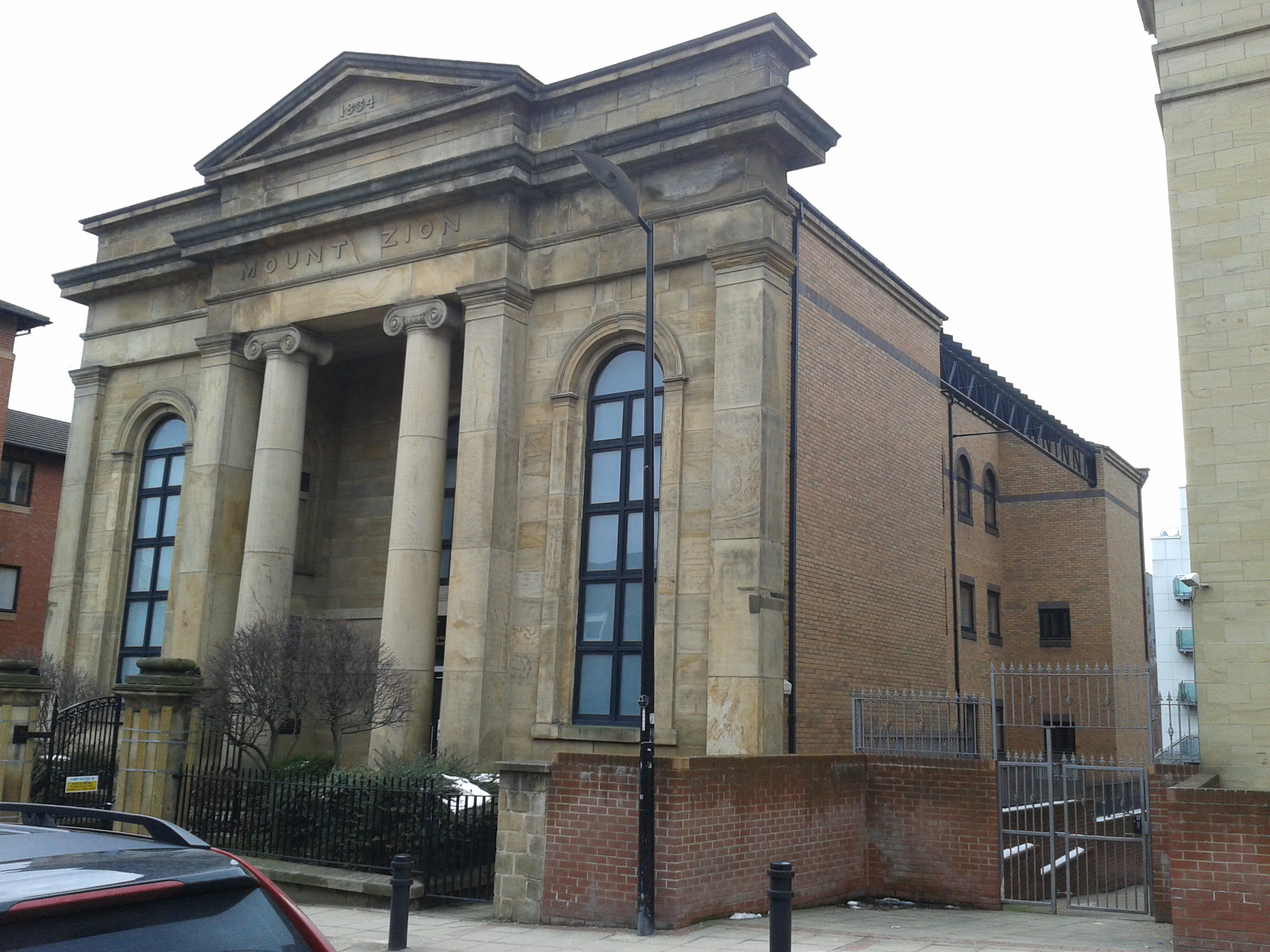
Facade of 20 Westfield Terrace which served as the out-patients department

The facility had its origins in a public dispensary which opened in 1832. It became known as the Sheffield Public Dispensary Hospital after it was extended in 1860 and it became known as the Sheffield Public Hospital after it was extended again in 1870.

The hospital was completely rebuilt in the early 1890s and was officially opened by the Duchess of York as the Sheffield Royal Hospital on 11 May 1895. A new nurses' home was completed in the late 1890s. The Mount Zion chapel on Westfield Terrace, with its impressive facade in Classical Revival style with projecting portico with pediment and a pair of giant Ionic columns in antis, was acquired in 1922. Once the chapel had been converted into an out-patients department, it was officially opened in its new role by the Minister of Health, Neville Chamberlain, in 1927.

The hospital joined the National Health Service in 1948 and, after services had transferred to the Royal Hallamshire Hospital, it closed in 1978.

The buildings were demolished in 1981, except for the facade of the former Mount Zion Chapel on Westfield Terrace, which as a Grade II listed building, was converted into offices.
