= Jessop West =

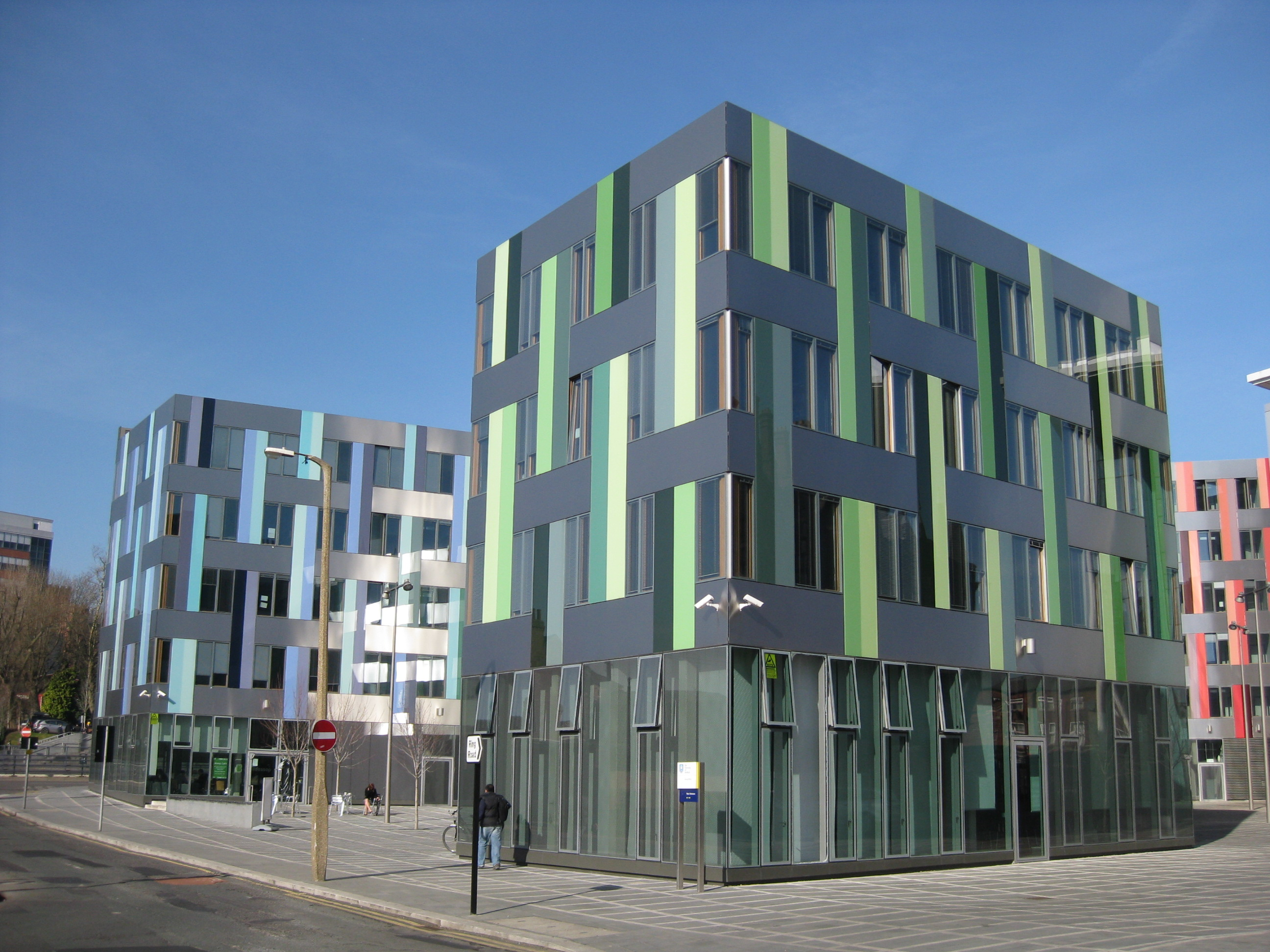
- Interactive map of the Jessop West area

General information
- Location: Sheffield, South Yorkshire, 1 Upper Hanover Street, Broomhall, Sheffield, S3 7RA
- Coordinates: 53.38127°N 1.483464°W
- Construction started: 2007
- Completed: 2009
- Cost: £21.2M

Design and construction
- Architect: Sauerbruch Hutton

Other information
- Public transit access: B Y University of Sheffield

Jessop West is a building in Sheffield, South Yorkshire, and is part of the University of Sheffield. Designed by Berlin-based architectural firm Sauerbruch Hutton, it was completed in 2009, and is on the corner of Leafygreave Road and Upper Hanover Street, opposite the Information Commons.

== History ==
The building was originally designed to accommodate the University's law, history and English departments, with each taking one of the three wings of the building, but coinciding with the ongoing refurbishment to the Arts Tower, the School of Languages and Cultures replaced the law department, which instead took residence in Bartolomé House. In 2025, the introduction of SLAS (School of Languages, Arts and Societies) saw all modern language staff offices and the music office replace the department of History.

It was designed as part of a wider project to pedestrianise the Leavygreave Road segment of the campus, incorporating the former Jessop Hospital site, closed in 2001, part of which now houses the University's music department.

Professor Henk de Berg has his office situated in Jessop West.

== Architecture ==
The building is passively ventilated and clad in stainless steel and coloured glass, which is triple glazed to minimise road noise from the busy street outside, and was specially designed for the building.

The ground floor is open to the public, with the Jessop Café on one side, and an open visitor centre and foyer, which has in the past hosted exhibitions and art shows.
