= The Diamond, Sheffield =

Building at the University of Sheffield, England

The Diamond
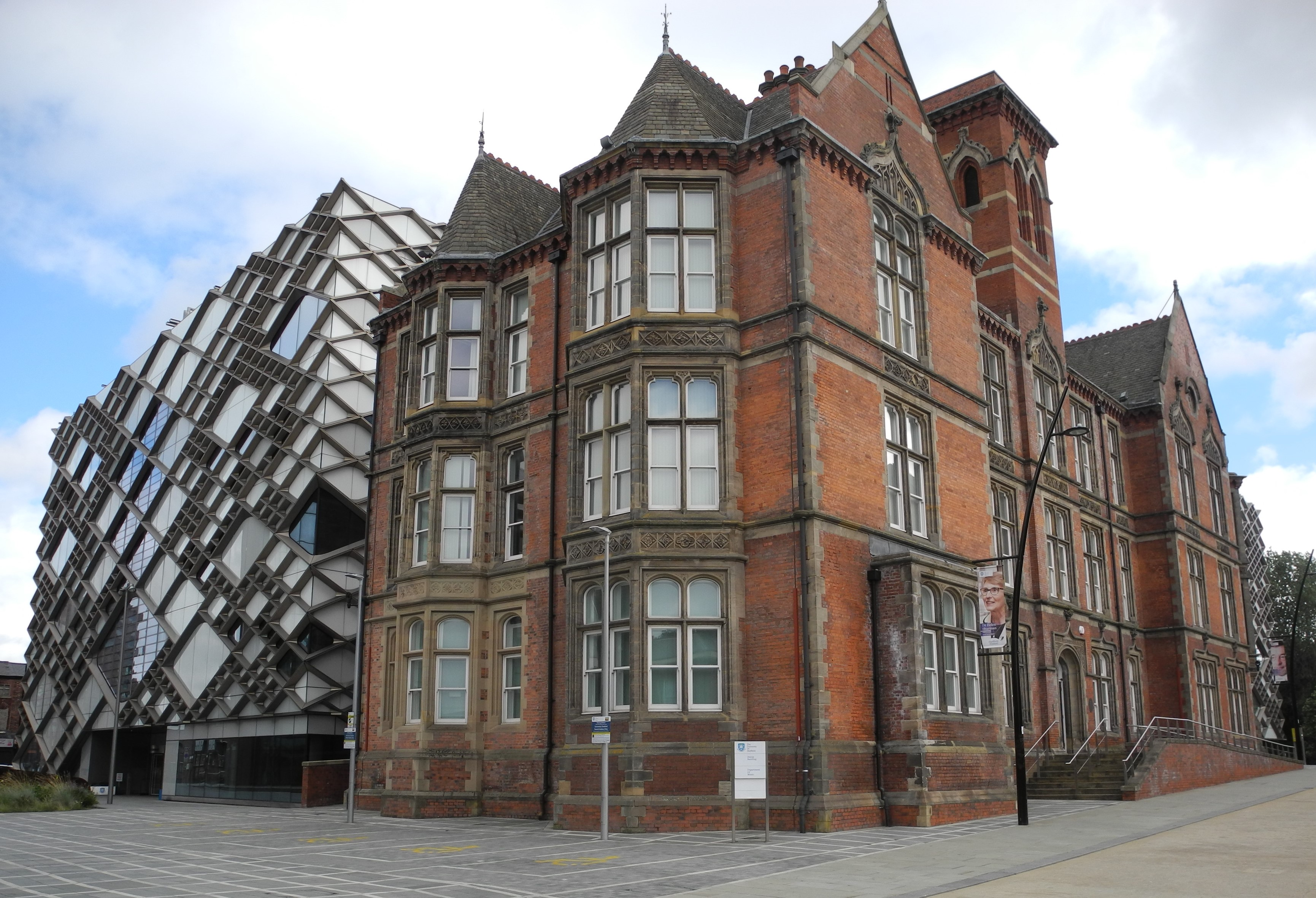
- The Diamond (left), with Jessop Wing in foreground
- Interactive map of the The Diamond area

General information
- Location: Sheffield, South Yorkshire, England, 32 Leavygreave Rd, Broomhall, S3 7RD
- Coordinates: 53.38154°N 1.48160°W
- Construction started: 2013
- Completed: 2015
- Cost: £81M

Technical details
- Floor count: 6

Design and construction
- Architect: Twelve Architects

Other information
- Public transit access: B Y University of Sheffield

The Diamond is a building in Sheffield, South Yorkshire, part of the University of Sheffield. Housing specialist engineering facilities as well as seminar room and open plan study spaces, it was completed in September 2015 at a cost of £81 million, the largest capital investment ever made by the university. It is situated on Leavygreave Road, between the Jessop Wing and St George's Church.

== History ==
The Diamond was built to replace the Grade II-listed Edwardian wing of the Jessop Hospital, taking over from the Sir Frederick Mappin Building as the new home of the Faculty of Engineering, the largest faculty at the university, with the goal to double student numbers in the faculty by 2021. Construction work began in July 2013 and the building opened in September 2015, in time for the start of that year's autumn semester.

== Building ==
The building takes its name from its unique facade, which comprises a cellular pattern of interconnected diamond shapes made of anodised aluminium, inspired by the form of diamond at a molecular level, over a frame of reinforced concrete and exterior glass cladding. It has nine lecture theatres, nineteen laboratories and more than thirty classrooms, linked by a central atrium area with a large study space and a café. Within the atrium, curved pods house IT suites and small seminar rooms.

== Reaction ==
Reaction to the building was mixed. It received a commendation from the British Constructional Steelwork Association Structural Steel Design Awards for its design and construction, and MP for Sheffield Central Paul Blomfield commented that the building would be "the jewel in the crown not only for the University itself, but also for the city". It was shortlisted for the 2016 Carbuncle Cup, awarded to the ugliest new building in the UK. The architectural magazine Building Design described it thus: "with the efficiency of a twin-thrust turbo engine, it commits sins on both the outside and the inside."
