= Endcliffe Student Village =

University of Sheffield student accommodation

Ranmoor/Endcliffe is a development of student accommodation for the University of Sheffield, located in Endcliffe in west Sheffield between Fulwood Road, Endcliffe Vale Road and Westbourne Road. The village accommodates most of the university's first-year undergraduates, alongside some second- and third-years, postgraduates and student families.

The site includes buildings with a long history as student residences (Stephenson Hall, Crewe Flats, Halifax Hall) and several new apartment buildings, typically 4–5 storeys high. Construction of these blocks began in 2006, after the demolition of Sorby Hall and Earnshaw Hall and was completed with the addition of the redevelopment of Ranmoor House, now known as the Ranmoor Village.

Of the new apartment blocks, the two largest are known as Howden and Derwent. All of the apartment blocks are named after climbing crags in the Peak District of Derbyshire. At the centre of the Endcliffe Student Village are The Edge, a two-storey dining hall, bar and IT centre that contains staff offices and staff conference facilities.

== Blue plaque ==
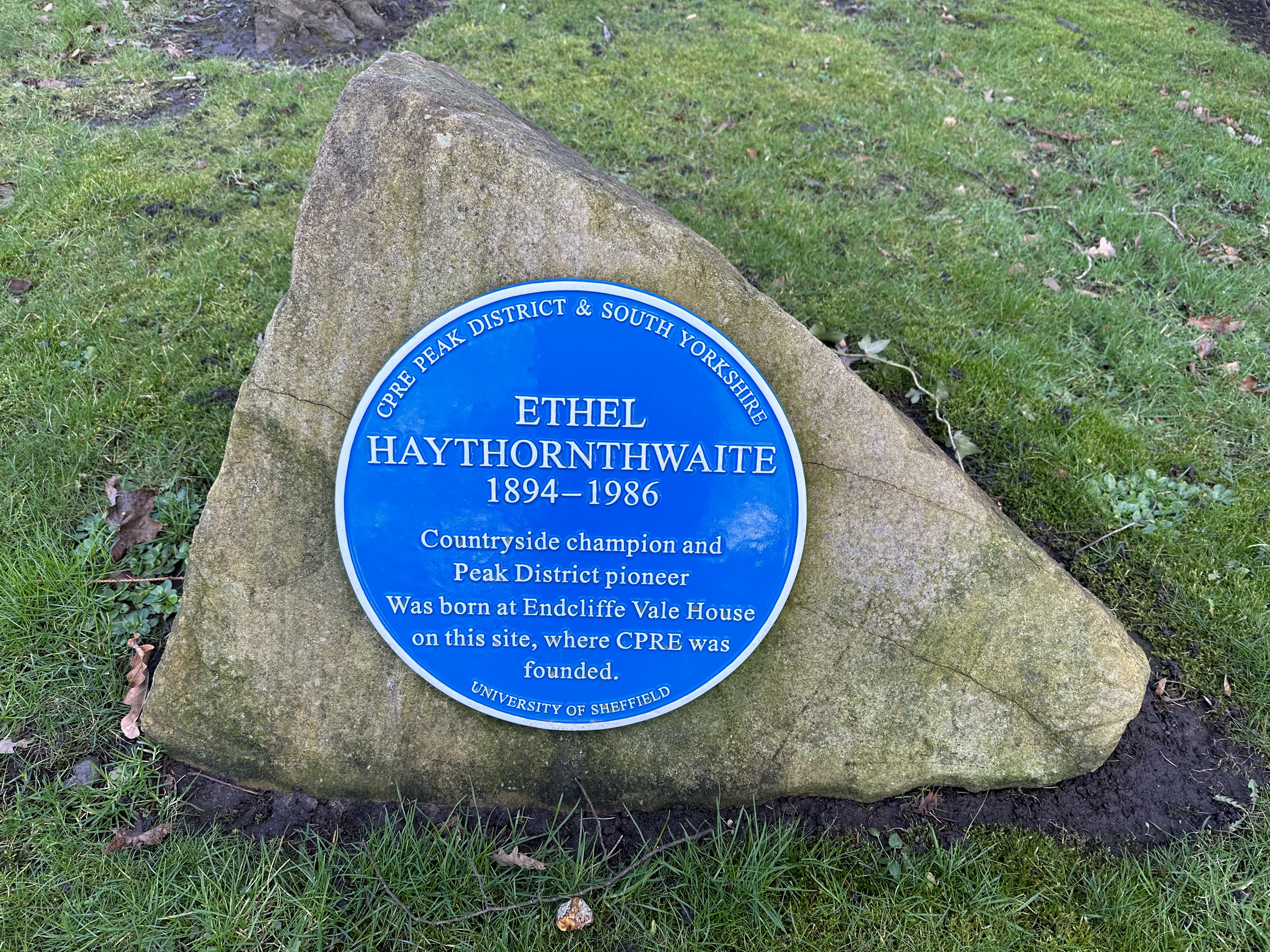
Blue plaque found at Endcliffe Student Village

On 25 May 2022, a blue plaque to commemorate the life of one of Sheffield and the Peak District’s leading environmentalists and most influential women was put in place. The plaque is located on the grounds opposite to The Edge where Ethel Haythornthwaite was born and the CPRE charity was founded.

Plaque was officially unveiled by Dame Fiona Reynolds DBE, the CPRE Peak District and South Yorkshire branch president and an honorary graduate of the University of Sheffield.
