= 2022–2023 University of Sheffield protests =

Student protests in England

2022–2023 University of Sheffield protest
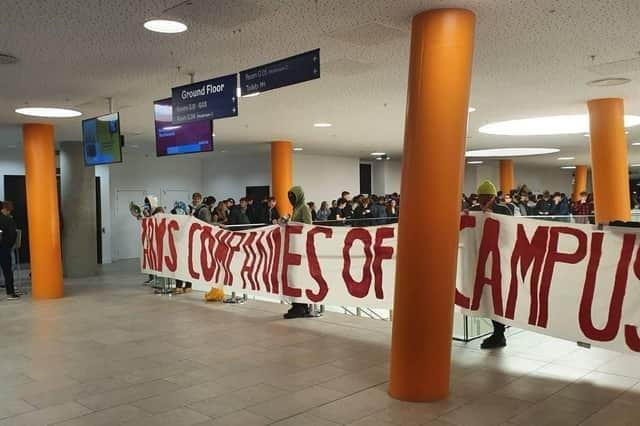
- Occupation in The Diamond building
- Date: 24 October 2022 – September 2023
- Location: University of Sheffield
- Goals: 2022–2023: University to cut ties with companies involved in arms manufacturing (Rolls Royce, BAE Systems and Boeing).; 2023–2023: Solidarity with ongoing UCU strikes
- Methods: Occupation; Online activism
- Status: Ended

Parties
Sheffield Action Group (Students), Sheffield Solidarity Group (Students)	University of Sheffield

The 2022–2023 University of Sheffield protests were student protests at the University of Sheffield in England. The protests ended in October 2023.

== Background ==
The protests was in reaction to the University of Sheffield working with and accepting payment for various activities from companies including Rolls Royce, BAE Systems, and Boeing who are involved in the arms manufacturing industry.

== Timeline ==
=== 2022 ===
==== Occupations ====
On 24 October 2022 Sheffield Action Group occupied the faculty of engineering's "The Diamond" building at the University of Sheffield. The group held up banners in support of removing companies involved in the arms industry from campus. In response to the occupation, the university relocated all teaching activities to other venues around campus. On 28 October 2022 High Court enforcement evicted the students from the building.

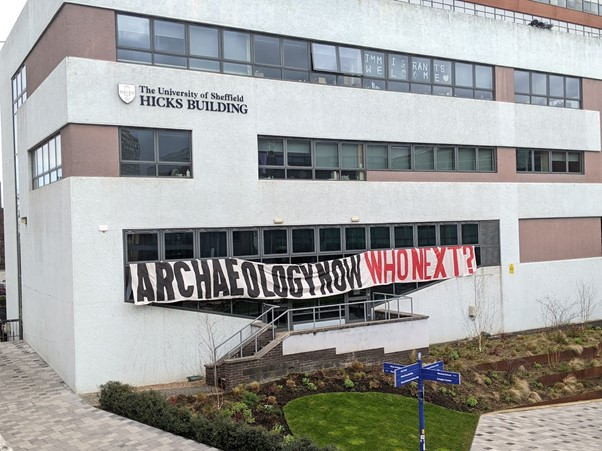
Hicks Building occupation

On 24 November 2022 Sheffield Action Group occupied the Hicks Building in solidarity with the University and College Union, and to continue to demand arms companies be removed from campus.

=== 2023 ===
==== Occupations ====
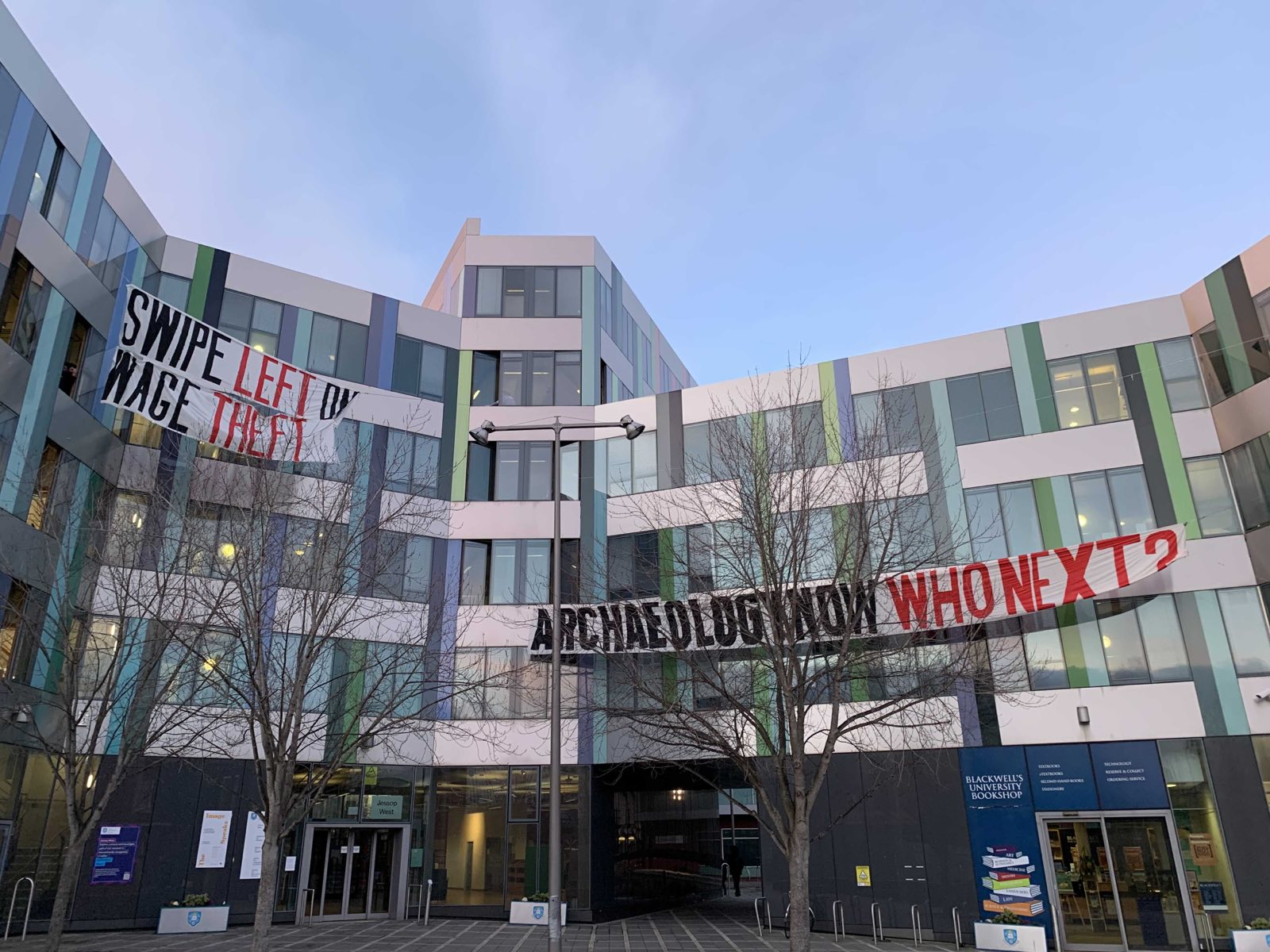
Jessop West occupation

On 12 February 2023 the group occupied the Jessop West building, and on 15 February 2023 they occupied the Hicks Building again, later expanding to occupy five buildings.

On 28 September 2023 around 7 pm 20 students occupied Arts Tower, both in protest against arms companies on campus and in solidarity with the ongoing UCU strikes. The occupation is currently ongoing. Classes due to take place in this building are being relocated or ran online, and the university HR department has been disrupted as a result of the occupation.

== Incidents ==
- During the Diamond Building occupation in 2022, security reportedly locked occupying student's personal belongings away, including medication.
- During the Hicks Building occupation in 2022, security locked fire exits and doors.

== Investigation ==
The university has been criticised for its handling of the occupations after two students received letters on 9 November 2022 stating that the university has hired private investigation firm Intersol Global to look in to possible involvement in the occupations. The university spent £39,615 on the investigation in total. Both students were able to prove they were not in the city. They believe they were profiled for earlier activism work.

The university was again criticised for using another firm, Horus Security Consultancy Ltd, which provided the university with information about a at the university group called Solidarity Slate.
