= Hughes Professor of Spanish =

The Hughes Professorship of Spanish is a named chair at the University of Sheffield. It was established as a lectureship in 1918 and altered to take its current form as a full professorship in 1953.

== History ==
The teaching of Spanish at the University of Sheffield has its origins in 1886, when F. T. Bianchi taught Spanish and Italian at Firth College, Sheffield. Teaching stopped in 1889, but was revived in 1897 when J. A. Swift was appointed lecturer in Spanish. When Firth College merged to become the university in 1905, he remained in place. After his death in 1914, Spanish teaching again lapsed. The university's treasurer Colonel Herbert Hughes proposed establishing a chair or lectureship in the subject. After his death, a memorial fund allowed for the establishment of the Hughes Lectureship in Spanish in 1918. Its first appointment was J. N. Birch. In 1953, the lectureship was converted into the modern Hughes Professorship.

== List of lecturers ==
- 1918–1937: J. N. Birch
- 1937–1946: Edward Sarmiento
- 1946–1953: Francis William "Frank" Pierce

== List of professors ==
- 1953–1980: Francis William "Frank" Pierce
- 1980–1994: Alfred Anthony Heathcote
- 1994–2003: Nicholas Grenville Round, FBA
- 2004–present: Phil Swanson
