= Henk de Berg =

Dutch sociologist

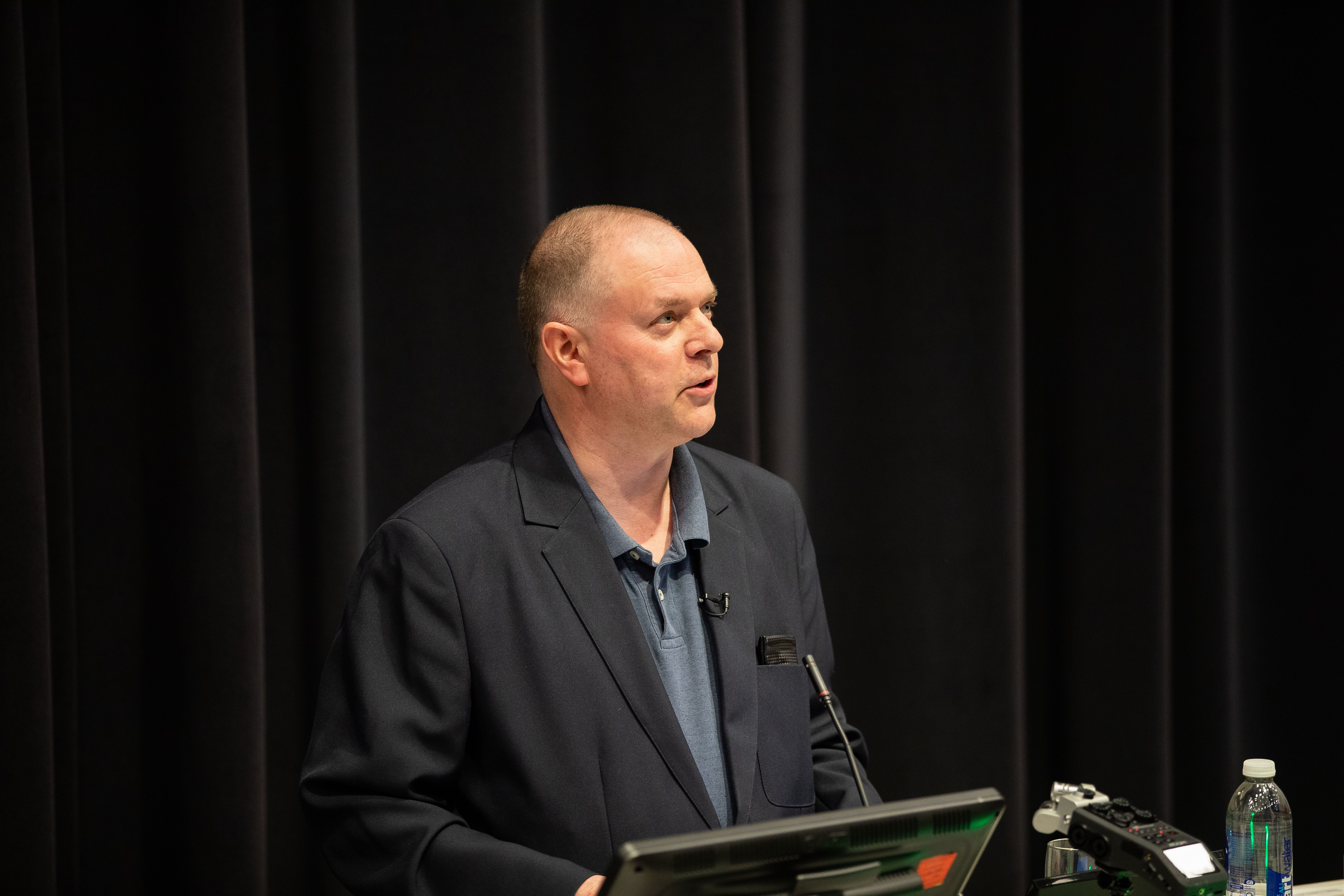
- Born: Harderwijk, Netherlands
- Occupation: Cultural theorist

Academic background
- Education: Leiden University

Henk de Berg (born 1963) is a Dutch cultural theorist and a professor of German at the University of Sheffield. His younger brother is the computer scientist Mark de Berg.

== Career and research ==
De Berg studied at the University of Leiden and the University of Siegen, receiving his PhD in comparative literature from Leiden in 1994. In 1996, he moved to the UK to take up a post in the German department of the University of Sheffield. He was appointed Professor of German in 2004.

Initially, Henk de Berg’s main research area was the sociology of literature. He became known for his work on the “Leiden model” in Systemtheoretische Literaturwissenschaft, a model of (literary) communication that draws on ideas of Niklas Luhmann, J. L. Austin, and Quentin Skinner. In the early 2000s, his interests shifted to the study of culture more generally. His introductory book on classic psychoanalytic literary criticism received a Choice Outstanding Academic Titles award.

In 2024, Henk de Berg published Trump and Hitler: A Comparative Study in Lying, which compares and contrasts Donald Trump and Adolf Hitler as political performance artists. The argument put forward by the book is firstly that the two men use similar rhetorical strategies and secondly that while the problems faced by the Weimar Republic were more pronounced, it makes sense to draw parallels between the circumstances Hitler and Trump exploited to come to power (economic dislocation, dented national confidence, social division, male anxiety, loss of faith in the traditional political system, and an enabling conservative elite). By contrast, de Berg considers the characterization of Trump as “a fascist” historically misleading and politically counterproductive.

== Works ==
=== Books ===
- Trump and Hitler: A Comparative Study in Lying London: Palgrave Macmillan, 2024). ISBN 978-3-031-51832-4
- Rethinking Ernst Bloch, ed. with Cat Moir (Leiden: E. J. Brill, 2023; paperback 2024). ISBN 978-90-04-30856-5
- Tzvetan Todorov: Thinker and Humanist, ed. with Karine Zbinden (Rochester, NY: Camden House, 2020). ISBN 978-1-57113-996-2
- Modern German Thought from Kant to Habermas: An Annotated German-Language Reader, ed. with Duncan Large (Rochester, NY: Camden House, 2012). ISBN 978-1-57113-354-0
- Das Ende der Geschichte und der bürgerliche Rechtsstaat. Hegel – Kojève – Fukuyama (Tübingen / Basel: Francke, 2007). ISBN 978-3-7720-8205-4
- Freud’s Theory and Its Use in Literary and Cultural Studies: An Introduction (Rochester, NY: Camden House, 2003; paperback 2004). ISBN 978-1-57113-301-4
- Rezeption und Reflexion. Zur Resonanz der Systemtheorie Niklas Luhmanns außerhalb der Soziologie, ed. with Johannes Schmidt (Frankfurt am Main: Suhrkamp, 2000; stw 1501). ISBN 3-518-29101-7
- Interpretation 2000: Positionen und Kontroversen. Festschrift zum 65. Geburtstag von Horst Steinmetz, ed. with Matthias Prangel (Heidelberg: Winter, 1999). ISBN 3-8253-0807-3
- Systemtheorie und Hermeneutik, ed. with Matthias Prangel (Tübingen / Basel: Francke, 1997). ISBN 3-7720-2177-8
- Differenzen. Systemtheorie zwischen Dekonstruktion und Konstruktivismus, ed. with Matthias Prangel (Tübingen / Basel: Francke, 1995). ISBN 3-7720-2154-9
- Kontext und Kontingenz. Kommunikationstheoretische Überlegungen zur Literaturhistoriographie. Mit einer Fallstudie zur Goethe-Rezeption des Jungen Deutschland (Opladen: Westdeutscher Verlag, 1995). ISBN 3-531-12747-0
- Kommunikation und Differenz. Systemtheoretische Ansätze in der Literatur- und Kunstwissenschaft, ed. with Matthias Prangel (Opladen: Westdeutscher Verlag, 1993). ISBN 3-531-12411-0

=== Selected papers ===
- "Fear of the Martians: On Slavoj Žižek’s Uses of Argument"; in Paragraph: A Journal of Modern Critical Theory 38.3, 2015, pp. 347–68.
- "Mia gegen den Rest der Welt. Zu Juli Zehs Corpus Delict", in Kalina Kupczynska and Artur Pelka (eds.), Repräsentationen des Ethischen (Frankfurt am Main: Peter Lang, 2013), pp. 25–48.
- "Die positivistische Versuchung. Zur Religionskritik in der Zukunft einer Illusion", in Kathy Zarnegin (ed.), Die Wissenschaft des Unbewussten (Würzburg: Königshausen & Neumann, 2010), pp. 33–53.
