= Sir Frederick Mappin Building =

Building in Sheffield, South Yorkshire, England

Coordinates: 53°22′55″N 1°28′45″W

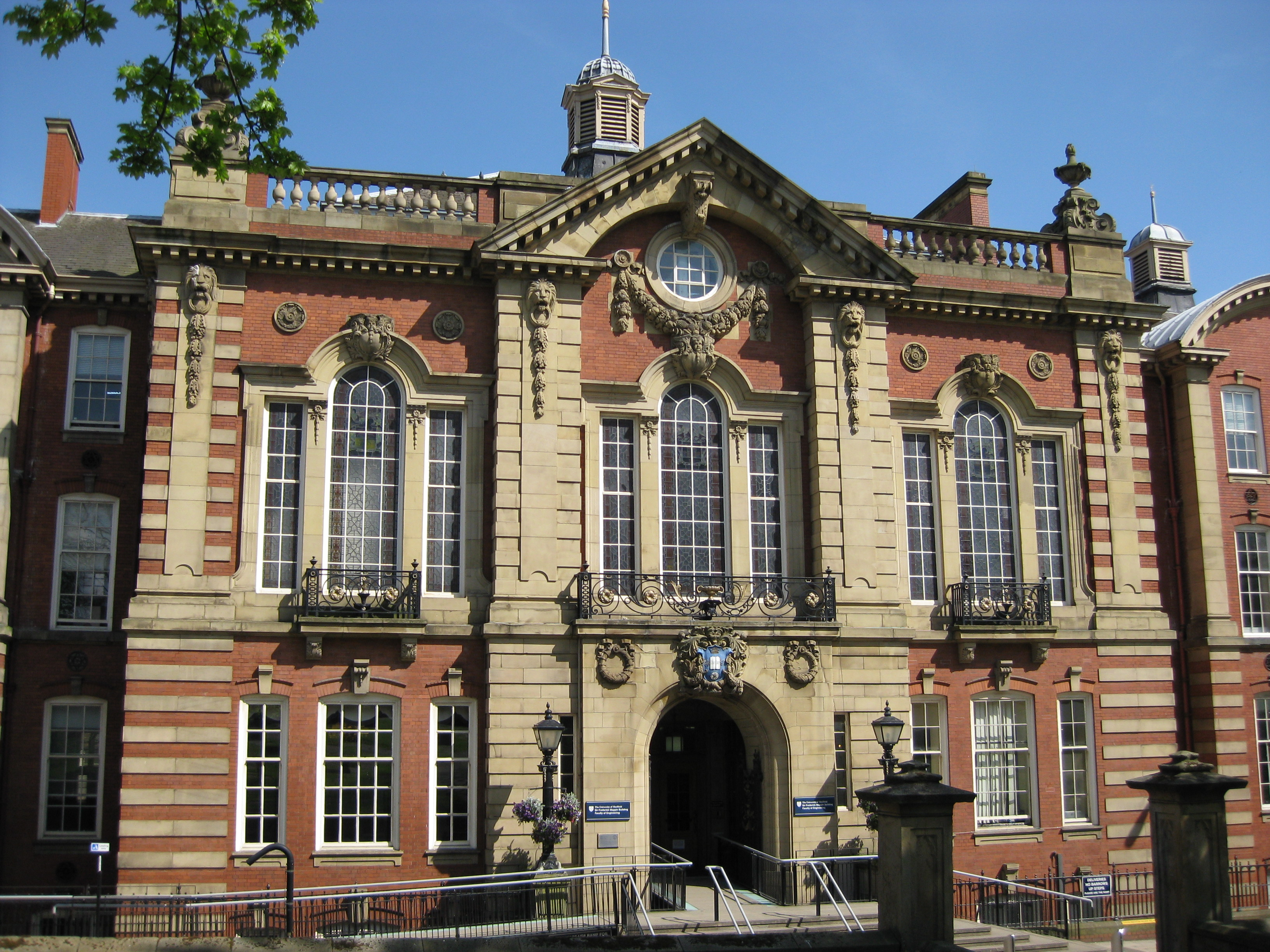
Mappin Street frontage of the Mappin Building

The Sir Frederick Mappin Building, or more familiarly the Mappin Building, is a Grade II listed building fronting onto Mappin Street, Sheffield, England, part of the University of Sheffield. The building and street (formerly Charlotte Street) are named after Sir Frederick Mappin (1821–1910), the so-called Father of Sheffield University.

== Departments ==
The Mappin Building is in an area known as the St George's Complex (after the St George's Church building, also owned by the University), and houses much of the Faculty of Engineering. Departments based there are Mechanical Engineering, Civil and Structural Engineering, Electronic and Electrical Engineering and the division Aerospace Engineering. The building also houses St George's IT centre, an open-access computer centre available to all university students during office hours. To the rear of the building is the Sir Robert Hadfield Building, home to two other departments: Chemical and Biological Engineering, and Materials Science and Engineering. The smaller Amy Johnson Building houses Automatic Control and Systems Engineering. The south wing of the Mappin Street frontage of the main building also housed the Department Of Geology until the department's closure in 1990.

== History ==
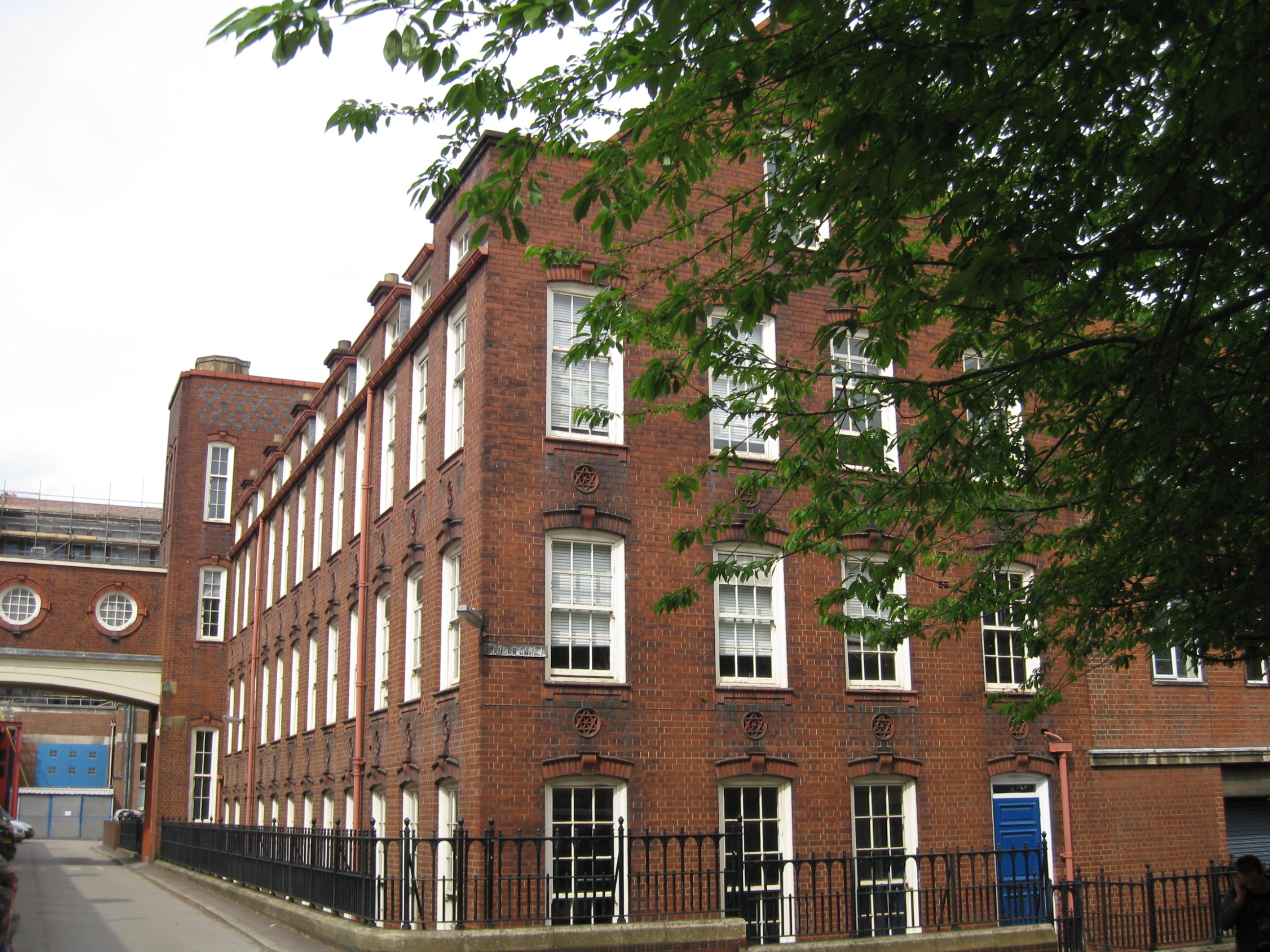
Technical School

The oldest part of the building is the former Technical School, the earliest purpose-built building for what is now the University. Designed by Flockton & Gibbs and completed in 1886, it now lies in the centre of the building. The extensive Mappin Street frontage was also designed by Flockton & Gibbs, in a far more demonstrative style. Work began on it in 1902 with the demolition of the former Grammar School on the site, but progressed in three phases and was finally completed in 1913. This part of the building includes the main entrance, the John Carr Library and Mappin Hall, a large panelled room with stained glass windows and decorative plaster ceiling, used for various events. It is connected to the Technical School by a bridge. Part of the northern range along Broad Lane and a building behind the Technical School followed, then the connecting Engineering Building along Broad Lane, completed in 1955. This gradual accretion has produced a complex plan and floor numbering scheme: the main entrance is on floor D, with floors A, B, C and C* existing at lower levels in various areas of the building, and floors E, F and G lying above.

== Notes and references ==
Notes

Bibliography

- Sheffield, Ruth Harman and John Minnis, Pevsner Architectural Guides
