= University of Sheffield =

Public university in Sheffield, South Yorkshire, England

- Coat of arms
- Motto: Rerum cognoscere causas (Latin)
- Motto in English: To discover the causes of things
- Type: Public research university
- Established: 1905 – University of Sheffield; Predecessor institutions: 1828 – Sheffield Medical School; 1879 – Firth College; 1884 – Sheffield Technical School; 1897 – University College of Sheffield
- Academic affiliations: ACU; N8 Group; Russell Group; Universities UK; White Rose; WUN; Defence Universities Alliance
- Endowment: £59.0 million (2025)
- Budget: £845.2 million (2024/25)
- Chancellor: Andy Haldane
- Vice-Chancellor: Koen Lamberts
- Academic staff: 3,865 (2024/25)
- Administrative staff: 4,640 (2024/25)
- Students: 28,280 (2024/25); 26,870 FTE (2024/25)
- Undergraduates: 20,215 (2024/25)
- Postgraduates: 8,065 (2024/25)
- Location: Sheffield, England; 53°22′53″N 01°29′19″W
- Campus: Urban
- Newspaper: Forge Press
- Public transit: B Y University of Sheffield
Colours
Violet (corporate)
Black and gold (sports)
- Website: sheffield.ac.uk

The University of Sheffield (informally Sheffield University or TUOS) is a public research university in Sheffield, South Yorkshire, England. Its history traces back to the foundation of Sheffield Medical School in 1828, Firth College in 1879 and Sheffield Technical School in 1884. The University College of Sheffield was subsequently formed by the amalgamation of the three institutions in 1897. It was granted a royal charter as the University of Sheffield in 1905 by King Edward VII.

Sheffield has 21 academic schools organised into five faculties. The annual income of the institution for 2024–25 was £845.2 million, of which £355.8 million was from tuition fees and education contracts (£401.8 million in the year prior), £204.2 million was from research grants and contracts, with an expenditure of £847.7 million.

The university is one of the original redbrick universities and a founding member of the Russell Group. It is also part of the Worldwide Universities Network, the N8 Group of the eight most research intensive universities in Northern England and the White Rose University Consortium. Six Nobel laureates have been affiliated with Sheffield as alumni or academics.

The university has a city campus just west of Sheffield city centre, which grew from two sites about 1 km apart, Western Bank (the main campus) and St George's (centred on engineering), that were joined up from the 1960s. Its buildings range from Victorian to modernist and contemporary, and 36 are listed, including the Arts Tower and Western Bank Library (both Grade II*).

In 2026, Sheffield was ranked 64th in 'The World's Top Universities' list by Time magazine. According to an independent report by London Economics published in July 2024, Sheffield generated £4.82 billion for the UK economy during the 2022–23 academic year, which was 6th among all UK universities, and supported 22,990 jobs across the country.

== History ==
=== Origins ===
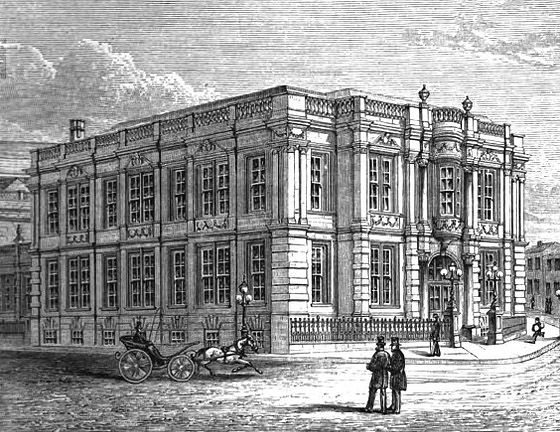
The original Firth College opened by former Master Cutler and Mayor of Sheffield Mark Firth in 1879

The University of Sheffield was formed by the merger of three local institutions: the Sheffield School of Medicine, Firth College, and the Sheffield Technical School. The oldest of these was the Sheffield School of Medicine. Surgeon-apothecary Hall Overend, began training medical students in Sheffield in 1811, conducting and teaching human dissection in an anatomy museum at his home in Church Street. Overend, however, was not registered as a lecturer with the Society of Apothecaries, a recognised body for medical education. Physicians and surgeons of the General Infirmary suggested that a school associated with the hospital would be highly eligible for recognition by the society. As a result, in 1828, a public meeting was called by physician Sir Arnold Knight, supported by Overend, to establish a new medical school. The Sheffield Medical Institution was formally opened a year later in 1829 on Surrey Street, with the Latin motto "Ars longa vita brevis" (art is long, life is short), referring to the difficulty of acquiring and practicing the art of medicine. Knight laid the foundation stone and delivered the opening lecture.

The University Extension Movement emerged in the 1870s with the aim of providing education in cities that lacked tertiary institutions. At that time, the steel industry in Sheffield was prospering and the city's population had doubled since the 1840s to around 240,000. In 1871, the university extension scheme arrived in Sheffield, and a group of lecturers from the universities of Oxford and Cambridge travelled to the city giving lectures and educating people about the benefits of tertiary education. Steel manufacturer and former mayor of Sheffield Mark Firth and clergyman Samuel Earnshaw organised courses in English literature and political economy. The popularity of the courses led Firth to donate £20,000 and purchase a site in the city centre (now Leopold Street and West Street) in 1877 to build a new institution for the classes. Firth College opened in 1879. The college saved the medical school from collapse and took over the teaching of basic science to medical students. In 1888 the medical school relocated to a new building on Leopold Street.

A grant was secured in 1883 to fund a professor of metallurgy and mechanical engineering, and former mayor of Sheffield Sir Frederick Mappin began fundraising for a technical department in Firth College in 1884, raising £10,240. This opened in 1886 as the Sheffield Technical School. Many of the steel-making firms in Sheffield contributed to funding the technical school, and research from the school in turn helped develop new processes and products for the companies.

=== Foundation ===
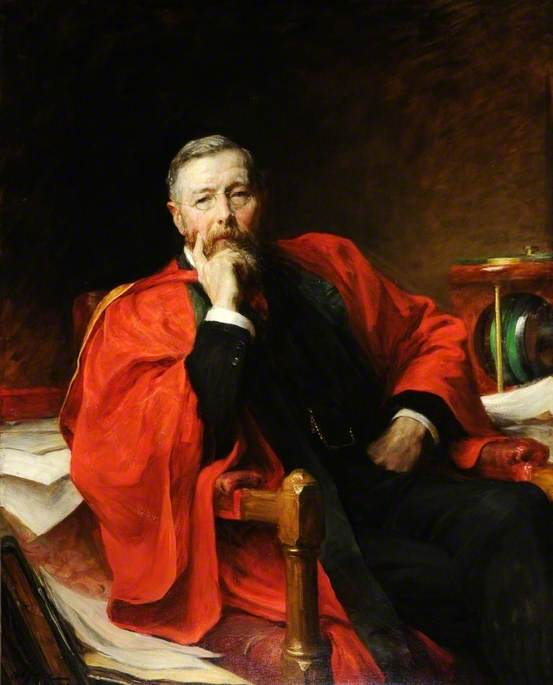
William Mitchinson Hicks was the founding vice-chancellor of the university

Sheffield was in the late 1890s the only large city in England without a university college. William Mitchinson Hicks, principal of Firth College from 1892 to 1897, had an ambition to establish a university in the city. To this end, Hicks worked towards the union of the three higher education institutions in Sheffield, to transform Firth College into a university college. He also extended the college by creating new departments and adding new buildings. In 1897, Firth College merged with the medical school and the technical school by royal charter to form the University College of Sheffield with Hicks served as its first principal. Hicks also advocated that the power to award its own degrees would attract talented staff to Sheffield. Six years after the foundation of the university college, on 18 May 1903, the college council passed a resolution to apply for a royal charter as a university. The university college started to develop its estate soon after: Western House by Weston Park on Western Bank was bought and demolished in 1903 for building a new university property. A building with a traditional collegiate quadrangle (later known as Western Bank building and now Firth Court) was planned on the site. Sir Frederick Mappin later successfully sought financial support from the Sheffield City Council and appealed for public donations. In 1904, steelworkers, coal miners, factory workers and the people of Sheffield donated over £50,000 via penny donations to help found the University of Sheffield.

When the Victoria University, which had consisted of colleges in Manchester, Liverpool and Leeds, split up into independent universities in the early 1900s, Yorkshire College in Leeds proposed taking the name "Victoria University of Yorkshire", but this was rejected by the Privy Council after University College Sheffield petitioned against it.

The university charter was sealed on 31 May 1905 and the university college became the University of Sheffield. On 12 July 1905, Firth Court on Western Bank was opened by King Edward VII and Queen Alexandra. St George's Square remained the centre of departments of applied science, and the departments of arts, medicine and science moved to Western Bank.

=== 20th century ===
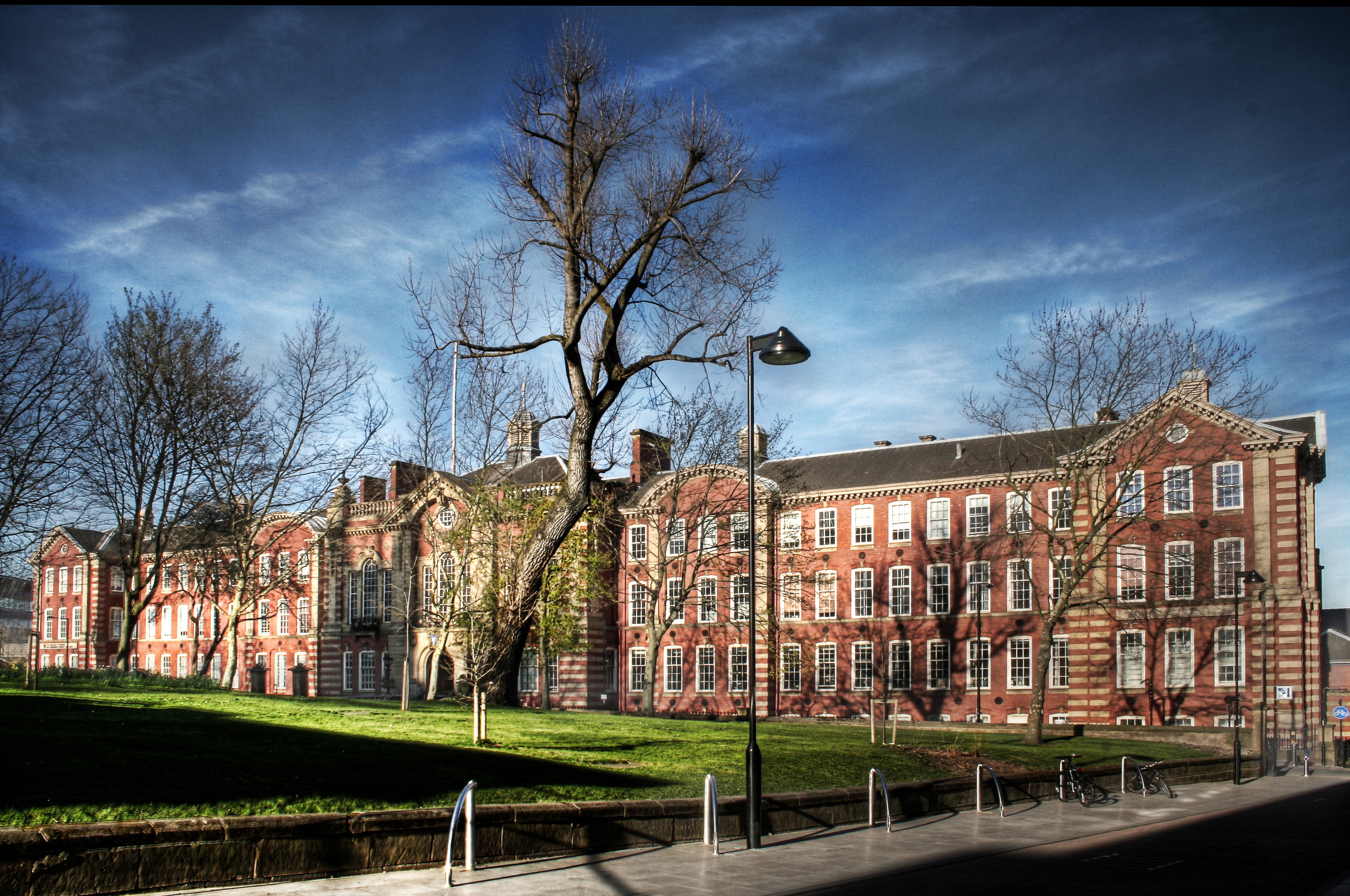
The Sir Frederick Mappin Building, home to the Faculty of Engineering, was refurbished from 2017 to 2020

In 1905, when the university first opened, there were 363 students, 114 of them full-time, and 71 staff. The Edgar Allen library was established in 1909 and Stephenson Hall, the first hall of residence, opened by 1919, when returning ex-servicemen pushed students numbers briefly over 1,000 after World War I before stabilising at around 750. The university continued to teach non-degree students on courses as diverse as cow keeping, razor grinding and (during the war) munitions making.

Hans Adolf Krebs was appointed as lecturer in pharmacology in 1935. At Sheffield, Krebs and his postgraduate student discovered the citric acid cycle (also known as the Krebs cycle) in 1937, which earned him a Nobel Prize in Physiology or Medicine in 1953. In 1938, the university opened the department of biochemistry and Krebs became its first head.

The university's origins in three separate institutions meant it was originally based on two sites: Firth Court on the Western Bank site and the Sir Frederick Mappin Building on the St George's site. Both sites have since expanded to almost come together on opposite sides of the A61 ring road. In 1943, the University Grants Committee predicted a 50 per cent expansion in student numbers once World War II was over. The university grew from its pre-war level of around 750 to 3,000 students by 1946, and there was pressure to expand further. The university announced a plan for development in 1947, which identified how the estate should grow. In the 1950s, the university established departments of chemistry and physics, built a new medical school, and expanded the facilities of law and arts by completing the Western Bank quadrangles, along with other campus developments.

George Porter joined the university as professor of physical chemistry in 1955 and he further developed his Nobel Prize-winning work flash photolysis at Sheffield. Porter was appointed Firth Professor of Chemistry and head of the department of chemistry in 1963.

The Western Bank Library opened in 1959 and the adjacent Arts Tower – the tallest academic building in Europe at the time – in 1965, along with other developments in the 1960s. The 1970s saw a new campus plan by Arup Associates that would have linked the two halves of the campus across the ring road with a glazed concourse, but this was never built. The multi-purpose Octagon Centre was opened in the 1980s.

The Traditional Heritage Museum was opened to the public in 1985 as part of the National Centre for English Cultural Tradition. It was created (and curated) by Prof John Widdowson in 1964 and was entirely run by volunteers and students. The museum housed collections including a replica kitchen from the 1920s, reconstructed workshops and retail shops, such as Pollard's tea and coffee. The university decided to close the Museum in 2011 because the building could not afford continued public access. In 2013, the collections from the Traditional Heritage Museum were relocated and are accessible again to the public. The majority of the items was transferred to not-for-profit organisation Green Estate (operators of the Sheffield Manor Lodge). Other major recipients include Sheffield Galleries and Museums Trust, Sheffield Industrial Museums Trust and Ken Hawley Trust.

In 1987 the university became one of the twelve founding universities of the Northern Consortium, set up to create pathways to recruit international students and now NCUK. The Krebs Institute for Biomolecular Research, named after Hans Krebs, was founded in 1988 as an interdisciplinary research institute drawing staff from multiple departments in the faculty of pure science. In 1995, the university took over the Sheffield and North Trent College of Nursing and Midwifery.

=== 21st century ===
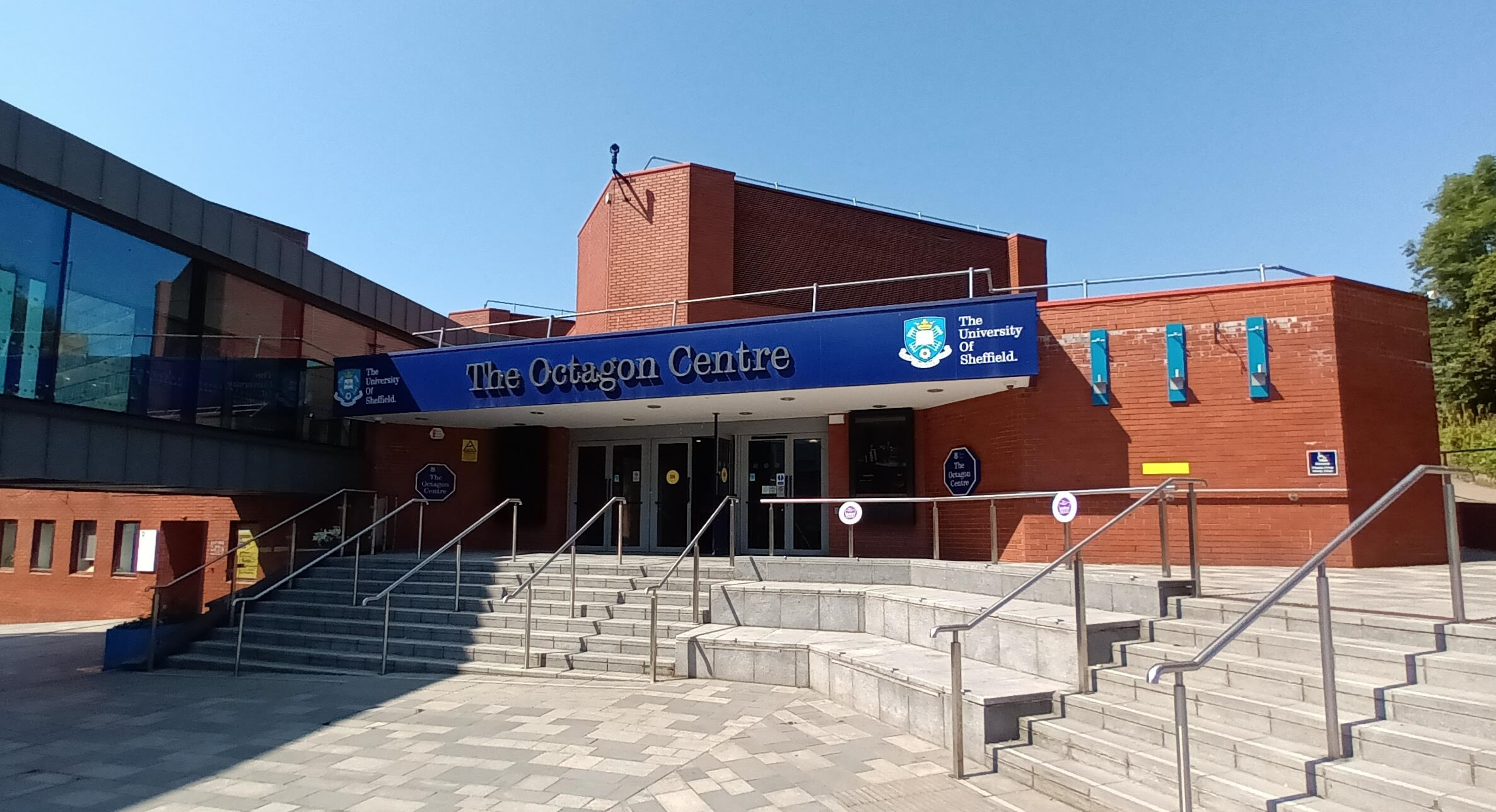
Octagon Centre, University of Sheffield

In 2005, the university bid to continue the nursing and midwife training it had been running since 1995. However, the South Yorkshire Strategic Health Authority decided to split the contact between Sheffield and Sheffield Hallam University, leading the university to pull out after analysing the costs and the operational difficulties associated with providing the training. Following a three-year teach-out of nursing courses, only the graduate school of nursing was expected to remain in operation.

In September 2015, a new six-storey building, The Diamond, was opened. The University Concourse between the students' union and the Alfred Denny building was refurbished in 2019.

On 25 May 2021, the University of Sheffield Executive Board (UEB) voted to close the Department of Archaeology and move two areas into other departments; a world leading institution since its formation in 1976. The decision had been made through a commissioned Institutional Review process and was met with a petition signed by over 40,000 people.

In 2008, the university partnered with BAE Systems to launch a new Centre for Research in Active Control which aimed to improve the stealth of BAE Systems' submarines. In 2012 the Students Union voted in favour of the university ending all links with the arms trade.

In 2015, the court was abolished. This had been the university's supreme governing body since its foundation, with membership including the Sheffield MPs, the bishops of Sheffield and Hallam, the chief constable of South Yorkshire Police, and representatives of professional bodies such as the Royal Society and General Medical Council.

In October 2022, student protestors occupied 'The Diamond' over the university's alleged links with Rolls-Royce, and their involvement in arms manufacture. This resulted in the closure of the building, with the occupiers refusing to leave until negotiations with the vice-chancellor commenced. Over the past eight years, the university has received some £47 million from Rolls-Royce. The following month, the university hired a private investigator to investigate two students for "alleged misconduct" in relation to the protests. In November 2023, students interrupted the opening ceremony of the university's newest building, in support of Palestine and in protest over the university's financial contracts with arms manufacturers, including BAE Systems, GKN and Boeing.

== Campus and locations ==
The University of Sheffield is a city-based university rather than a campus university, with many of its 290 buildings located in close proximity to each other in the city centre campus on the west side of the city centre. The university's halls of residence are mainly located in Endcliffe Student Village in Endcliffe and Ranmoor Student Village in Ranmoor (jointly referred to as "Ranmoor & Encliffe") on the western edge of the city. The university also has an innovation district at Parkway North and the Advanced Manufacturing Park at Parkway South, on either side of Sheffield Parkway on the eastern edge of the city. The university's sports pitches are at Norton Sports Park, 2.7 miles (4.3 km) south of the city centre campus.

=== City centre campus ===
The city centre campus is composed of an eclectic range of buildings from Victorian style to modernism to contemporary. The Sir Frederick Mappin Building and the Central Block are two Victorian university buildings, now linked by a contemporary curved glass roof constructed in 2020. Opened as the Western Bank Building, Firth Court is a red brick Edwardian building in Perpendicular Revival style, and is connected to the 1971 modernist Alfred Denny Building. The nearby Arts Tower is also an example of postwar modernist building in the International Style. The Diamond, a contemporary architecture designed by Twelve Architects, is situated next to the Victorian Jessop Building on the former site of Jessop's Edwardian wing.

A total of 36 university buildings are listed. Of these, the Arts Tower and Western Bank Library are Grade II* listed buildings, whilst Firth Court, Sir Frederick Mappin, St George's Church and the Jessop are Grade II listed.

The campus is divided into the Western Bank and St George's campuses on either side of the Sheffield Inner Ring Road, based around the two original sites of the University College of Sheffield.

==== Western Bank campus ====
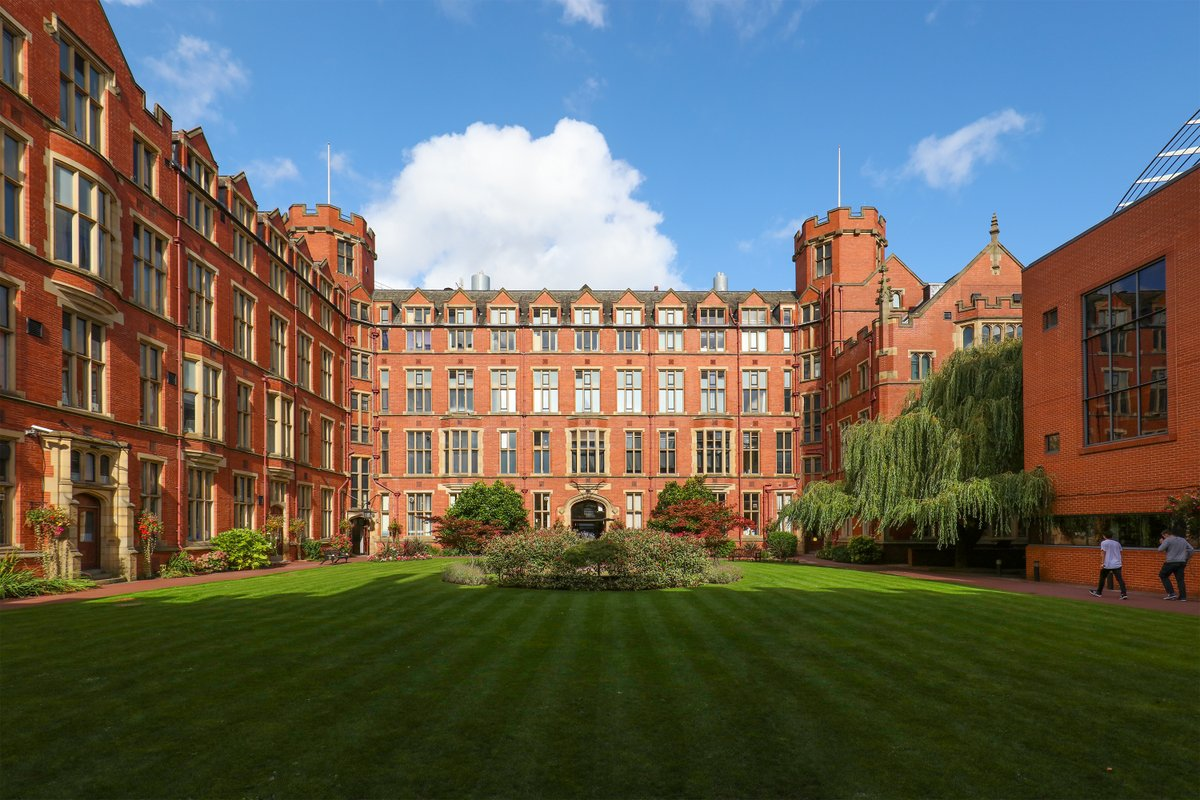
Firth Court on Western Bank is home to the biomedical sciences department and remains the main administrative centre of the university

The western part of the city centre campus, formerly known as the Western Bank campus, is bounded by Upper Hanover Street to the east, Glossop Road to the south, Clarkson Street to the west, and Bolsover Street to the north. The Western Bank road (A57) runs through the campus. The area to the north of Western Bank includes Firth Court, Alfred Denny Building, Western Bank Library and Arts Tower, Geography and Planning building, Bartolomé House, and Dainton and Richard Roberts Buildings. Within the southern area of the campus are the Sheffield Students' Union, the Octagon Centre, Graves Building and Hicks Building. A concourse under the A57 flyover connects Alfred Denny Building on the north side and Students' Union on the south. Until the completion of three pedestrian crossings on Western Bank in 2017, the concourse underpass was the only link that allowed students to easily move between buildings in this cluster. The Information Commons, a library and computing centre opened in 2007, is also located at the Western Bank Campus on Leavygreave Road. In addition, throughout 2010 the Western Bank Library received a £3.3 million restoration and refurbishment, the University of Sheffield Union of Students underwent a £5 million rebuild, and work commenced on a multimillion-pound refurbishment of the Grade II* listed Arts Tower to extend its lifespan by 30 years.

==== St George's campus ====
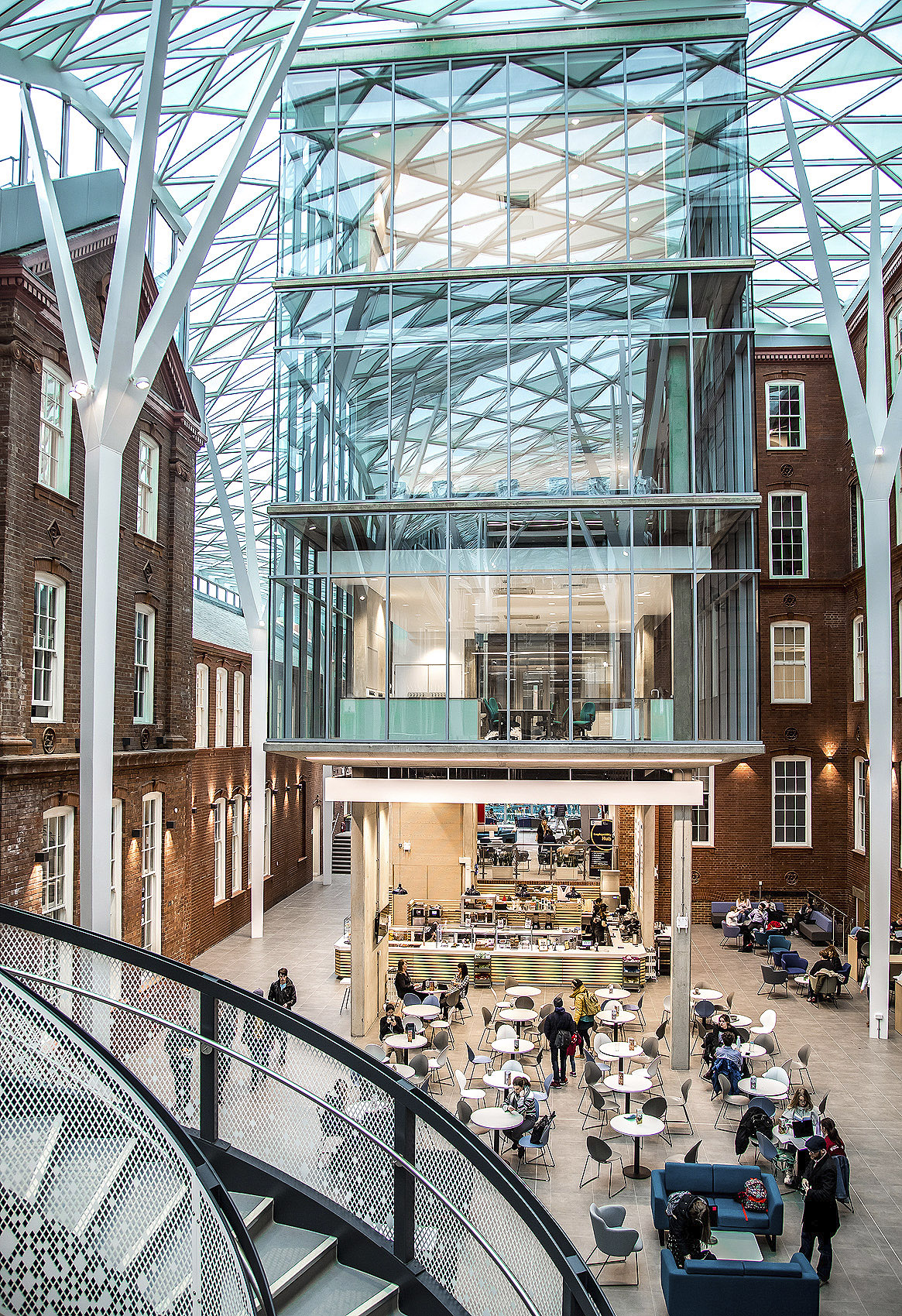
The Engineering Heartspace atrium, between Sir Frederick Mappin building and the central wing

The east part of the city campus was formerly known as the St George's campus (named after St George's Church) and as the east campus. This was the historical location of the Sheffield Technical School. The campus was bounded by Upper Hanover Street to the west, Broad Lane to the north, Rockingham Street to the east, and West Street to the south, and is part of St George's Quarter, one of the eleven official Sheffield city centre quarters. The faculty of engineering and the departments of journalism studies, economics and computer science are on Mappin Street, in the centre of the area. The university also maintains the Turner Museum of Glass in this area. The department of music is housed in the Victorian grade II-listed former Jessop Hospital, although the Edwardian wing of the hospital, also grade II-listed, was demolished. The demolished wing was replaced by The Diamond, a new multi-disciplinary building with lecture theatres, laboratories, workrooms and other facilities for the faculty of engineering that opened in September 2015.

Among other 21st-century additions to this area of the campus are the Soundhouse (2008; a music practice and studio facility) and the Jessop West building (2009; the first UK project by Berlin architects Sauerbruch Hutton).

The Sir Frederick Mappin Building is a Grade II-listed building that houses much of the faculty of engineering and St George's IT centre. A modern glass-roofed atrium, housing laboratories, offices and social spaces, joins the Mappin Building to the 1885 central wing.

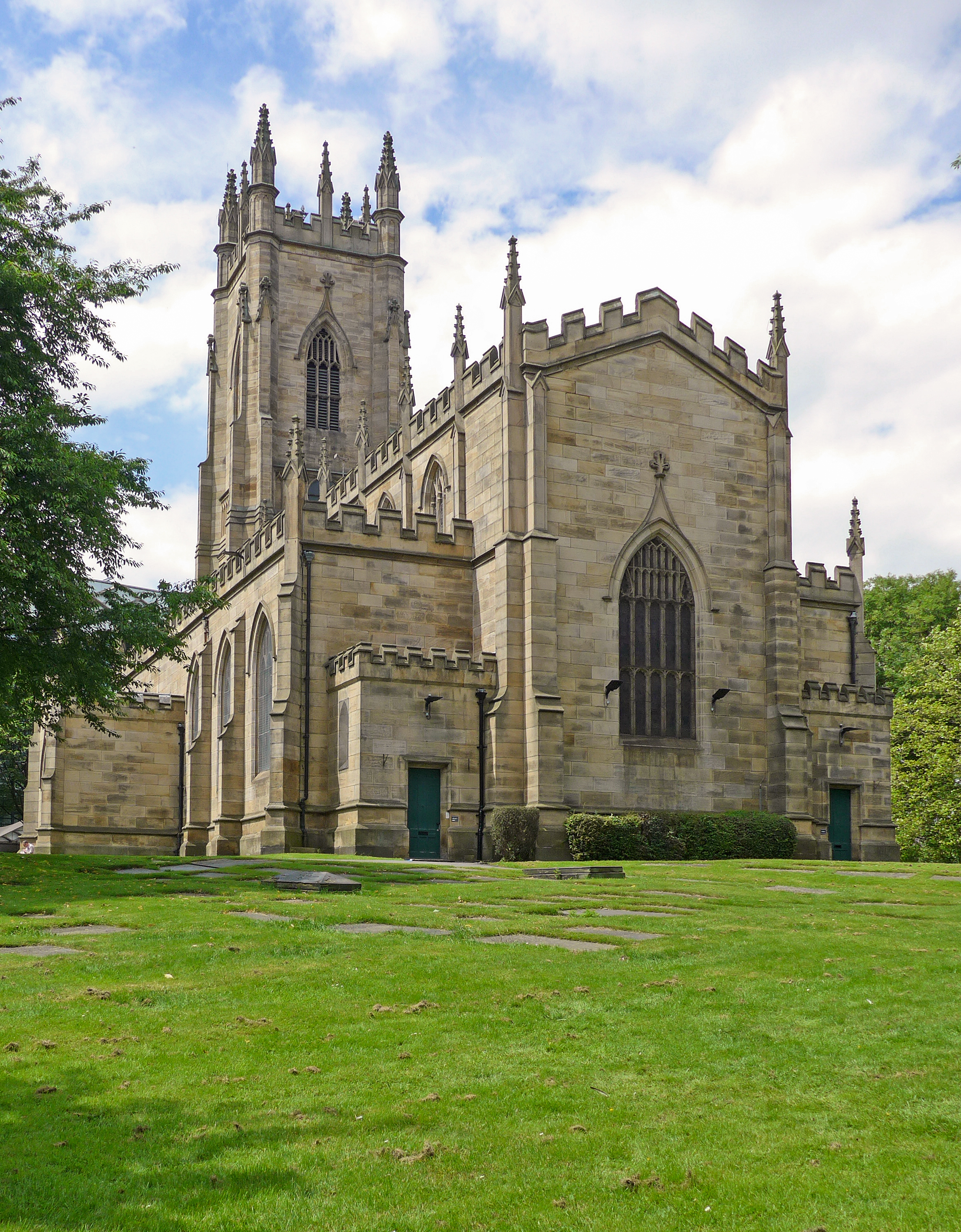
Former St George's Church, now a lecture theatre

St George's Church, after which the campus and quarter are named, was the first of three commissioners' churches to be built in Sheffield under the Church Building Act 1818. It was built in the Perpendicular style. The church closed in 1981 and was acquired by the university. It was converted for use as a lecture theatre in 1994, while the upstairs has been converted for use as student accommodation.

On the north side of Broad Lane, opposite the engineering buildings, is an area formerly known as the north campus. This area houses the Kroto Research Institute, the Kroto Innovation Centre, the Nanoscience and Technology Building, the Graduate Research Centre, the George Porter Building and the International College.

==== West of Clarkson Street ====
The university's city centre campus has also expanded westward beyond Clarkson Street, the traditional edge of the Western Bank campus, into the area south of Weston Park. The university's sports facilities at Goodwin Sports Centre are located on the edge of the park, and the medical school and dental school are next to the Royal Hallamshire Hospital. The Sheffield Institute for Translational Neuroscience (SITraN), opened by Queen Elizabeth II in November 2010, the university's Drama Studio theatre and Sheffield's Confucius Institute are also in this area. The Wave, home of the faculty of social sciences, opened opposite the sports centre in 2023. It was designed to be a net zero-emission building with ground-source heat pumps providing heating and cooling.

=== Student accommodation ===
The main university halls of residence are at the Ranmoor & Endcliffe campus, with some accommodation on the city centre campus. Ranmoor & Endcliffe is in the western suburbs of Sheffield, close to Broomhill and Ecclesall Road. It has over 4000 student rooms, 100 astudio ffosydd, and family homes. The Endcliffe Student Village was opened in 2008 and the Ranmoor Student Village in 2009. Ranmoor House, which opened in 1968, was once the largest hall of residence at the university, housing around 800 students; it was demolished in March 2008, a year before the new Ranmoor Student Village opened. Accommodation on the city centre campus is provided at Allen Court, St. George's Flats and St Vincent's Place, offering over 1500 rooms.

Sheffield Student Housing Co-operative, a student housing cooperative provides not-for-profit, student-managed housing for its members.

=== Former locations ===
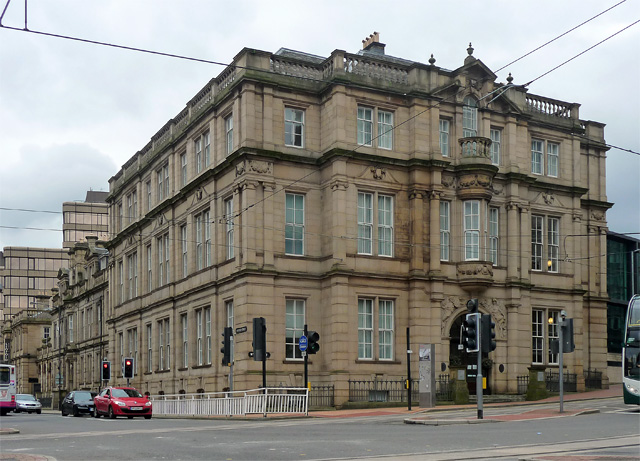
Former Firth College building

The old Firth College building, dating to 1879–80, was located at the corner of Leopold Street and West Street. It was designed by T.J. Flockton and E.R. Robson with the front facing West Street. Opposite this building, at 7 Leopold Street, was the old Medical School building, which was designed by John Dodsley Webster and completed in 1888. Both Firth College and the Medical School left these buildings following the establishment of the university in 1905.

The Manvers campus at Wath-on-Dearne was where the majority of nursing was taught. Humphry Davy House (named after the chemist) was constructed in 1998 to house the School of Nursing and Midwifery and was located at Golden Smithies Lane. The School had been established in 1995 following the integration of the Sheffield and North Trent College of Nursing and Midwifery, into the university. In 2004, following changes to the nursing and midwifery training contract offered by the NHS, the University opted to close the campus. The final intake of Midwifery Studies students was in July 2006 and the site closed one year later.

=== Environmental initiatives ===
The University of Sheffield has committed to reaching Net Zero on Scope 1 and 2 emissions by 2038 and on Scope 3 emissions by 2045. The university received bronze accreditation with the Hedgehog Friendly Campus campaign in 2020, silver accreditation in 2021 and gold accreditation in 2023. Sheffield is also a member of the Nature Positive Universities campaign and the UN Race to Zero campaign.

The university was ranked 83rd (2:2 class) in the 2025/26 People and Planet University League. Internationally, the university was ranked joint 33rd globally for sustainability in the QS World University Rankings: Sustainability 2026 and in the 101–200 range globally in the 2025 Times Higher Education Impact Rankings, based on the UN Sustainable Development Goals.

== Organisation ==
=== Faculties and schools ===
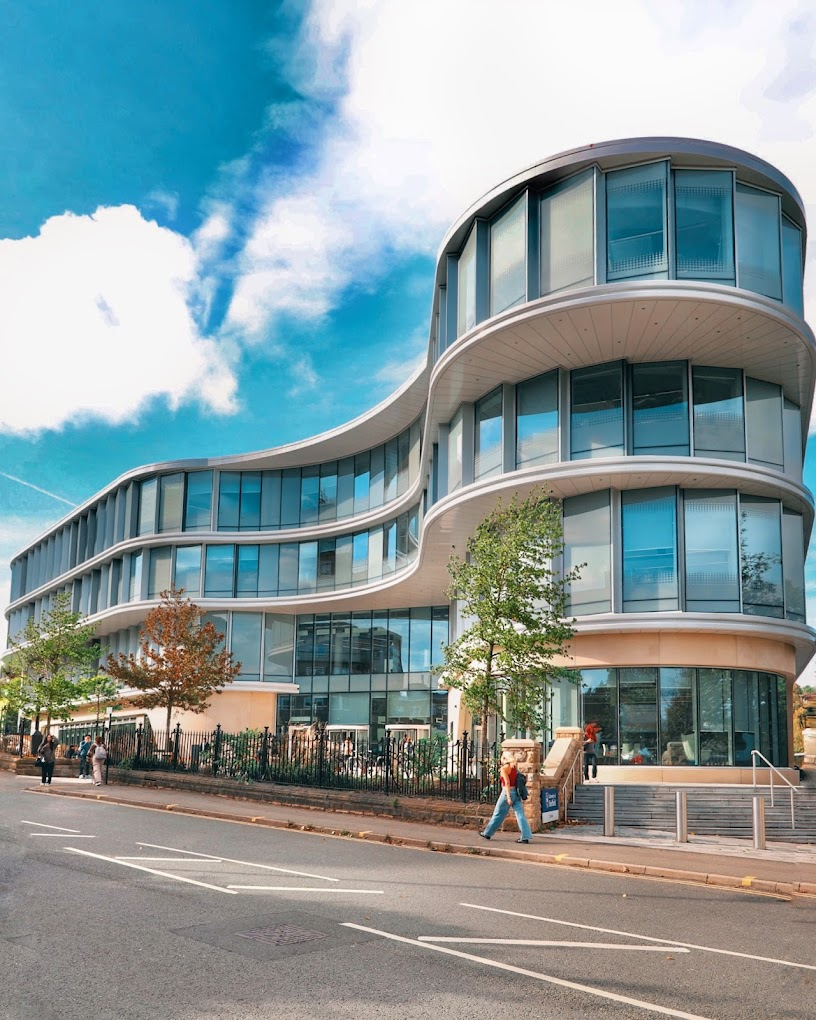
The Wave, home of the faculty of social sciences

The university has five academic faculties, into which 21 academic schools are organised:

- Faculty of arts and humanities
  - School of English
  - School of history, philosophy and digital humanities
  - School of languages, arts and societies
  - School of law
- Faculty of engineering
  - School of chemical, materials and biological engineering
  - School of computer science
  - School of electrical and electronic engineering
  - School of mechanical, aerospace and civil engineering
- Faculty of health
  - School of allied health professions, nursing and midwifery
  - School of clinical dentistry
  - School of medicine and population health (including the medical school)
- Faculty of science
  - School of biosciences
  - School of mathematical and physical sciences
  - School of psychology
- Faculty of social sciences
  - School of architecture and landscape
  - School of economics
  - School of education
  - School of geography and planning
  - School of information, journalism and communication
  - Management school
  - School of sociological studies, politics and international relations

=== Former faculties ===
Sheffield had four faculties in 1905, which were arts, pure science, medicine and applied science. The faculty of applied science was split into engineering and metallurgy in 1919.

==== International faculty ====
The University previously had an international faculty known as CITY College, located in Thessaloniki, Greece. It was established in 1989 and was a separate, private legal entity established under Greek law. The International Faculty was organised into four departments (business administration and economics, psychology, computer science, and english studies). The faculty also operated the South East European Research Centre, a multidisciplinary research centre established in 2003.

In 2024, the University ended their partnership with CITY College, which became part of the University of York.

=== Governance ===
==== Bodies ====
The bodies which govern the university under the terms of its royal charter are the council, the senate and the faculties.

The council is the governing body of the university. It is responsible for the strategic development, legal and regulatory affairs, and performance of university business (finance and property). Council membership comprises a majority of non-executive lay members appointed under the statutes of the university. The chair of council and pro-chancellor is Martin Temple.

The senate manages the academic side of the university. It is the highest academic authority of the university, and is also responsible for the regulation of research work and students' discipline. The senate is chaired by the vice-chancellor, with its membership drawn mainly from the university's academic staff.

The five faculties regulate departmental teaching, research, examination and admission. They are responsible for making recommendations to the senate on the award of degrees, fellowships, and academic staff appointments and promotions.

==== Officers ====
The officers of the university are the chancellor, the president and vice-chancellor, the chair of council and pro-chancellor, the vice-presidents and heads of the facilities, the vice-president for education, the vice-president for research and innovation, the university secretary, the treasurer, and two other pro-chancellors.

===== Chancellor =====
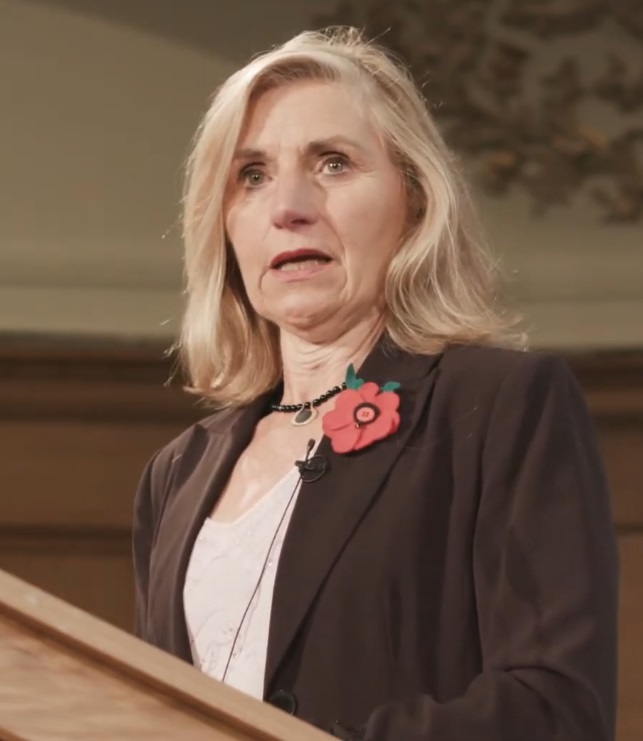
Dame Anne Rafferty, 8th chancellor of the university

The chancellor is the formal head of the university.

- 1905: Henry Fitzalan-Howard, 15th Duke of Norfolk
- 1917: Robert Crewe-Milnes, 1st Marquess of Crewe
- 1944: Henry Lascelles, 6th Earl of Harewood
- 1947: Edward Wood, 1st Earl of Halifax
- 1959: Rab Butler, Baron Butler
- 1979: Frederick Dainton, Baron Dainton
- 1999: Sir Peter Middleton
- 2015: Dame Anne Rafferty
- 2025: Andy Haldane

===== Vice-chancellor =====
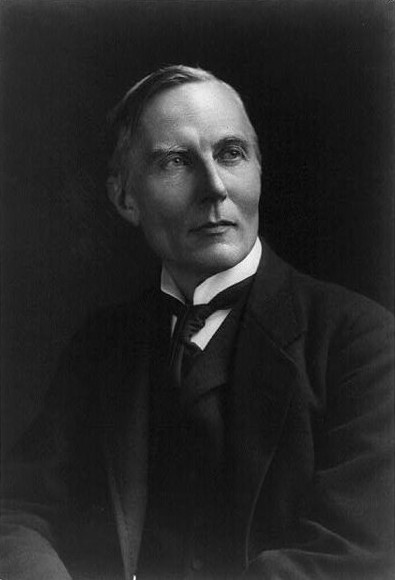
Herbert Albert Laurens Fisher, 3rd vice-chancellor of the university

The president and vice-chancellor is the chief executive officer of the university, as well as being the principal academic officer and the designated accountable officer. They are also chair of senate and an ex officio member of the council.

The university executive board is appointed by the vice-chancellor and serves in an advisory capacity. Its members are the president and vice-chancellor, the chief financial officer, the chief operating officer, the director of human resources, the five faculty vice-presidents, the vice-president for education, and the vice-president for research and innovation.

- 1905: William Mitchinson Hicks
- 1905: Sir Charles Eliot
- 1912: Herbert Fisher
- 1917: William Ripper (acting)
- 1919: Sir William Henry Hadow
- 1930: Sir Arthur Pickard-Cambridge
- 1938: Sir Irvine Masson
- 1953: John Macnaghten Whittaker
- 1965: Arthur Roy Clapham (acting)
- 1966: Sir Hugh Robson
- 1974: Geoffrey Sims
- 1991: Sir Gareth Roberts
- 2001: Bob Boucher
- 2007: Sir Keith Burnett
- 2018: Koen Lamberts

==== Finances ====
In the financial year ending 31 July 2024, the University of Sheffield had a total income of £887.9 million (2022/23 – £880.2 million) and total expenditure of £651.4 million (2022/23 – £790.5 million). Key sources of income included £401.8 million from tuition fees and education contracts (2022/23 – £397.5 million), £109.1 million from funding body grants (2022/23 – £111.5 million), £185.8 million from research grants and contracts (2022/23 – £198.6 million) and £32.6 million from endowment and investment income (2022/23 – £24.2 million).

At year end the University of Sheffield had endowments of £55.2 million (2022/23 – £47.1 million) and total net assets of £1.886 billion (2022/23 – £1.630 billion).

=== Coat of arms ===
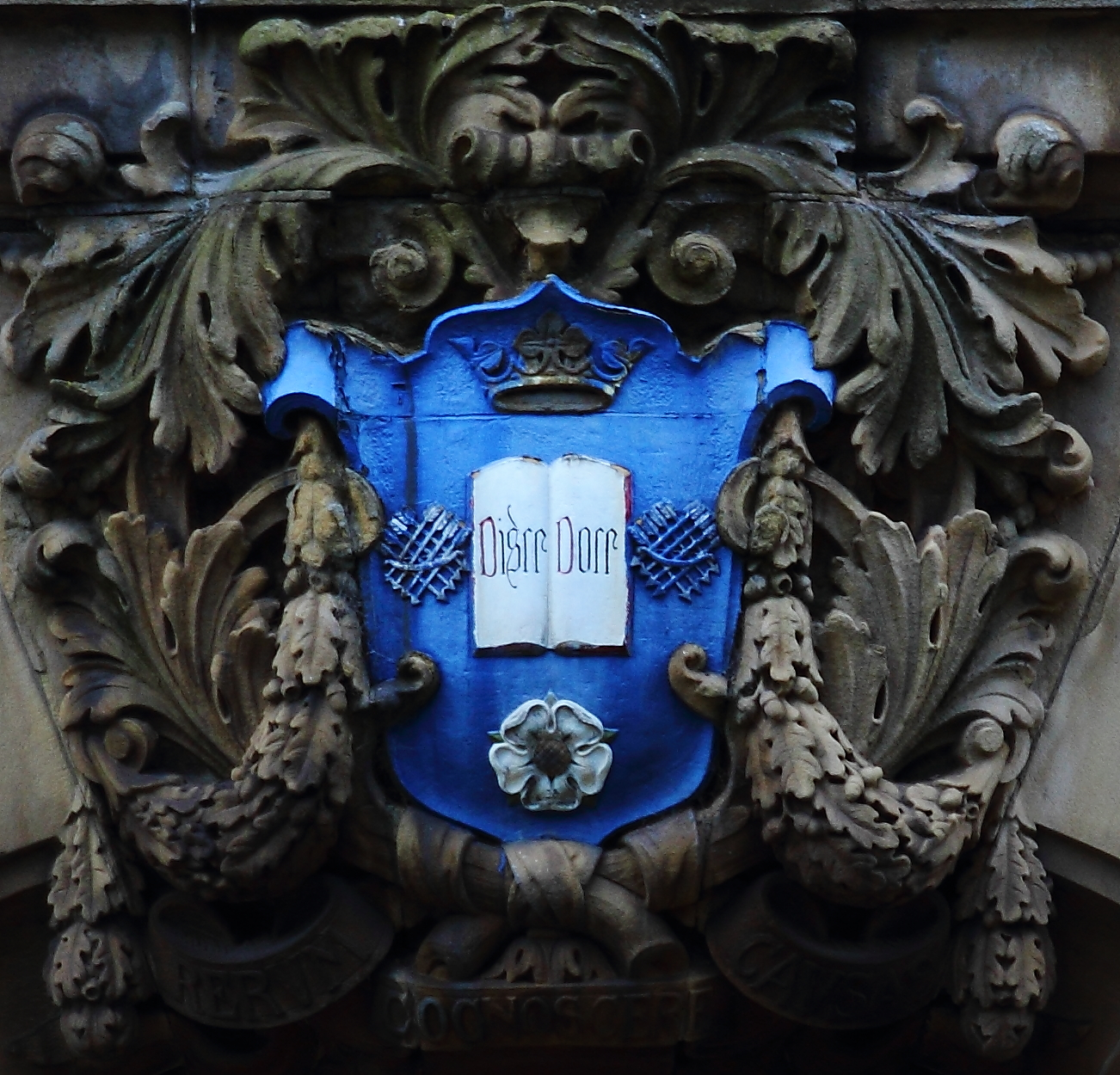
The University Coat of Arms, displayed on the front of Mappin Building

The arms of the university were granted by the College of Arms on 28 June 1905. They consist of a blue shield with a gold-edged book inscribed with Latin: Disce Doce (learn and teach) at its centre, a sheaf of eight silver arrows on either side (from the arms of the city), a gold crown ("the Crown of Success") and the White Rose of York. Below is a scroll carrying the motto "rerum cognoscere causas" (to discover the causes of things; from the Georgics (Note: From Book 2, line 490) by Latin poet Virgil), which was also the motto of Firth College. In heraldic terminology, the coat of arms is blazoned as follows:

Azure, an open book proper, edged gold, inscribed with the words Disce Doce between in fess two sheaves of eight arrows interlaced saltireways and banded argent, in chief an open crown or, and in base a rose also argent barbed and seeded proper.

The university's logo, consists of a redrawn version of the coat of arms and the name of the institution.

=== Ceremony ===
==== Academic dress ====
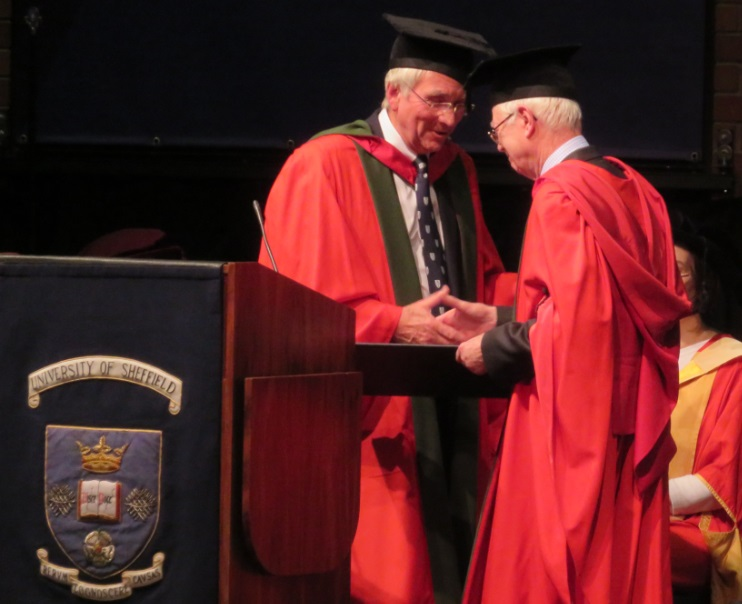
Australian medic Ian D. Cooke (right) wearing a doctoral gown at graduation ceremony

As at most universities, Sheffield graduands wear academic dress appropriate to the degree they are receiving when graduating. The hoods of all degrees are Cambridge shape [f1] (see Groves classification system). Bachelors wear a black Oxford BA [b1] gown. The hood is in green, half-lined with white fur, and edged with two inches of silk in the faculty or degree colour. Masters wear either a black Oxford MA [m1] gown (postgraduate master's degrees) or the bachelor's gown (integrated master's degrees), with a hood of green silk which is fully lined with the faculty or degree colour. The PhD and the MPhil hoods are lined in green. Research doctors have a fine scarlet cloth gown with green silk facings and bell-shaped sleeves [d2]; higher doctors wear a robe with full sleeves lined with scarlet silk and the lining held up at the elbow level with a scarlet cord and button [d1]. The hood is made of red ottoman silk. The hood for postgraduate certificates and diplomas was originally (in 1993–94) unlined green silk with the faculty colour on the border of the neckband and the cape, but by 2012 were similar to the bachelors hood but without the fur half-lining, having a broad edging of the faculty colour on the hood and a neckband of the faculty colour.

The faculty and degree colours are: arts and humanities – crushed strawberry; music (only for BMus, MMus, and DMus degrees) – cream brocade; engineering – purple; medicine and surgery – red; dental surgery – pale rose pink; health – cerise; science – apricot; social sciences – lemon yellow; international faculty – Saxon blue; board of extra-faculty provision – pale blue. Some schools at Sheffield previously had their own colours but these are no longer used. They were: metallurgy – steel grey; education – pearl; architecture – old gold; law – olive green. The faculty of social sciences previously used pale green as its faculty colour.

==== University mace ====
The university mace is an ornament of governance of the University of Sheffield. It is silver-gilt and carries the coats of arms of both the university and the city of Sheffield, and the White Rose of York. A figure of Minerva holding a wreath and palm branch on a heraldic crown adorns the top of the mace. Used for the first time in 1909, the mace is carried in academic procession as the symbol of authority, which precedes the presiding officer.

=== Branding ===
The university colours have been black and gold since its founding in 1905. These remain Sheffield's colours for sports, although the main colour used for corporate branding is violet. The university uses a modified, monochrome version of the coat of arms in violet in its logo, along with the words "University of Sheffield".

== Academic profile ==
=== Admissions ===
UCAS Admission Statistics
	2025	2024	2023	2022	2021
Applications (Note: Main scheme applications, International and UK)	46,300	43,305	43,665	40,440	39,350
Accepted	5,890	5,615	5,820	6,020	5,980
Applications/Accepted Ratio	7.9	7.7	7.5	6.7	6.6
Overall Offer Rate (%)	75.3	77.9	76.2	76.3	76.9
↳ UK only (%) (Note: UK domiciled applicants)	74.9	78.0	75.5	75.1	75.9
Average Entry Tariff	—N/a	—N/a	157	158	157
↳ Top three exams (Note: The maximum tariff score for three exams is 168: the equivalent of A*A*A* at A-Level, 777 at HL for the IB Diploma Programme, or AAA at Advanced Higher)	—N/a	—N/a	147.6	149.2	147.7

HESA Student Body Composition (2024/25)
Domicile and Ethnicity	Total
British White (Note: Not be confused solely with White British)	54%
British Ethnic Minorities (Note: Includes those who indicate that they identify as Asian, Black, Mixed Heritage, Arab or any other ethnicity except White.)	18%
International EU	2%
International Non-EU	26%
Undergraduate Widening Participation Indicators
Female	50%
Independent School	10%
Low Participation Areas (Note: Calculated from the Polar4 measure, using Quintile1, in England and Wales. Calculated from the Scottish Index of Multiple Deprivation (SIMD) measure, using SIMD20, in Scotland.)	9%

In the 2024/25 academic year, the student body consisted of 28,280 students, composed of 20,215 undergraduates and 8,065 postgraduate students. The university is consistently designated as a 'high-tariff' institution by the Department for Education, with the average undergraduate entrant to the university in recent years amassing between 147–149 UCAS Tariff points in their top three pre-university qualifications – the equivalent of AAA to A*AA at A-Level. Based on 2022/23 HESA entry standards data published in domestic league tables, which include a broad range of qualifications beyond the top three exam grades, the average student at the University of Sheffield achieved 158 points – the 26th highest in the country.

=== Libraries ===
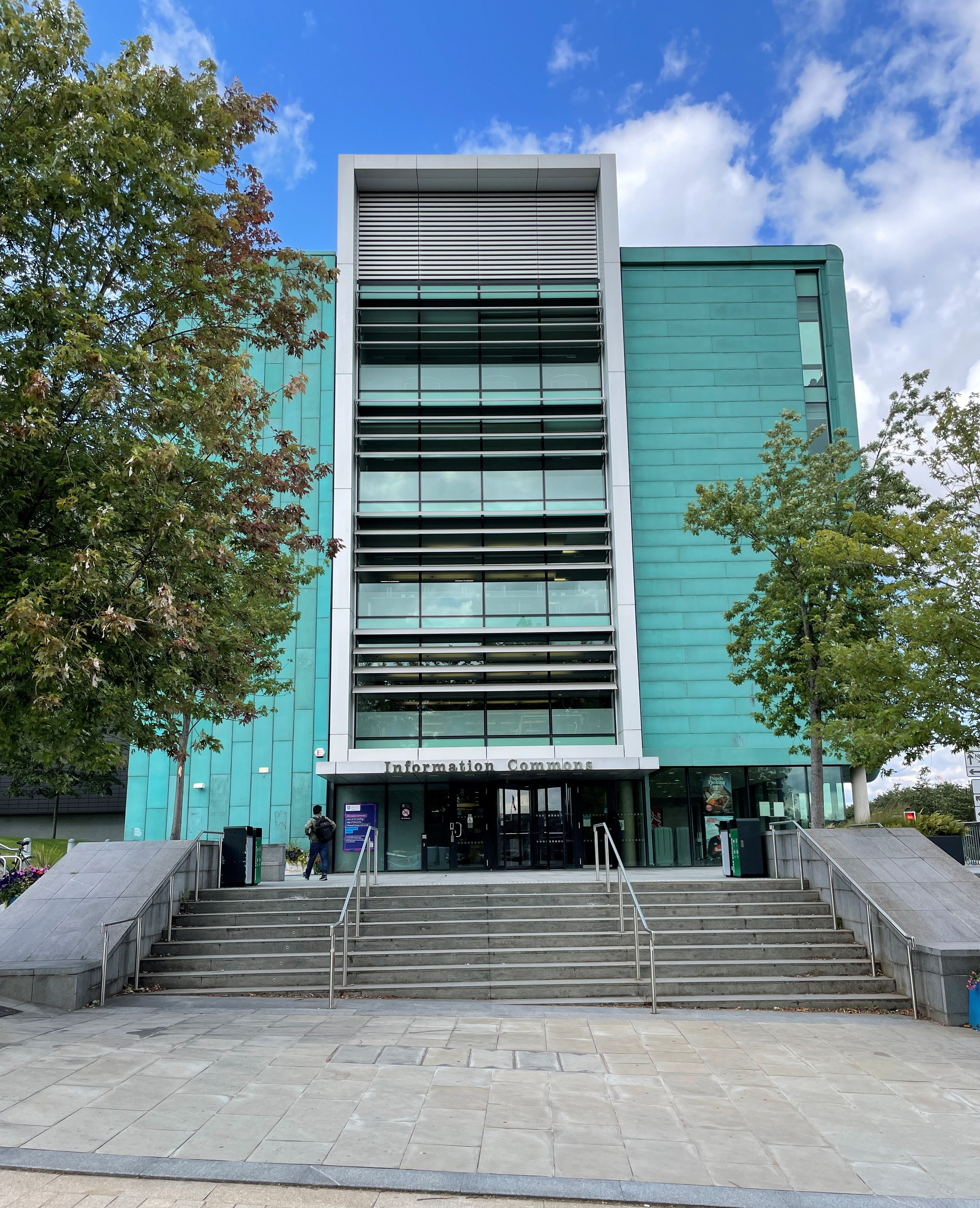
The Information Commons, viewed from Leavygreave Road

The University of Sheffield has four libraries: Western Bank Library, the Information Commons, Health Sciences Library (Royal Hallamshire Hospital), and The Diamond, holding a total of 1.5 million printed books. Western Bank Library was the university's main library until the opening of the Information Commons in 2007. The Grade II* listed library has 730 study spaces and contains 1.2 million texts for most subjects, as well as archives and special collections. The Information Commons (IC) is a 24/7 learning centre combining both library and IT services. The IC houses 120,000 core textbooks for all undergraduate and postgraduate subjects, and has approximately 1,300 study spaces and 550 PCs. The university has a medical library at the Royal Hallamshire Hospital, which opened 1978. Opened in 2018, the Diamond provides 24-hour library services (and other teaching facilities), with in-demand textbooks, a non-loanable reference collection and over 1,000 study spaces. The University of Sheffield Library is a member of Research Libraries UK.

Former libraries include the Edgar Allen Library closed by the late 1950s and St George's Library closed on 14 June 2015. The Edgar Allen Library was the first university library. In 1905 when the university was established, the library was housed in a lecture room due to lack of funds to construct a purpose-built library. William Edgar Allen, a member of the University Council, provided £10,000 to build a proper library named Edgar Allen Library, locating beside the main university building (Firth Court). Edgar Allen Library had 100 seats in its reading room, shelves for 20,000 books, and a stack space for 60,000 more books. Sir Charles Harding Firth, the first lecturer in Modern History in Firth College, donated part of his personal collection to the library. The Sheffield Town Trust also helped the university to transform the General Lecture Theatre into a reading room housing the Firth Collection (rare book collection of approximately 20,000 volumes) in 1931. As the university rapidly expanded in the 1950s, it became necessary to replace the Edgar Allen Library with a modern post-war era library. The new library, later known as the Western Bank Library, opened in 1959. Edgar Allen Library (now the Rotunda in Firth Court) became the registrar and secretary's office. St George's Library was refurbished as an exam venue.

=== Museums and collections ===
The Alfred Denny Museum is a zoology museum operated by the university. Established in 1905, the museum was located in Firth Court, spanning three floors, and in 1950 was named after the first professor of biology at Sheffield. It has specimens from all major phyla, and two letters written from Charles Darwin to Henry Denny, father of Alfred Denny. Many of the specimens have been collected since the 1900s, but much of the information about the collection was lost during the Second World War. The museum, now reduced in size, has been moved to Alfred Denny Building after the war. The museum is primarily a teaching museum but is usually open for public tours on the first Saturday of each month.

The University of Sheffield Herbarium is part of the Alfred Denny Museum. It holds a collection of around 12,000 preserved plant specimens collected in the late 19th century and early to mid 20th century. The collection is mainly from the British Isles and Europe focusing on tracheophytes, bryophytes, charophytes and fungi. Many of the micro-fungi specimens are from the collection of mycologist and Sheffield alumnus John Webster.

The Turner Museum of Glass houses the university's collections of 19th and 20th century glass. It contains items mainly from major European and American glassworkers and examples from ancient Egypt and Rome. It is in the Hadfield Building. It was founded by W. E. S. Turner of the university in 1943. One of the exhibits is the wedding dress of Helen Nairn (Turner's wife) which is made of glass fibre. This has been selected as one of the items in the BBC's A History of the World in 100 Objects.

The Western Bank Library has an exhibition gallery on the mezzanine level, allowing special collections from the university library and the National Fairground Archive to be displayed in controlled conditions. In 2010, the gallery was restored and refurbished by a grant from the Wolfson Foundation. The library usually schedules three temporary exhibitions per year, and most of the exhibitions are free to visit during library opening hours.

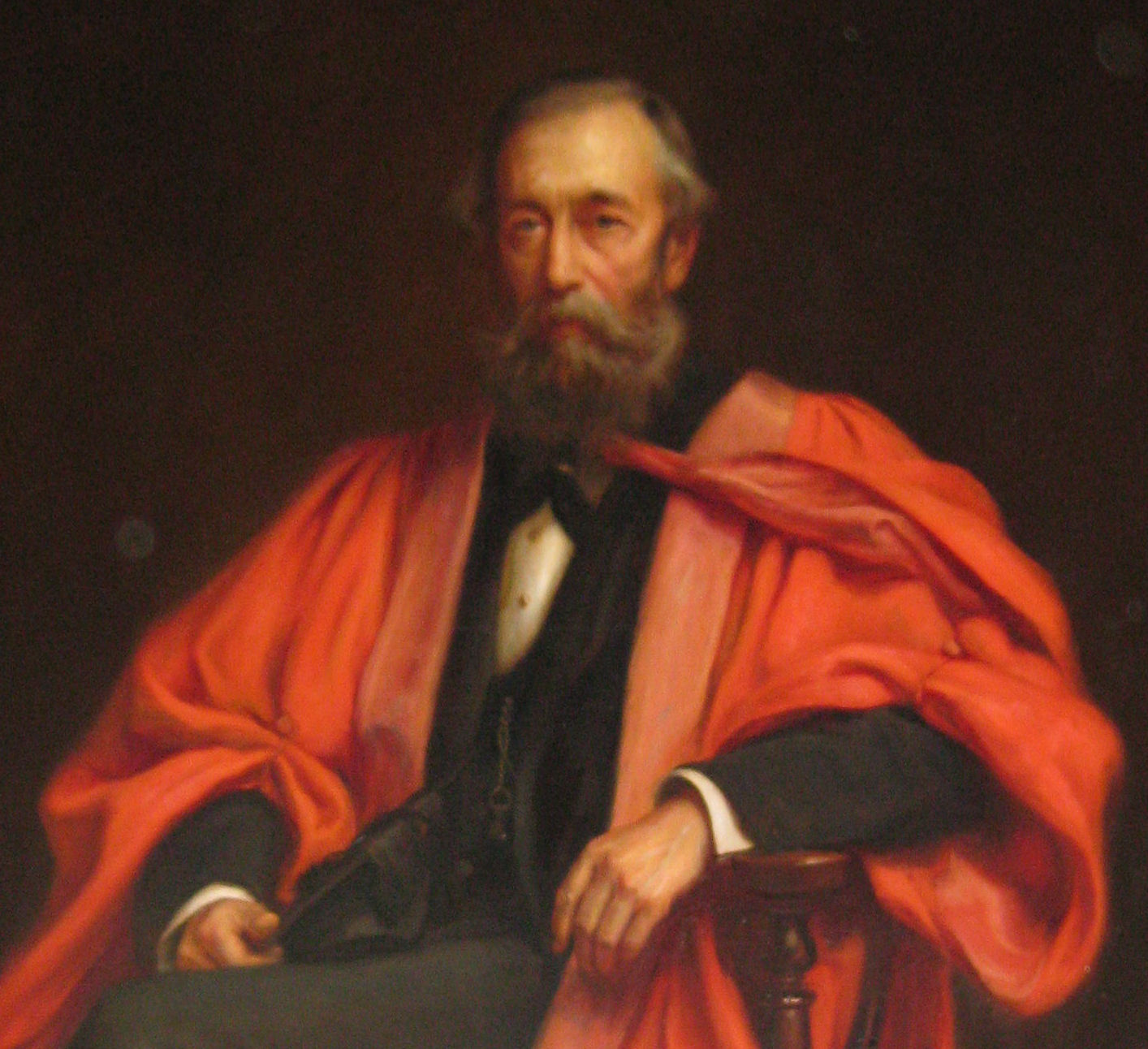
Henry Clifton Sorby donated his lantern glass slide collection to the university library

The Henry Clifton Sorby Collection contains glass lantern slides of marine organisms prepared and donated by Henry Clifton Sorby in the 1900s. Sorby was president of Firth College after the death of Mark Firth, vice-president of the University College of Sheffield, and a member of the Council of the University of Sheffield. His broad interests included marine biology, and he had developed a technique for preparing and mounting invertebrate marine animals onto slides. The specimens were cleared and stained so that enabling projection onto a screen for viewing. The glass lantern slides are now held in the Department Animal and Plant Sciences.

The National Fairground and Circus Archive (NFCA) is a living archive that collects material from the fairground, circus and the allied entertainment industries. NFCA was in 1994 developed out of the PhD research by Vanessa Toulmin, who was later director of the archive from its inception until 2016. With its own Reading Room situated in Western Bank Library, the archive holds 150,000 photographs, 4,000 books and journals, together with over 20,000 items of printed and video ephemera. Major collections include the Shufflebottom Family Collection, the John Bramwell Taylor Collection, the Malcolm Airey Collection and the John Turner Collection.

=== Research centres ===
Sheffield has 11 cross-faculty university research centres, established based on defined criteria and periodically reviewed.

The university has over 180 specialised research centres or institutes. The National Epitaxy Facility at Sheffield is leading the semiconductor research & development in collaboration with The University of Cambridge and University College London. At the £12.5 million UK Centre for Heterogeneous Integrated MicroElectronic and Semiconductor Systems (CHIMES²), Sheffield brings together researchers from the Universities of Cambridge, Oxford, Queen’s University Belfast, Strathclyde, Edinburgh, Newcastle, King’s College London, Manchester, and the Science and Technology Facilities Council (STFC) to design the next generation of advanced electronic systems and support UK Semiconductor Strategy.

=== Industrial partnership ===
The Advanced Manufacturing Research Centre (AMRC) is a network of centres and a partnership between the university and over a hundred industrial companies on the Advanced Manufacturing Park.

The University of Sheffield Innovation District was established in 2015 with the launch of AMRC's Factory 2050, designed for research into reconfigurable machining and assembly using digitally assisted robotics. In 2025, a plan was launched to develop 40 hectares (100 acres) on the site of the former Sheffield City Airport to expand the innovation district. The university also works with local small and medium enterprises through the dedicated physical spaces at the Sheffield Bioincubator and Kroto Innovation Centre.

=== Reputation and rankings ===
Rankings
National rankings
- Complete (2027): 13
- Guardian (2027): 15
- Times / Sunday Times (2027): 11

Global rankings
- ARWU (2026): 151–200
- QS (2027): 82=
- THE (2026): 108=

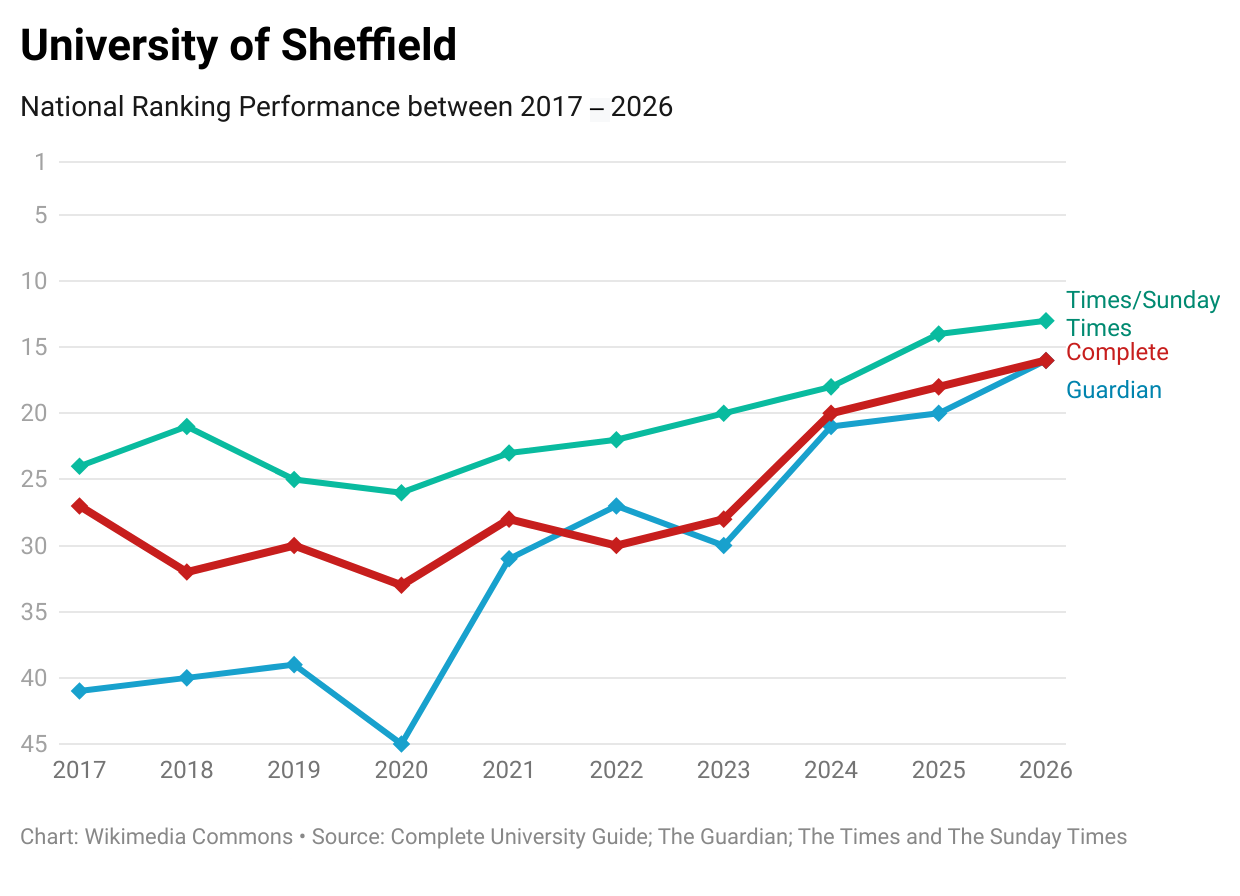
University of Sheffield's national league table performance over the past ten years

Sheffield was described by The Sunday Times in 2007 as "one of the powerhouses of British higher education". The university is a member of the Russell Group, the European University Association, the Worldwide Universities Network, the N8 Research Partnership and the White Rose University Consortium.

Sheffield has been awarded the Queen's Anniversary Prize for Higher Education five times. Sheffield was Sunday Times University of the Year in 2001 and Times Higher Education University of the Year in 2011. It was also a runner-up for The Times and Sunday Times University of the Year 2025.

In 2026, Sheffield was ranked 64th in the world's top universities ranking by Time magazine and Statista in 2026. The university was ranked 108th in the world by Times Higher Education World University Rankings and 82nd in the world by QS global ranking.

In the Times Higher Education analysis of the 2021 Research Excellence Framework Sheffield was ranked 11th for research power in the UK, moving up from 13th in REF2014, with 92% of the research submitted judged as world leading (4*) or internationally excellent (3*).

== Student life ==
=== Students' union ===
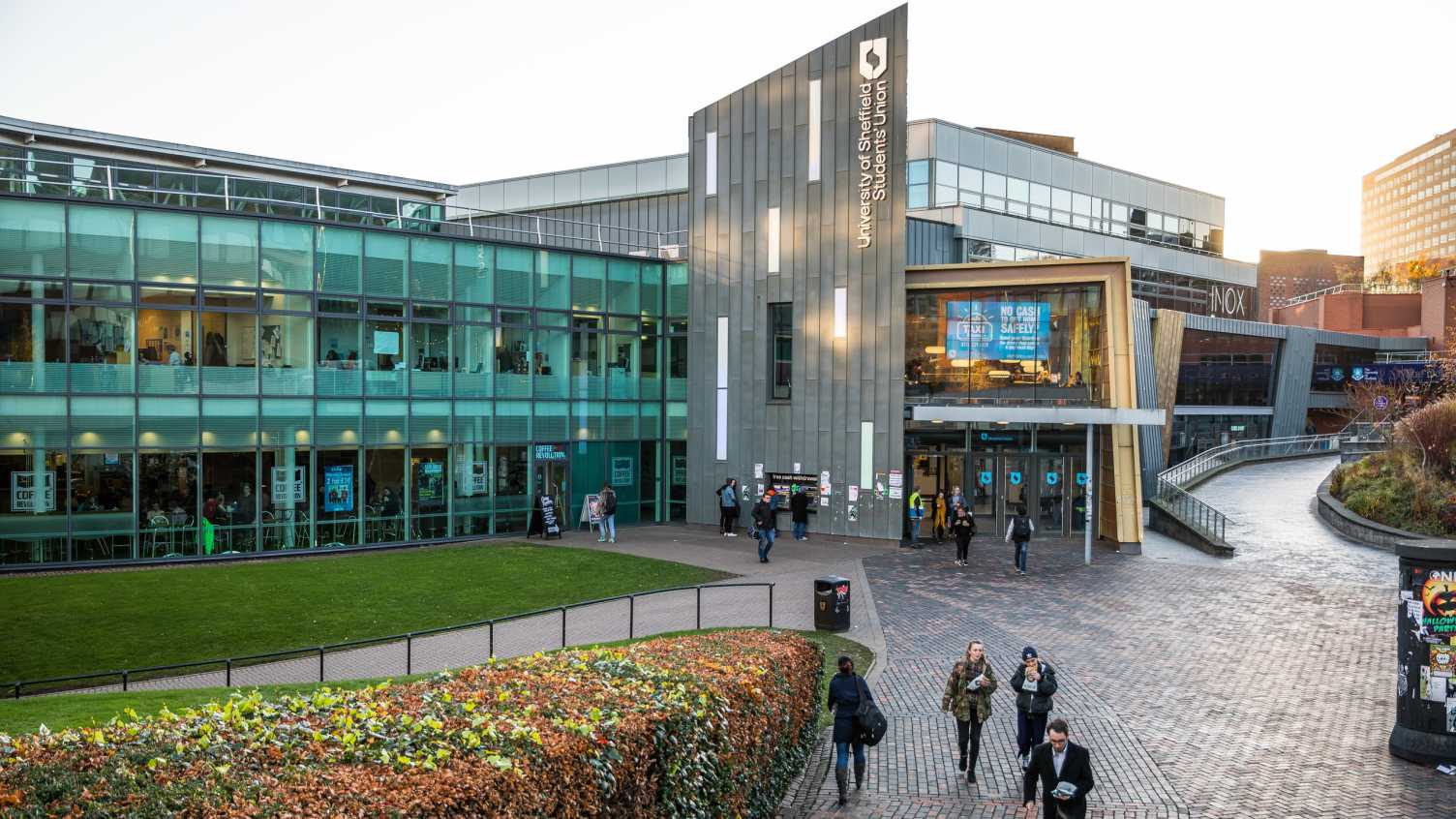
Students' Union building on Western Bank

The University of Sheffield Students' Union was founded in 1906, and has over 300 student societies and 60 sports teams. The students' union was voted best in the UK for ten consecutive years, from 2009 to 2018, by the Times Higher Education Student Experience Survey.

Sheffield University Football Club has been established for many decades and has previously competed in the FA Amateur Cup and FA Vase. The union building contains society and union workplaces and coffee shops, restaurants, shops, and the student run cinema film unit. Facilities include two bars (Bar One – which has a bookable function room with its own bar, The Raynor Lounge – and The Interval); a three-room club venue (Foundry); There is also a student radio station called Forge Radio, a TV station called Forge TV, and a newspaper called Forge Press, which are run under the umbrella of Forge Media since 2008.

In November 2009 a development project began to redevelop the students' union building, funded by £5 million by the HEFCE, which was completed and re-opened in September 2010. Works centred on improving circulation around the building by aligning previously disjointed floors, improving internal access between the union building and neighbouring University House, and constructing a new entrance and lobby that incorporates the university's traditional colours of black and gold. During the 2012–13 academic year the students' union underwent further redevelopment with a £20 million refurbishment of University House, resulting in the 1963 building being fully integrated with the students' union in a single building.

=== Sheffield Varsity ===
The annual Sheffield Varsity is an annual varsity match that takes place between sports teams from the university and its rival Sheffield Hallam University starting from 1996. The varsity is divided into winter and summer competitions. Over 1,000 students from both universities compete in over 30 varsity sports in more than 70 events. The Sheffield Varsity series is home to the largest Ice Hockey Varsity Match outside North America, as well as one of the largest collegiate ice hockey matches in the world. With an annual ice hockey match at Utilita Arena attracting over 9500 supporters. The university's sports colours are black and gold. Sheffield won the Varsity competition in 2013, beating Hallam for the first time in ten years. Since finding victory in 2013, the University has had consistent success against Sheffield Hallam, with the University winning for 11 consecutive years.

== Notable alumni ==
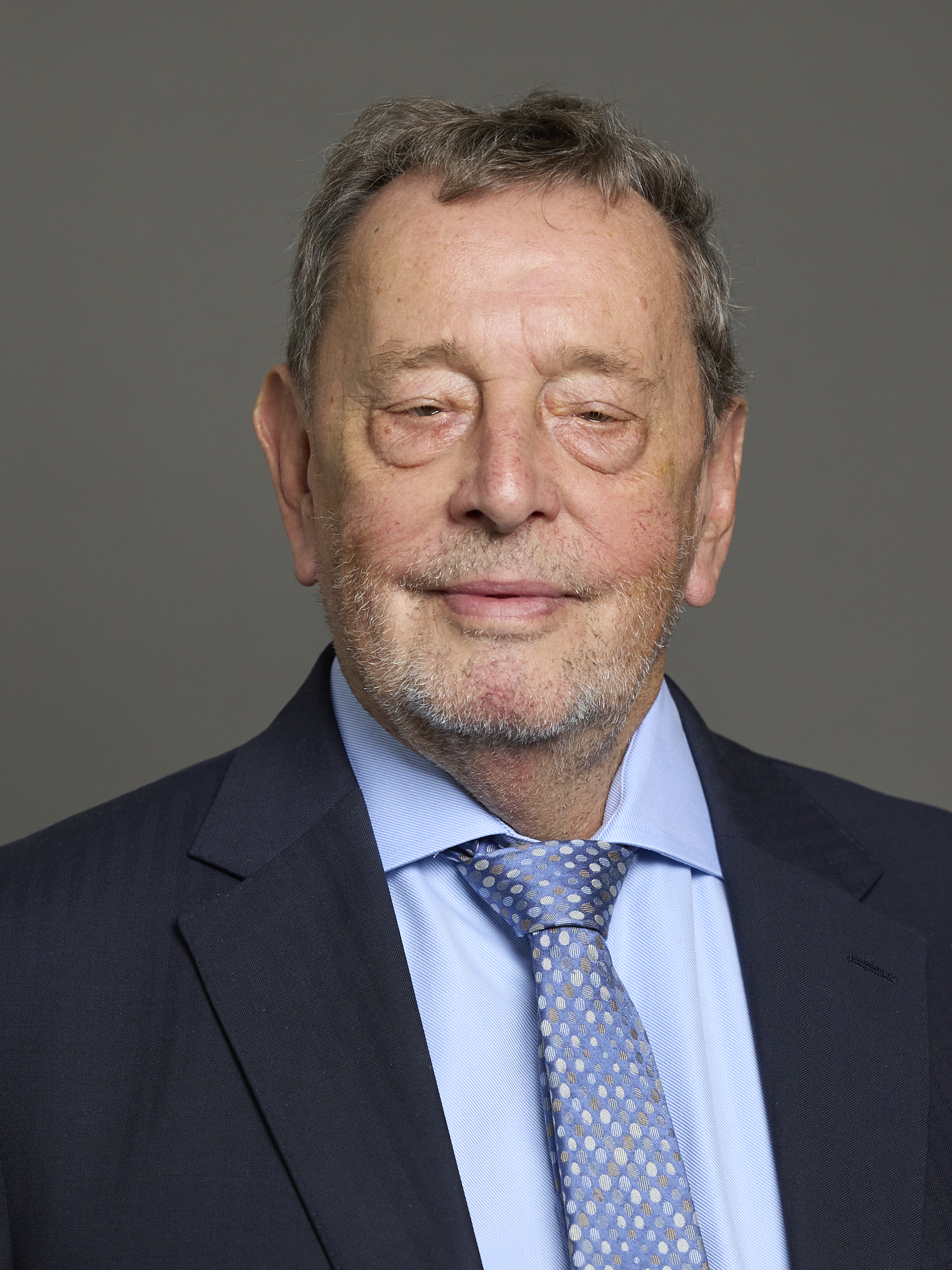
David Blunkett

Many notable people in a number of disciplines have attended Sheffield. A number of politicians are alumni of the university, including President of Dominica Nicholas Liverpool, Deputy Prime Minister of Turkey Nurettin Canikli, Home Secretary David Blunkett, Minister for Foreign Affairs of Seychelles Jean-Paul Adam, Downing Street Chief of Staff Nick Timothy. At least ten members of the UK Parliament and two members of the European Parliament have studied at Sheffield. Notable public servants who have studied at the university includes Secretary General of the Higher Commission for Industrial Security of Saudi Arabia Khalid S. Al-Ageel, Chief Economist at the Bank of England Andy Haldane, head of London Metropolitan Police Bernard Hogan-Howe, Chief of the Defence Staff Stuart Peach, Children's Commissioner for England Maggie Atkinson. and housing expert Tony Crook CBE.

Sheffield has educated a number of judges and lawyers. In 2014, the university had the highest number of alumni appointed to the bench of the Court of Appeal after Oxford and Cambridge. For a case in November 2013, the court had a bench consisting of judges who all graduated at Sheffield: Maurice Kay, Anne Rafferty and Julia Macur. The Sheffield School of Law has also produced lawyers around the world. This includes Deputy Minister of Justice of Afghanistan Mohammad Qasim Hashimzai, Chief Justice of Bangladesh Md. Muzammel Hossain, Supreme Court Justice of Sierra Leone Henry M. Joko-Smart, and Chief Justice of Malaysia Arifin Zakaria.

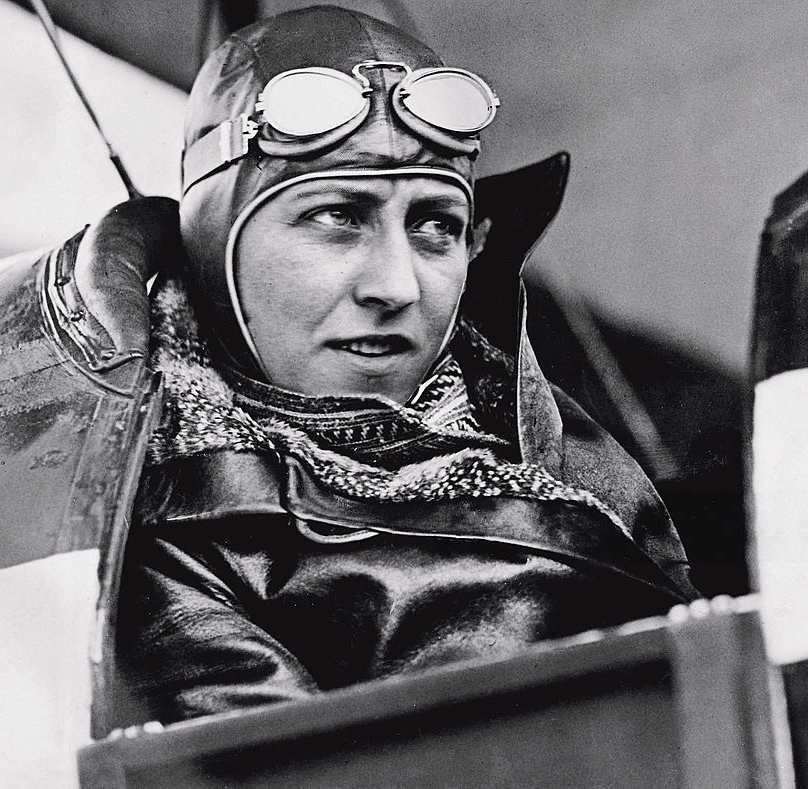
Amy Johnson

Writers who attended the university include two-times Booker Prize winner Hilary Mantel, Lee Child, Andrew Grant, Brooke Magnanti (Belle de Jour), Lindsay Ashford and Katie B. Edwards. Actors and actress Brian Glover, Ian Hallard, Rachel Shelley and Suzy Eddie Izzard were students at the university. Notable Sheffield alumni in religion includes Dean of Westminster Abbey Wesley Carr, Dean of Christ Church of Oxford Martyn Percy, General Secretary of Action of Churches Together in Scotland Stephen Smyth, and Archbishop of Sydney Glenn Davies. Many pioneers were students at the university, including first British astronaut Helen Sharman, Polar explorer Roy Koerner, and the first female pilot to fly solo from London to Australia Amy Johnson. Sheffield students have also excelled in sports. Jessica Ennis-Hill and Hollie Webb are Olympic gold medalists. Bryony Page and Nick Beighton have won medals at the Olympics and Paralympics respectively. Notable alumni in sports also include Herbert Chapman, Zara Dampney, Catherine Faux, Tim Robinson and David Wetherill.

Warburg Medal winning scientist Hans Kornberg have been studied at Sheffield, along with Olive Scott and Donald Bailey, inventor of the Bailey bridge. Sheffield's Department of Chemistry has also educated two winners of the Nobel Prize in Chemistry.

=== Nobel prizes ===
The university's Faculty of Science is associated with six Nobel laureates, two for the Department of Molecular Biology and Biotechnology:

- 1945 Nobel Prize in Physiology or Medicine (joint award) Howard Florey, for his work on penicillin
- 1953 Nobel Prize in Physiology or Medicine, Hans Adolf Krebs, "for the discovery of the citric acid cycle in cellular respiration"

And four to its Department of Chemistry:

- 1967 Nobel Prize in Chemistry (joint award), George Porter, "for their work on extremely fast chemical reactions" (see Flash photolysis)
- 1993 Nobel Prize in Physiology or Medicine (joint award), Richard J. Roberts, "for the discovery that genes in eukaryotes are not contiguous strings but contain introns, and that the splicing of messenger RNA to delete those introns can occur in different ways, yielding different proteins from the same DNA sequence"
- 1996 Nobel Prize in Chemistry (joint award), Sir Harry Kroto, "for their discovery of fullerenes"
- 2016 Nobel Prize in Chemistry (joint award), Sir James Fraser Stoddart, "for the design and synthesis of molecular machines"
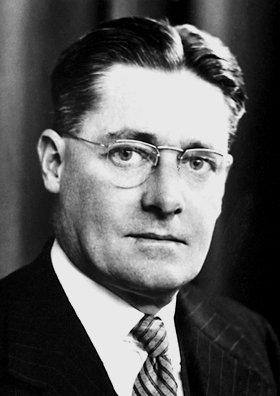
Howard Florey

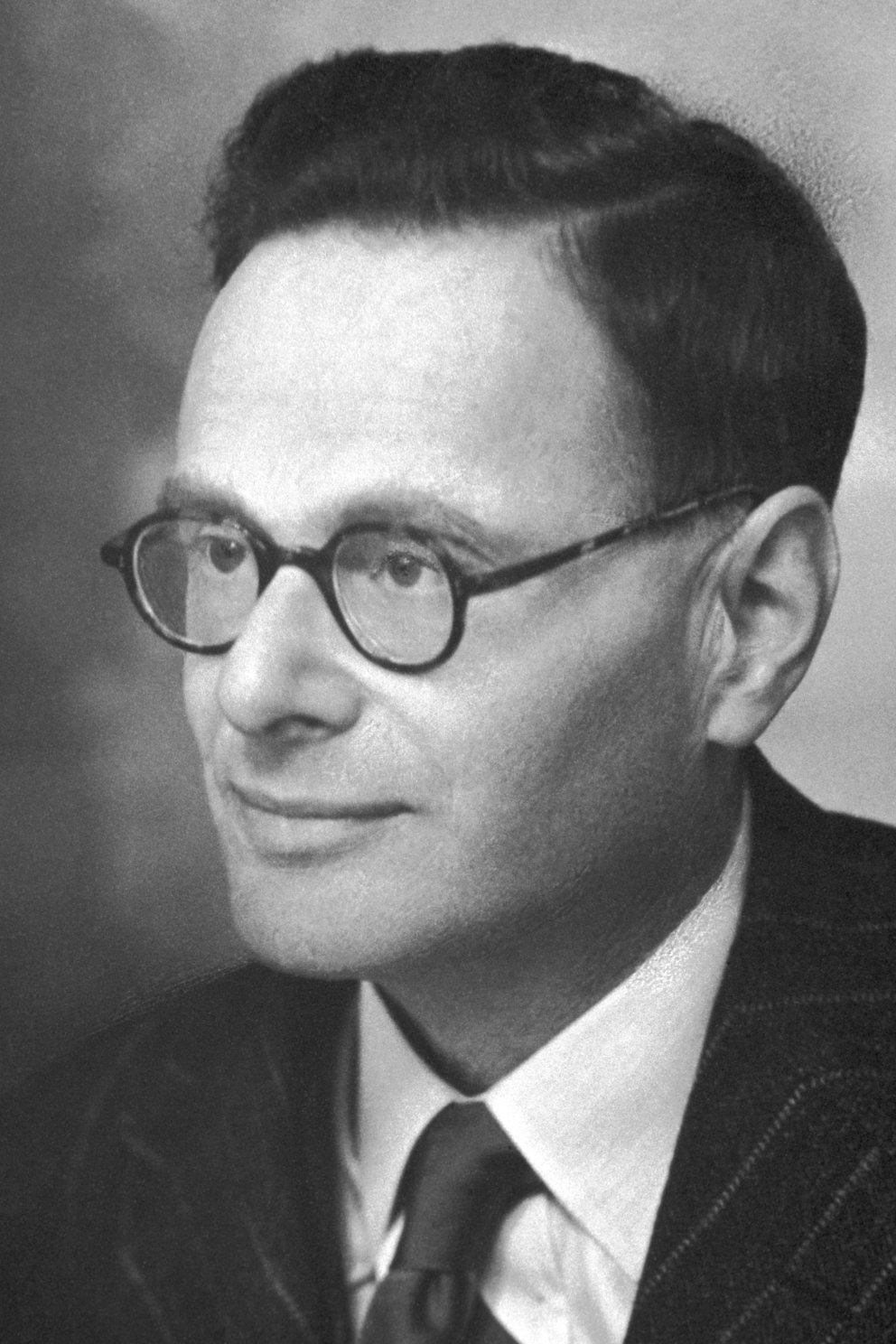
Hans Adolf Krebs

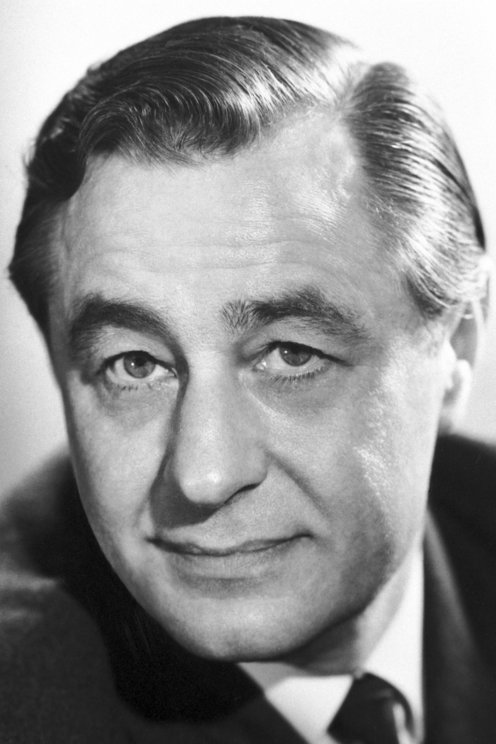
George Porter

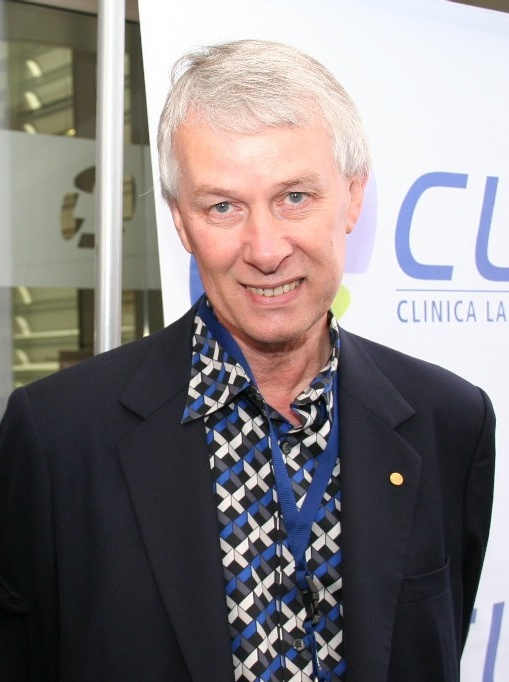
Richard Roberts

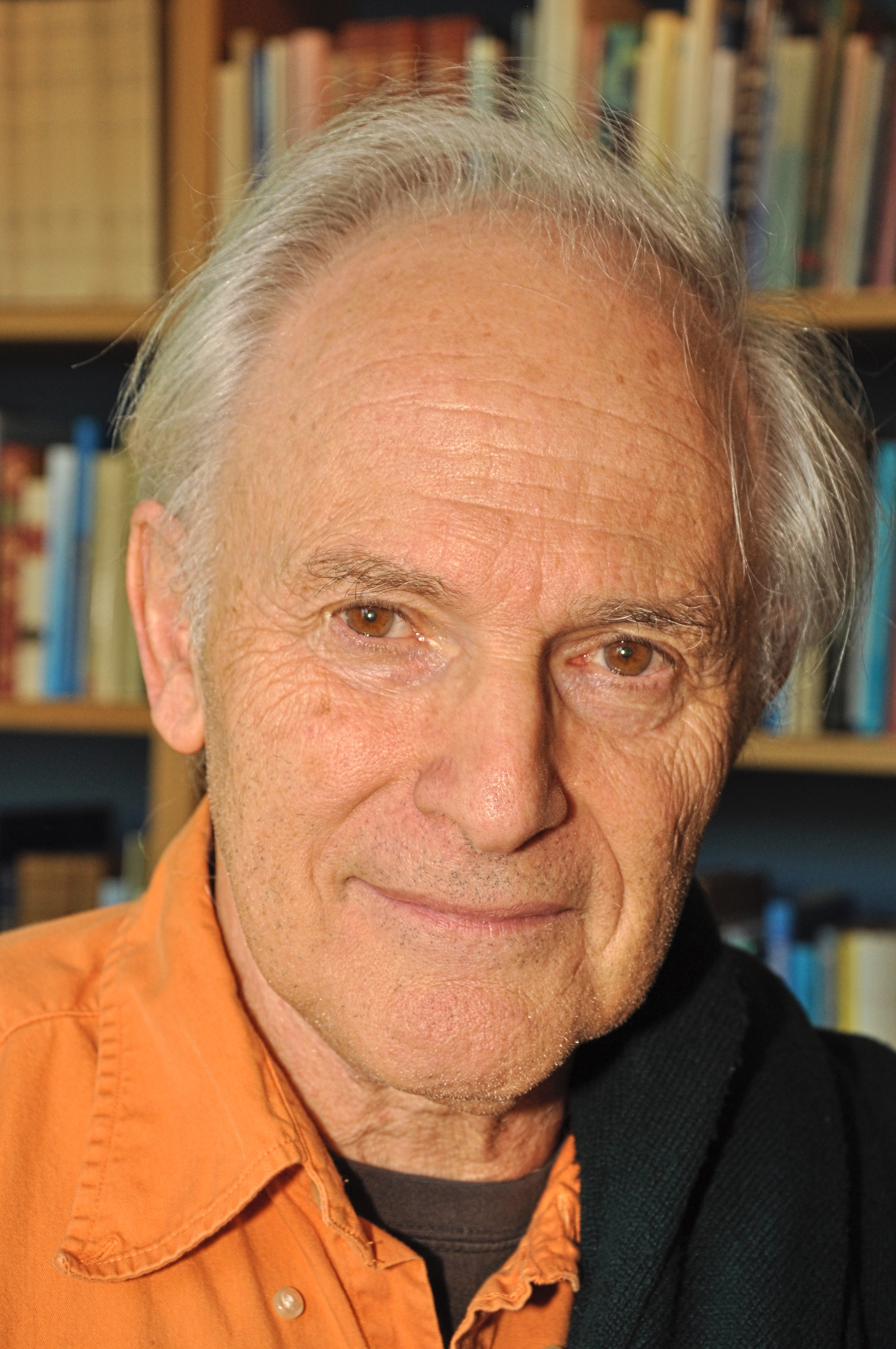
Harold Kroto

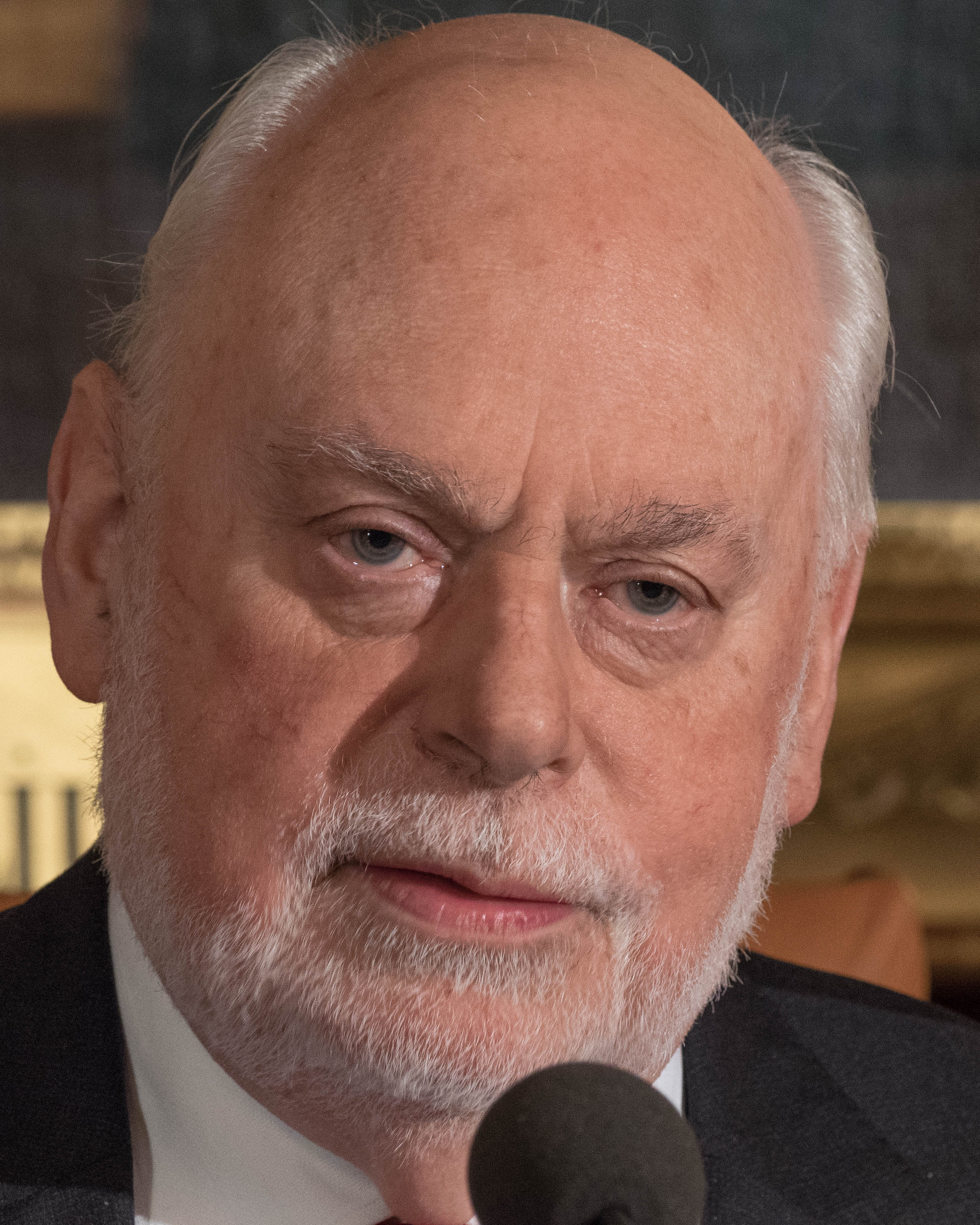
Sir James Fraser Stoddart

Two Nobel laureates associated with the university are not officially counted. They are: Sir John Vane (research worker) and Wole Soyinka (visiting professor).

== In popular culture ==
A fictionalised version of the University of Sheffield is the setting of the award-winning comic book series, Giant Days. Comedy Love in the Time of Britpop is set at the university in the 1990s Cool Britannia era. The university's Western Bank Library is featured in Barry Libin's novel Mystery of the Milton Manuscript.

== See also ==
- Armorial of British universities
- Hughes Professor of Spanish
- List of modern universities in Europe (1801–1945)
- List of universities in the United Kingdom
- Sheffield school
- Sheffield Hallam University
