= Information Commons, Sheffield =

Information Commons
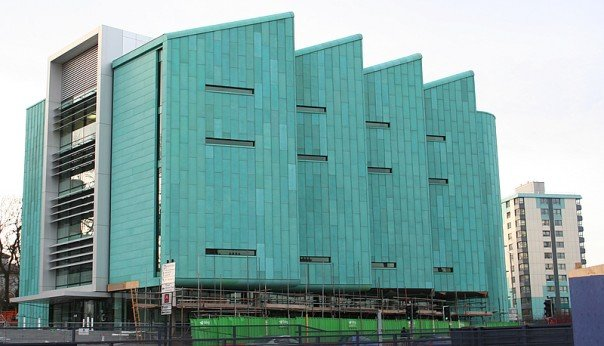
- Interactive map of the Information Commons area

General information
- Type: Education
- Location: Sheffield, England
- Coordinates: 53.38142°N 1.48445°W
- Completed: 2007

Technical details
- Floor count: 7

Other information
- Public transit: B Y University of Sheffield

The Information Commons (also known as the IC) is a library and computing building in Sheffield, England, and is part of the University of Sheffield. The architects were the Edinburgh-based RMJM. The IC is located on Leavygreave Road, close to the University of Sheffield tram stop.

It opened on 10 April 2007 to staff and students of the university, although it was officially opened on 26 September 2007 by Harsh Srivastav, a graduate of the university and former President of the Students Union. The project was conceived and is jointly operated by the University Library and the Corporate Information and Computing Services (CiCS). Soon after opening, satirical British magazine, Private Eye questioned the appropriateness of the building's name as a "commons", pointing out that ordinary residents of Sheffield, temporary staff and visiting researchers from other universities are forbidden access.

The IC has over 1,300 study spaces, 500 computers, and carries 100,000 texts. There is an information desk and a café on the ground floor, toilets and water fountains on all levels and shower facilities on the first level. The building is open to University of Sheffield staff and students 24 hours a day, 365 days a year.

On Thursday 2 February 2017, the IC hosted the University of Sheffield #1lib1ref event.

As of 2016, the Information Commons hosts the university's Digital Commons, a collaborative space to develop innovations in Digital Learning.

The Information Commons was temporary closed during the summer vacation of 2017 due to the interior refurbishment. The IC was reopened in September 2017 with alterations to interior design and layout.
