= Hedley Le Bas =

British publisher and advertising executive (1868–1926)

- Born: Hedley Francis Le Bas; May 19, 1868; Jersey
- Died: 1926 (aged 57–58)
- Occupations: Publisher, advertising executive
- Known for: "Your Country Needs You" army recruiting campaign
- Notable work: Caxton Publishing
- Spouse: Emma Mary Barnes (m. 1900)
- Children: Hedley Ernest Le Bas (1901–1942); Joan Mary Le Bas (1912–1994)
- Parent: Thomas Amice Le Bas

Hedley Francis Le Bas (1868–1926) was a British publisher and advertising executive. He is best known for the World War I recruiting campaign using the slogan "Your Country Needs You".

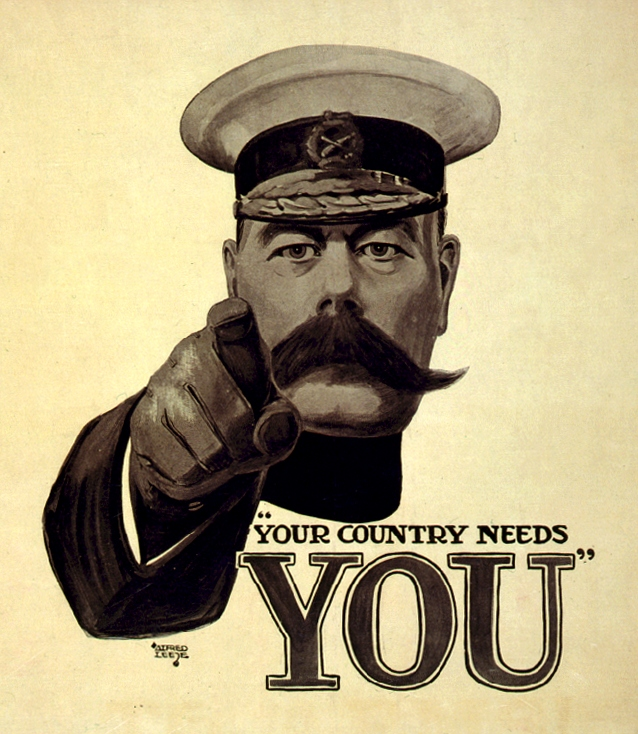
"Your Country Needs You", iconic British recruiting poster with Lord Kitchener, the campaign being the work of Hedley Le Bas

== Early life ==
He was born in Jersey on 19 May 1868, the son of ship's captain Thomas Amice Le Bas, and educated there. In early life he was a professional soldier, serving seven years in the 15th Hussars from age 18. He then went into publishing, working for Blackie in Manchester. He also became involved in advertising to promote books, with the Caxton Publishing Company and Caxton Advertising Agency, both founded in 1899.

In 1910, Le Bas bought out partners T. C. and E. C. Jack in Caxton Publishing, creating a private limited company. He went on to become a director of George Newnes, Ltd and C. Arthur Pearson, Ltd. On the board of Caxton Publishing he encountered George Riddell, who became a golfing companion and friend, for a time.

== Government work and World War I ==
The work of Le Bas on army recruitment followed an October 1913 encounter over a golf match involving George Riddell, with J. E. B. Seely, the Secretary of State for War. It was launched by the Caxton agency in January 1914, with newspaper advertisements and a recruiting film, after Caxtons had consulted with Wareham Smith (1874–1938) and Thomas Baron Russell (1865–1931), who had worked as advertising managers, respectively with the Daily Mail and The Times. Le Bas was a Liberal Party candidate, for Watford, but stepped down in July 1914 for health reasons.

On the outbreak of World War I, Le Bas was summoned by the British government, and he formed a committee of advertising men to promote recruitment. The celebrated poster of autumn 1914 was based on an image of Lord Kitchener by Alfred Leete. The poster campaign itself was in the hands of the Parliamentary Recruitment Committee. Le Bas and his colleague Eric Field from the Caxton Advertising Agency were also creative initiators in the Daddy, what did you do in the Great War? poster campaign of 1915.

In 1915, Le Bas was recommended by Lord Northcliffe to Reginald McKenna as someone to promote the first British war loan. His view was that politicians of the time had little idea how to exploit the media. During 1915 his recruiting efforts turned to Ireland, and there he drew on his army service in Waterford, exploiting the appeal of military bands in a town with a substantial munitions industry. In February of that year, he analysed for David Lloyd George the issue of Irish nationalist volunteers, and in particular the Irish Volunteers force, in the eyes of the army: taken for a Tory, he had been told they were not wanted, for the political reasons tied up with Irish Home Rule.

Also in 1915, Le Bas fell out in a very public way with Riddell. Both significant in the Liberal press, they were divided by the party faultline separating McKenna from Lloyd George, their respective golfing partners in a June 1915 match. Matters came to a head with Riddell suing Le Bas, over an alleged claim of fraud, and stating that Le Bas had tried to blackmail him over the divorce that ended his first marriage.

Le Bas was knighted in 1916, the first advertising person to be honoured in that way. He stated a conviction that "publicity will find or create anything". In that year he became the publicity officer of the National Organising Committee for War Savings (NCWS).

After Kitchener's death at sea in 1916, Le Bas organised the Lord Kitchener National Memorial Fund, and in 1917 edited the Lord Kitchener Memorial Book that raised funds for it.

== Later life ==
Le Bas brought a libel action against the Daily Mail, alleging that in articles and letters the newspaper had published, he had been accused of trying to influence the press in corrupt ways. He lost the case, in April 1919.

In the early 1920s, Le Bas was a director of the New Statesman, offering advice to make it financially viable. The editor at the time was Clifford Sharp. Le Bas discovered that the circulation was understated by a factor of nearly three, and proposed raising the advertising rate.

In 1921, Le Bas founded, with friends, the Lucifer Golfing Society, a gentleman's club that still exists; the story runs that the proposed name was the Match Club, but such a club already existed, and a pun ("lucifer" for match, as well as a euphemism for the Devil) was incorporated in the title. He was further involved in the Lord Kitchener National Memorial Fund, founding in 1922 an association of former Kitchener Scholars.

In 1923, Le Bas's residence was given as Great Tylers, Reigate. At the end of his life, he lived at Chussex, Walton Heath, a 1908 house designed by Edwin Lutyens. In 1925, he was taking a further interest in the New Statesman, working to buy up shares in it on behalf of Ramsay MacDonald who was seeking control. He died in 1926, aged 57 or 58.

== Family ==
Le Bas married in 1900 Emma Mary Barnes, daughter of Joseph Barnes of Dorchester. They had a son Hedley Ernest (1901–1942), and a daughter Joan Mary (1912–1994).
