= Firth (surname) =

Firth is a surname. Notable people with the surname include:

- Anna Firth (elected 2022), British politician
- Barbara Firth (1928–2013), British illustrator
- Brad Firth (born c. 1971), Gwichʼin Canadian long-distance runner
- Cecil Mallaby Firth (1878–1931), English archaeologist
- Charles Firth (comedian), Australian comedian
- Charles Firth (coach), former head coach
- Charles Harding Firth (1857–1936), British historian
- Colin Firth (born 1960), British actor
- David Firth (born 1983), British animator
- Edith Firth (1927–2005), Canadian historian and librarian
- Everett Firth (1930–2015), American musician and businessman
- Harry Firth (1918–2014), Australian racing driver and race team manager
- Henry Firth (1888–1918), British conscientious objector
- Jack Firth (1917–1981), English cricketer
- John Rupert Firth (1890–1960), British linguist
- John Firth (1900–1957), British cricketer
- John C. B. Firth (1894–1931), British flying ace
- Jonathan Firth (born 1967), British actor
- Joseph Firth (1859–1931), New Zealand educator
- Josiah Firth (1826–1897), New Zealand farmer, businessman and politician
- Julian Firth (born 1960) British actor
- Malaika Firth (born 1994), British–Kenyan model
- Mark Firth (1819–1880), British steel magnate
- Matilda Firth (born 2014), English actress
- Nicholas Firth, British businessman
- Peter Firth (born 1953), British actor
- Peter Firth (bishop) (1929–2024), English Anglican bishop
- Robert Hammill Firth (1857–1931), British Army surgeon and professor of military hygiene
- Roy Firth (born c. 1934), rugby league footballer
- Scott Firth, British musician and producer
- Scott Firth (soccer) (born 2001), Canadian soccer player
- Shirley Firth (1953–2013), Canadian cross-country skier
- Raymond Firth (1901–2002), New Zealand anthropologist
- Vic Firth (1930–2015), American percussionist, founder of Vic Firth Company
- Will Firth (born 1965), Australian literary translator
