= Henry Firth =

British conscientious objector (1888–1918)

Henry William Firth (1888 – 6 February 1918) was a British conscientious objector during the First World War. He was a shoemaker and Methodist preacher who objected to serving in the war on account of his faith. Firth served a term of imprisonment in HM Prison Wormwood Scrubs after refusing to be conscripted into the British Army. After his release he was arrested and imprisoned a second time at HM Prison Maidstone. When he fell ill he agreed to carry out alternative war work so that he could leave the prison.

Firth was sent to the conscientious prisoner camp on Dartmoor where he worked in the quarry. He complained of the cold conditions and displayed symptoms of diabetes but was initially refused treatment. Firth was eventually admitted to the camp's hospital but died within days. More than 500 of the conscientious objectors in the camp went on strike because of the treatment of Firth and his case was discussed in the House of Commons.

== Early life and imprisonment ==
Henry Firth was born in 1888, the eldest son of a bootmaker. The family was poor and Firth left school early to work in the shoe industry in Norwich. He also became a Primitive Methodist local preacher. During the First World War, in 1916 conscription was implemented in Great Britain. Firth refused to serve in the armed forces, on account of his faith, and was arrested under the terms of the Military Service Act 1916. A Military Service Tribunal refused to grant him exempted status and he was sentenced to a term of imprisonment, which he served at HM Prison Wormwood Scrubs in West London. Upon his release, he was arrested a second time for refusing to enlist and imprisoned at HM Prison Maidstone. After a combined nine months in prison, Firth fell ill and was persuaded to accept alternative war employment. He was released from prison and sent to the conscientious prisoner camp on Dartmoor.

== At Dartmoor camp ==
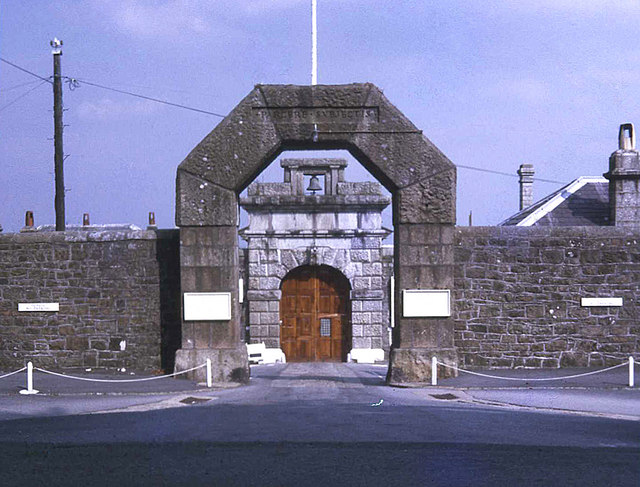
The gate to the Dartmoor camp, pictured in 1971

Firth arrived at the camp, located near to Princetown, Devon, on 31 December 1917. He was immediately put to work in the camp's quarry without receiving a medical examination. A fellow conscientious objector at the camp described Firth as "broken in health both physically and mentally by long imprisonment" and noted that he struggled to work in the extreme cold of winter on the moor. It was around this time that Firth first suffered the symptoms of diabetes. In later testimony in the House of Commons, Liberal member of parliament J. Howard Whitehouse stated that Firth had complained to Dartmoor's chief medical officer, Dr Battiscombe, of feeling cold. The only treatment received was that he was granted permission to wear an overcoat. A fellow conscientious objector noted that Firth was refused admission to the camp's hospital on the grounds that he was suspected of malingering.

On 23 and 24 January 1918 Firth was assigned the overnight work details of white washing. He returned to duty in the quarry on 28 January and, deteriorating, was finally admitted to hospital on 30 January. Firth was permitted to write to his wife, Ethel, whom he had not seen for around a year. The only medical treatment that Firth was initially prescribed was cod liver oil. A request from fellow conscientious objectors that he be allowed to eat eggs was refused on the grounds that eggs were needed for soldiers fighting on the Western Front. Intervention by a committee of conscientious objectors led to him being put onto a milk diet. Despite this Firth died in the camp hospital on 6 February 1918.

== Aftermath of death ==
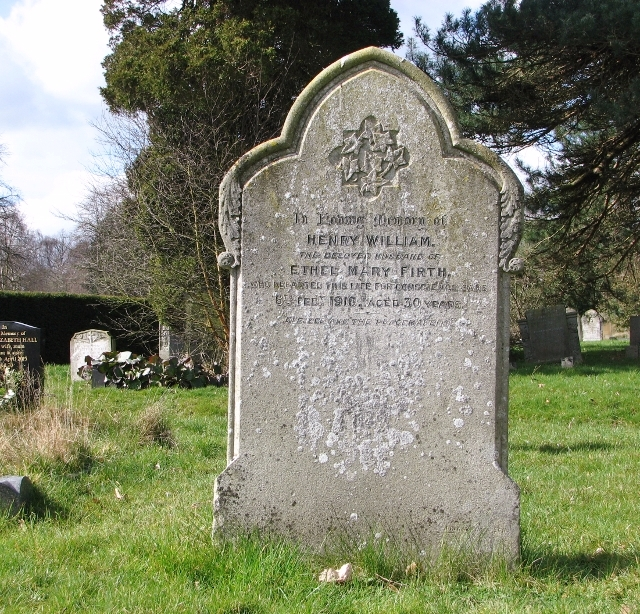
The grave of Henry William Firth "who departed this life for conscience sake" in Earlham Road Cemetery, Norwich

Firth's wife arrived at the camp on 7 February and his body was carried from the camp to Princetown railway station the following day. More than 500 conscientious objectors scheduled to work that day withdrew their labour in protest at the treatment of Firth and to accompany the procession to the station. Firth's body was carried by a group of conscientious objectors from Norwich and the assembled crowd, up to 1,000 in number, sang the hymns "Lead, Kindly Light" and "Abide With Me". As the train left it received a salute from railway detonators arranged by the conscientious objectors from Dartmoor camp. The strike, which advocated for better treatment of conscientious objectors in hospitals and prisons across the country, lasted from 6 am to 7 pm. The participants were confined to camp until 22 February and its leader C. H. Norman was sentenced to imprisonment with hard labour for one year.

An inquest was held into Firth's death at which Battiscombe and the other camp doctor affirmed that they had given all care possible. A verdict of death by natural causes, of pneumonia, was returned. Firth's death led to questions in the House of Commons as to whether he had been physically fit to carry out the work assigned to him. Joseph King MP said in the house on 21 February 1918, that "when he went to Dartmoor he was in an enfeebled condition, but set to work in a quarry, punished for not working hard and only sent to hospital when past recovery". Home Secretary Sir George Cave responded that Firth had been passed fit for work by the camp medical officer and assigned to light duties. The only other death of a conscientious objector at the Dartmoor camp during the war was Henry Haston, who died of pneumonia resulting from Spanish flu on 28 October 1918.
