= Thomas Firth =

Thomas Firth may refer to:

- Thomas Firth & Sons
- Sir Thomas Freeman Firth, 1st Baronet (1825–1909), of the Firth baronets

== See also ==
- Firth (surname)
