= Military service tribunals =

British Army administrative bodies in World War I

Military service tribunals were bodies formed by borough, urban district and rural district councils to hear applications for exemption from conscription into the British Army during the First World War. Although not strictly recruiting bodies, they played an important part in the process of conscription. Tribunals were published as part of the Derby Scheme in 1915, but were continued on a statutory basis by the Military Service Act 1916, which brought in conscription.

There were 2,086 local military service tribunals, with 83 county appeal tribunals (formed by county councils) to hear appeals by applicants not happy with the local tribunal decision. A Central Tribunal at Westminster in London served, solely at the discretion of the Appeals Tribunal, as the final court of appeal; it largely dealt with difficult cases that would stand as precedent for local tribunals.

Although they are best known for their often heavy-handed attitude towards cases of conscientious objection, most of the tribunals' work dealt with domestic and business matters. Men could apply on the grounds of their doing work of national importance, business or domestic hardship, medical unfitness, or conscientious objection. Only around two per cent of applicants were conscientious objectors. After the war, conscience cases became more prominent and tribunals are known for their (genuinely) harsh treatment of objectors.

A very large number of men applied: by the end of June 1916, 748,587 men had applied to tribunals. Over the same period around 770,000 men joined the army. Most men were given some kind of exemption, usually temporary (between a few weeks and six months) or conditional on their situation at work or home remaining serious enough to warrant their retention at home. In October 1.12 million men nationally held tribunal exemption or had cases pending, by May 1917 this had fallen to 780,000 exempt and 110,000 pending. At this point there were also 1.8 million men with exemptions granted by the government (for example, those working in war industries); combined these exemptions covered more men than were serving overseas with the British Army. Some men were exempted on the condition that they joined the Volunteer Training Corps for part-time training and home defence duties; by February 1918, 101,000 men had been directed to the Corps by the tribunals.
