= Monthly recruiting figures for the British Army in the First World War =

This is a table of the number of recruits for the British Army during the First World War, 1914–1918.

All recruits were volunteers until January 1916, when men were recruited under the Derby Scheme and as conscripts following the Military Service Act 1916. From July 1917, all recruits were counted as Conscripts.

Month	Volunteers	Conscripts & Attested	Total
August 1914	298,923	0	298,923
September 1914	462,901	0	462,901
October 1914	136,811	0	136,811
November 1914	169,862	0	169,862
December 1914	117,860	0	117,860
January 1915	156,290	0	156,290
February 1915	87,896	0	87,896
March 1915	113,907	0	113,907
April 1915	119,087	0	119,087
May 1915	135,263	0	135,263
June 1915	114,679	0	114,679
July 1915	95,413	0	95,413
August 1915	95,980	0	95,980
September 1915	71,617	0	71,617
October 1915	113,285	0	113,285
November 1915	121,793	0	121,793
December 1915	55,152	0	55,152
January 1916	49,411	16,554	65,965
February 1916	18,738	79,891	98,629
March 1916	15,876	113,617	129,493
April 1916	15,119	91,789	106,908
May 1916	31,013	94,755	125,768
June 1916	21,109	135,277	156,386
July 1916	8,611	79,602	88,213
August 1916	8,157	103,614	111,771
September 1916	5,454	65,741	71,195
October 1916	4,906	92,778	97,684
November 1916	3,060	72,998	76,058
December 1916	3,308	48,697	52,005
January 1917	4,652	81,017	85,669
February 1917	4,181	114,060	118,241
March 1917	3,130	116,409	119,539
April 1917	3,125	83,907	87,032
May 1917	4,322	84,172	88,494
June 1917	4,258	77,456	81,714
July 1917	0	60,367	60,367
August 1917	0	49,354	49,354
September 1917	0	37,342	37,342
October 1917	0	36,543	36,543
November 1917	0	30,823	30,823
December 1917	0	24,928	24,923
January 1918	0	35,150	35,150
February 1918	0	33,722	33,722
March 1918	0	30,197	30,197
April 1918	0	78,298	78,298
May 1918	0	84,019	84,019
June 1918	0	88,950	88,950
July 1918	0	59,360	59,360
August 1918	0	29,918	29,918
September 1918	0	22,550	22,550
October 1918	0	23,768	23,768
Totals	2,675,149	2,277,623	4,952,767

== Sources ==
- Army Council (1921). General Annual Reports on the British Army (including the Territorial Force) for the Period from 1st October, 1913, to 30th September, 1919. Parliamentary Paper 1921, XX, Cmd.1193. Parliament United Kingdom.
- Statistics of the Military Effort of the British Empire during the Great War. 1914–1920. London: His Majesty's Stationery Office. 1922.
