= George Riddell, 1st Baron Riddell =

British lawyer, newspaper proprietor and public servant (1865–1934)

The Right Honourable The Lord Riddell
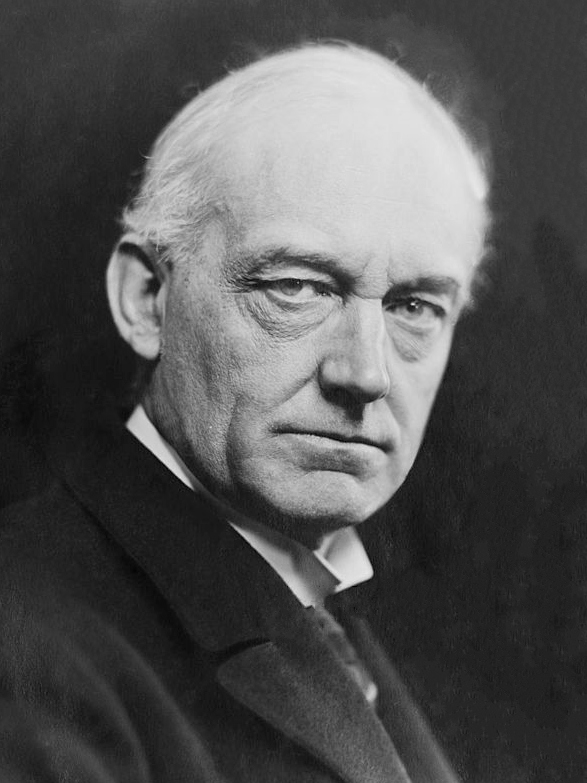
- Riddell, c. 1930
- Born: George Allardice Riddell; 25 May 1865; Brixton, London, England
- Died: 5 December 1934 (aged 69)
- Occupations: Solicitor, newspaper proprietor, public servant

George Allardice Riddell, 1st Baron Riddell (25 May 1865 – 5 December 1934), known as Sir George Riddell, Bt, between 1918 and 1920, was a British solicitor, newspaper proprietor and public servant.

== Background and education ==
Riddell was born on 25 May 1865, at 2 Stanhope Place, Loughborough Road, Brixton, London, the son of James Riddell, a photographer, and Isabel (née Young). He was educated privately, became a clerk in a solicitor's office, and qualified as a solicitor himself in 1888, taking top place in his final exams.

== Career ==
After making a fortune Riddell left the law and went into the newspaper business. By 1903 he was managing director of the News of the World and also owned other newspapers. A close friend and ally of David Lloyd George, he was knighted in 1909, on the recommendation of H. H. Asquith. During the First World War, he liaised between the government and the press and represented the British press barons at the Paris Peace Conference and later peace conferences. For these services he was created a baronet, of Walton Heath in the County of Surrey, in 1918 and raised to the peerage as Baron Riddell, of Walton Heath in the County of Surrey, in the 1920 New Year Honours. The appointment almost foundered—he had been secretly divorced in 1900 and that would have disqualified him in the king's view.

Riddell was the author of several books, among them Some Things that Matter (1922), Lord Riddell's War Diary, 1914–1918, and Lord Riddell's Intimate Diary of the Peace Conference and After. The professor of history at Brock University, John M. McEwen, considered the War Diary to be the most historically valuable of the three. In the published versions Riddell omitted much sensitive information and in February 1935 the original diaries were deposited in the British Museum "to be reserved from the Public use for fifty years". In 1986, these were edited by McEwen, who included unpublished material that shed new light on political events. A survey of 100 books on this era of British history discovered that nine-tenths of them contained references to Riddell, with the majority quoting from his published works.

He was not impressed by his contemporary, Winston Churchill. On the other hand, he was a close confidant and financial supporter of David Lloyd George from 1908 to 1922. His perceptive diary led John Grigg to say he was "the nearest equivalent to a Boswell in Lloyd George's life". In the summer of 1917, during Lloyd George's first year as prime minister, Riddell assessed his personality:

His energy, capacity for work, and power of recuperation are remarkable. He has an extraordinary memory, imagination, and the art of getting at the root of a matter....He is not afraid of responsibility, and has no respect for tradition or convention. He is always ready to examine, scrap or revise established theories and practices. These qualities give him unlimited confidence in himself.... He is one of the craftiest of men, and his extraordinary charm of manner not only wins him friends, but does much to soften the asperities of his opponents and enemies. He is full of humour and a born actor....He has an instinctive power of divining the thoughts and intentions of people with whom he is conversing. His chief defects are: (1) Lack of appreciation of existing institutions, organisations, and stolid, dull people...their ways are not his ways and their methods are not his methods. (2) Fondness for a grandiose scheme in preference to an attempt to improve existing machinery. (3) Disregard of difficulties in carrying out big projects...he is not a man of detail.

In 1905, Riddell and two associates took control of Walton Heath Golf Club, which he would control until his death. Riddell brought the News of the World Matchplay Championship to the club, which had been launched in 1903 at Sunningdale. Walton Heath would be the host course for the championship 21 times.

Riddell was chairman of the committee that built and opened London's first public golf courses in Richmond Park, which were opened in 1923 and 1925. He served as president of Fulwell Golf Club in 1923.

== Personal life ==
Riddell was twice married:

1. Firstly, to Grace Edith Williams in 1888, marriage ended in divorce in 1900.
2. Secondly to his cousin Annie Molison Allardice, in 1900.

Riddell kept his divorce secret, until the publisher Sir Hedley Le Bas revealed it in 1915. At the time the social stigma attached to his divorce, where legally he was the guilty party, would have ruled out his elevation to the peerage in 1920. Lloyd George insisted, with press magnates, against the king's wishes. The award of the barony broke through a significant parliamentary convention.

Riddell died on 5 December 1934, aged 69. He was childless, and his baronetcy and barony became extinct.

== Footnotes ==
Peerage of the United Kingdom
New creation	Baron Riddell; 1920–1934	Extinct
Baronetage of the United Kingdom
New creation	Baronet (of Walton Heath); 1918–1934	Extinct
