= Firth (disambiguation) =

Firth is a Scottish word for a coastal water body. It may also refer to:

== Places ==
Canada

- Firth River, a major river in Yukon, Canada

England

- Firth Park (ward), an electoral ward in the City of Sheffield

Scotland

- Firth, Orkney
- Firth, Shetland

United States

- Firth, Idaho, United States
- Firth, Nebraska, United States

== Other uses ==
- Firth (surname)
- Vic Firth Company, American percussion instrument manufacturing company
- Firth, Pond & Company, American music company
- "Firth of Fifth", song by British rock band Genesis, the title being a pun on the Firth of Forth in Scotland

== See also ==
- Frith
