= Lord Kitchener Wants You =

1914 British military recruitment poster

- The London Opinion published poster: "Britons: Lord Kitchener Wants You. Join Your Country's Army! God save the King." Modern reproduction from IWM
- Language: English
- Media: Watercolour; print
- Release date: 1914
- Country: United Kingdom

Lord Kitchener Wants You is a 1914 advertisement by Alfred Leete which was developed into a recruitment poster. It depicted Lord Kitchener, the British Secretary of State for War, above the words "WANTS YOU". Kitchener, wearing the cap of a British field marshal, stares and points at the viewer calling them to enlist in the British Army against the Central Powers. The image is considered one of the most iconic and enduring images of World War I. A hugely influential image and slogan, it has inspired imitations in other countries.

== Development ==
British policy for a century had been that recruitment to the British armed forces was strictly volunteer. Before the outbreak of the First World War, recruiting posters had not been used in Britain on a regular basis since the Napoleonic Wars. UK government advertisements for contract work were handled by His Majesty's Stationery Office, who passed this task on to the publishers R. F. White & Sons in order to avoid paying the government rate to newspaper publishers. As war loomed in late 1913, the number of advertising contracts expanded to include other firms. J. E. B. Seely, then the Secretary of State for War, awarded Hedley Le Bas, Eric Field, and their Caxton Advertising Agency a contract to advertise for recruits in the major UK newspapers. Eric Field designed a prototype full-page advertisement with the coat of arms of King George V and the phrase "Your King and Country Need You". Britain declared war on the German Empire on 4 August 1914 and the first run of the full-page advert ran the next day in those newspapers owned by Lord Northcliffe.

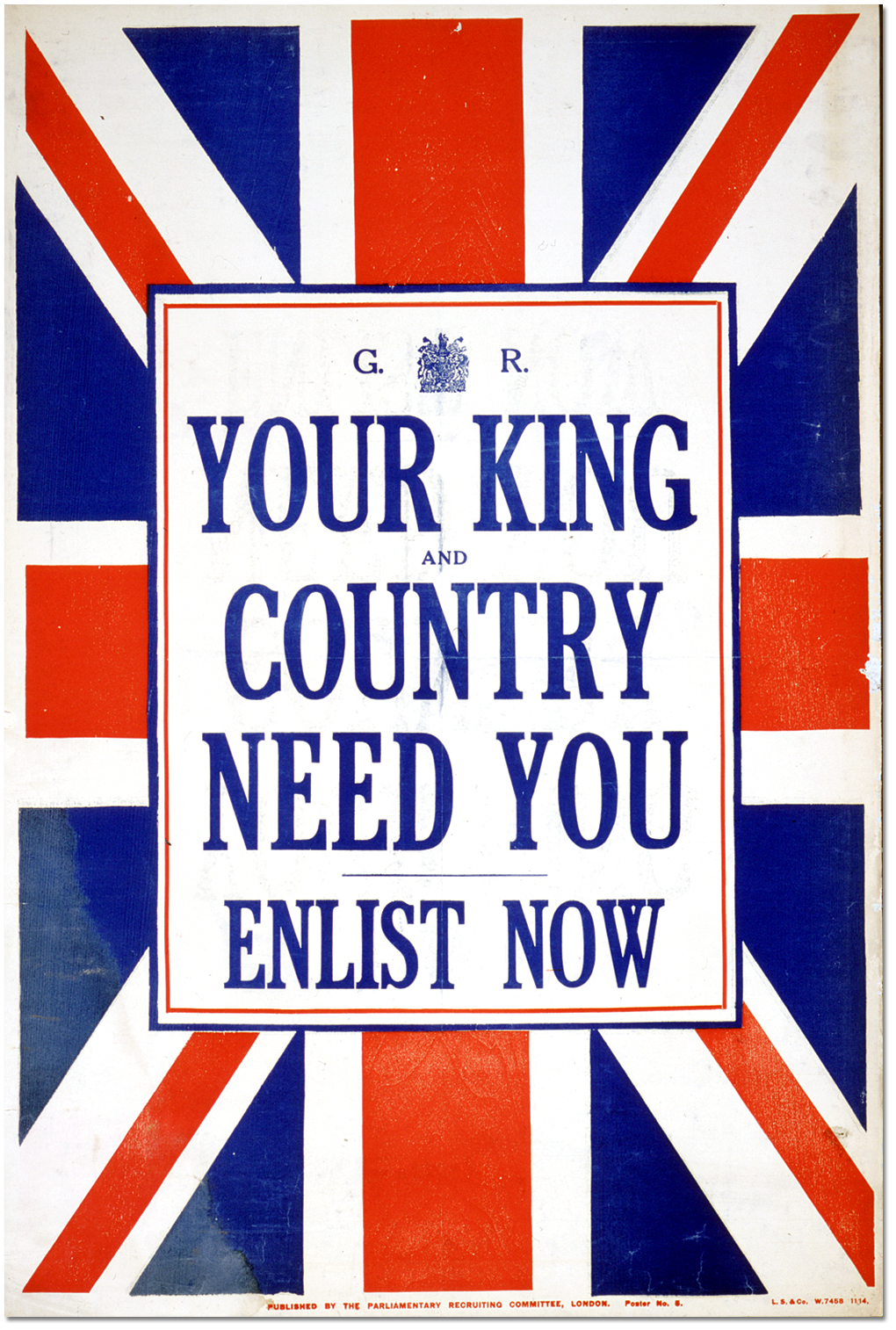
Eric Field's original design that caught the attention of Lord Kitchener

The Prime Minister H. H. Asquith appointed Kitchener as Secretary of State for War in August 1914. Kitchener was the first currently serving soldier to hold the post and was given the task of recruiting a large army to fight Germany. Unlike some of his contemporaries who expected a short conflict, Kitchener foresaw a much longer war requiring hundreds of thousands of enlistees. According to Gary S. Messinger, Kitchener reacted well to Field's advertisement, although he insisted "that the ads should all end with 'God Save the King' and that they should not be changed from the original text, except to say 'Lord Kitchener needs YOU'". In the following months, Le Bas formed an advisory committee of ad men to develop further newspaper recruiting advertisements, most of which ran vertically 11 in (28 cm), two columns wide.

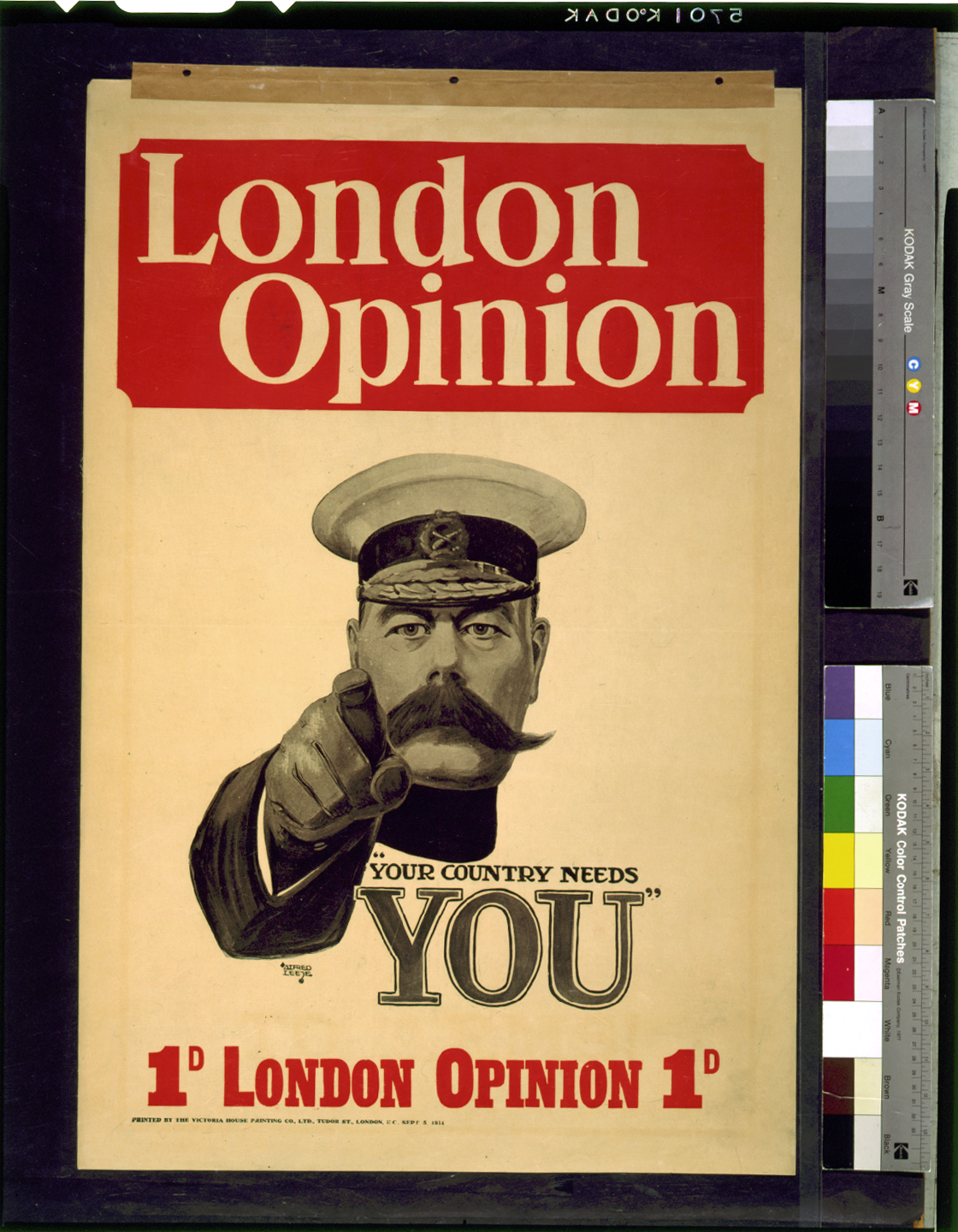
5 September 1914 London Opinion magazine cover by Leete

Alfred Leete, one of Caxton's illustrators, designed the now-famous image of Kitchener as the cover illustration for the 5 September 1914 issue of London Opinion, a popular weekly magazine, taking cues from Field's earlier recruiting advertisement. At the time, the magazine, which sold for one penny, had a circulation of around 300,000.

In response to requests for reproductions, the magazine offered postcard-sized copies for sale – at 100 for 1s 4d "post free". It advertised these alongside other post cards from cartoons published in the London Opinion. The Parliamentary Recruiting Committee obtained permission to use the design in poster form. A similar poster used the words "YOUR COUNTRY NEEDS YOU".

In September a poster printed by Victoria House and credited to the London Opinion carried the image of Kitchener below "Britons" and above "Wants You / Join your Country's Army! God Save The King". In November David Allen and Sons printed the same Kitchener image with "your country needs you" on a recruitment poster below the allied flags alongside details of rates of pay and exhortations to join. Although David Allen were printers for the Parliamentary Recruiting Committee it was not an official publication, lacking a design number and the PRC endorsement.

Kitchener, a "figure of absolute will and power, an emblem of British masculinity", was a natural subject for Leete's artwork as his name was directly attached to the recruiting efforts and the newly forming Kitchener's Army. Le Bas of Caxton Advertising (for whom Leete worked) chose Kitchener for the advertisement because Kitchener was "the only soldier with a great war name, won in the field, within the memory of the thousands of men the country wanted." Kitchener made his name in the Sudan Campaign, avenging the death of General Gordon with brutality and efficiency. He became a hero of "New Imperialism" alongside other widely regarded figures in Britain like Field Marshal Wolseley and Field Marshal Roberts. Kitchener's appearance including his bushy moustache and the collar of his uniform was reminiscent of romanticised Victorian era styles. Kitchener, 6 ft 2 in (188 cm) tall and powerfully built, was for many the personification of the military ethos so popular in the present Edwardian era. After the scorched earth tactics and hard-fought victory of the Second Boer War, Kitchener represented a return to the military victories of the colonial era. The fact that Kitchener's name was not used in the poster demonstrates how easily he was visually recognised. David Lubin opines that the image may be one of the earliest successful celebrity endorsements as the commercial practice expanded greatly in the 1920s. Keith Surridge posits that Kitchener's features evoked the harsh, feared militarism of the Germans, which boded well for British fortunes in the war. Kitchener did not see the end of the war; he died when the cruiser HMS Hampshire carrying him and a delegation to Russia struck a German mine and sank in 1916.

== Impact ==
He is not a great man, he is a great poster.

— Margot Asquith

Leete's drawing of Kitchener was the most famous image used in the British Army recruitment campaign of World War I. It is considered a very significant piece of wartime propaganda as well as a defining image of the war as a whole.

Recruitment posters in general have often been seen as a driving force helping to bring more than a million men into the Army. September 1914, coincident with publication of Leete's image, saw the highest number of volunteers enlisted. The Times recorded the scene in London on 3 January 1915; "Posters appealing to recruits are to be seen on every hoarding, in most windows, in omnibuses, tramcars and commercial vans. The great base of Nelson's Column is covered with them. Their number and variety are remarkable. Everywhere Lord Kitchener sternly points a monstrously big finger, exclaiming 'I Want You'". One contemporaneous publication decried the use of advertising methods to enlist soldiers: "the cold, basilisk eye of a gaudily-lithographed Kitchener rivets itself upon the possible recruit and the outstretched finger of the British Minister of War is levelled at him like some revolver, with the words, 'I want you.' The idea is stolen from the advertisement of a 5c. American cigar." Although it became one of the most famous posters in history, its widespread circulation did not halt the decline in recruiting.

This 30-word poster was an official product of the Parliamentary Recruitment Committee and was more popular contemporaneously. Printed at 20 by 30 in (51 by 76 cm) or 40 by 50 in (100 by 130 cm)

The use of Kitchener's image for recruiting posters was so widespread that Lady Asquith referred to the field marshal simply as "the Poster".

The placement of the Kitchener posters including Alfred Leete's design has been examined and questioned following an Imperial War Museum publication in 1997. The museum suggested that the poster itself was a "non event" and was made popular by postwar advertising by the war museum, perhaps conflating Leete's design with the so-called "30-word" poster, an official product from the Parliamentary Recruitment Committee. The 30-word design was the most popular recruitment poster at the time, having been printed ten times more than Leete's image. Leete's image has been praised for being more arresting, while his accompanying text is also far less verbose. The official wording, taken from a Kitchener speech, may seem more fitting for a character in a Henry James novel. The 30-word recruiting poster was developed as Britons' collective hopes of the war being over by Christmas were dashed in January 1915 and volunteer enlistments fell. A 2013 book researched by James Taylor counters the popular belief that the Leete design was an influential recruitment tool during the war. He claims the original artwork was acquired by the Imperial War Museum in 1917 and catalogued as a poster in error. Though the image of Kitchener (Britain's most popular soldier) inspired several other poster designs, Taylor says he can find no evidence that the poster was as popular or influential as later stated having examined many contemporary photographs, although a photograph from 15 December 1914 taken at the Lancashire and Yorkshire Railway station in Liverpool clearly depicts Leete's depiction among other recruiting posters.

The effectiveness of the image upon the viewer is attributed to what E. B. Goldstein has called the "differential rotation effect". Because of this effect, Kitchener's eyes and his foreshortened arm and hand appear to follow the viewer regardless of the viewer's orientation to the artwork. Historian Carlo Ginzburg compared Leete's image of Kitchener to similar images of Christ and Alexander the Great as depicting the viewer's contact with a powerful figure. Pearl James commented on Ginzburg's analysis agreeing that the strength of the connotation lies with a clever use of discursive psychology and that art historical methods better illuminate why this image has such resonance. The capitalised word "YOU" grabs the reader, bringing them directly to Kitchener's message. The textual focus on "you" engages the reader about their own participation in the war. Nicholas Hiley differs in that Leete's portrayal of Kitchener is less about immediate recruiting statistics but the myth that has grown around the image, including ironic parodies. Leete's Kitchener poster caught the attention of a then eleven-year-old George Orwell, who may have used it as the basis for his description of the "Big Brother" posters in his novel 1984. It remains recognised and parodied in popular culture.

In 1997, the British Army created a recruiting advertisement re-using Leete's image but substituting Kitchener's face for that of a British Army non-commissioned officer of African descent. Leete's image of Kitchener is featured on a 2014 £2 coin produced by sculptor John Bergdahl for the Royal Mint. The coin was the first of a five-year series to commemorate the centennial of the war. The use of Leete's image of Kitchener has been criticised by some for its pro-war implication in light of the human losses of the First World War and the violence of Kitchener's campaign in Sudan. In July 2014, one of only four original posters known to exist went to auction for more than £10,000. The other three originals exist on display in State Library Victoria, the Museum of Brands, Packaging and Advertising, and the Imperial War Museum. Leete's design was also used for a corn maze in the Skylark Garden Centre in Wimblington to mark the centenary of World War I.

Original copies of the poster are rare compared to official PRC posters that were produced in up to a hundred thousand copies. The IWM, established in 1917, did not receive a copy for its collection until the 1950s. Leete's original artwork for the magazine cover version was exhibited alongside war posters in 1919 and donated to the IWM. In 1968, reproductions were printed by the Curwen Press for HMSO and these may have contributed to its later popularity.

== Imitations ==
The image of Lord Kitchener with his hand pointing directly at the viewer has inspired numerous imitations, mostly for military recruitment:

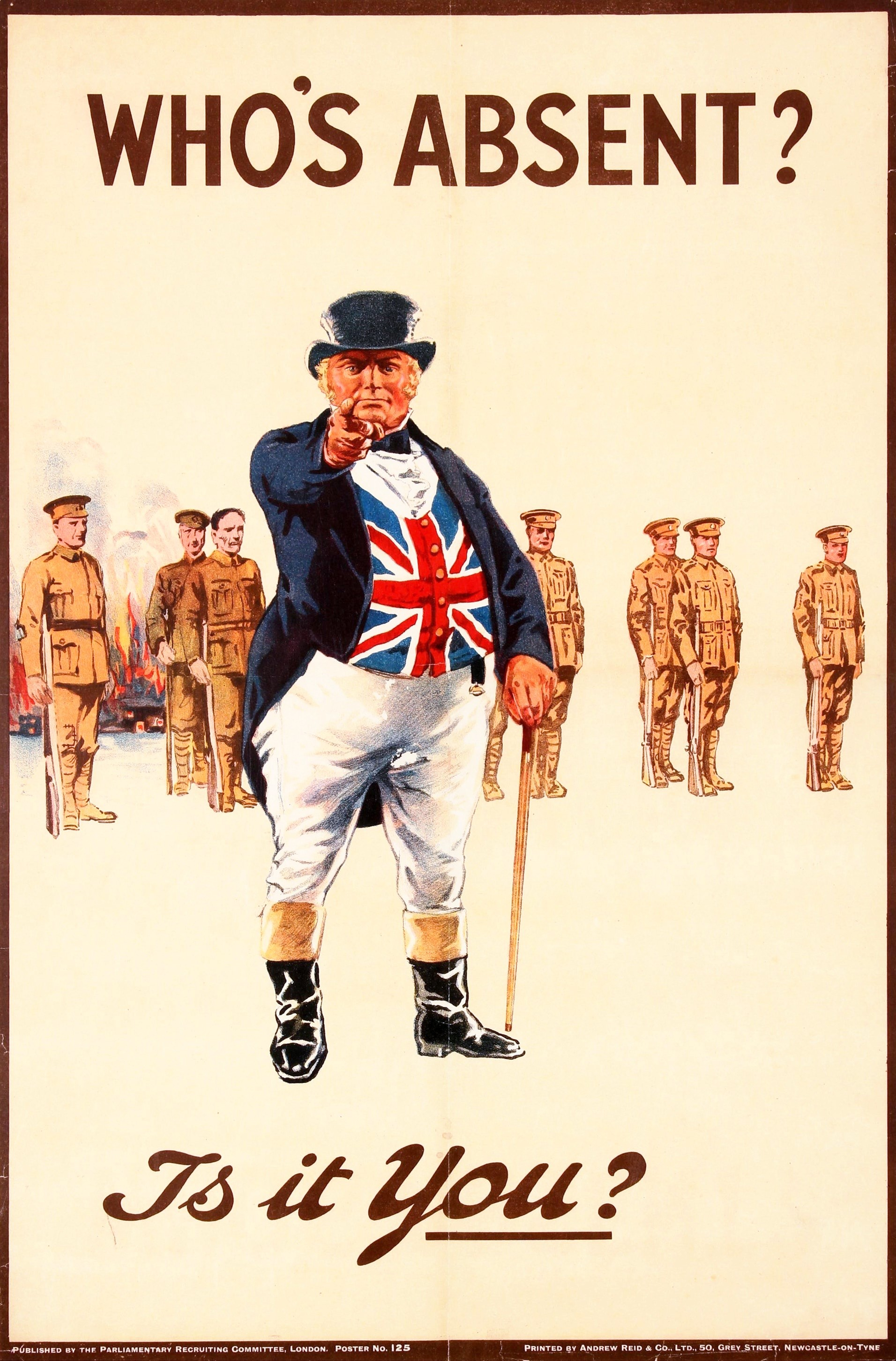
British World War I recruiting poster featuring the national personification, John Bull, c. 1915. "Who's absent? Is it you?"

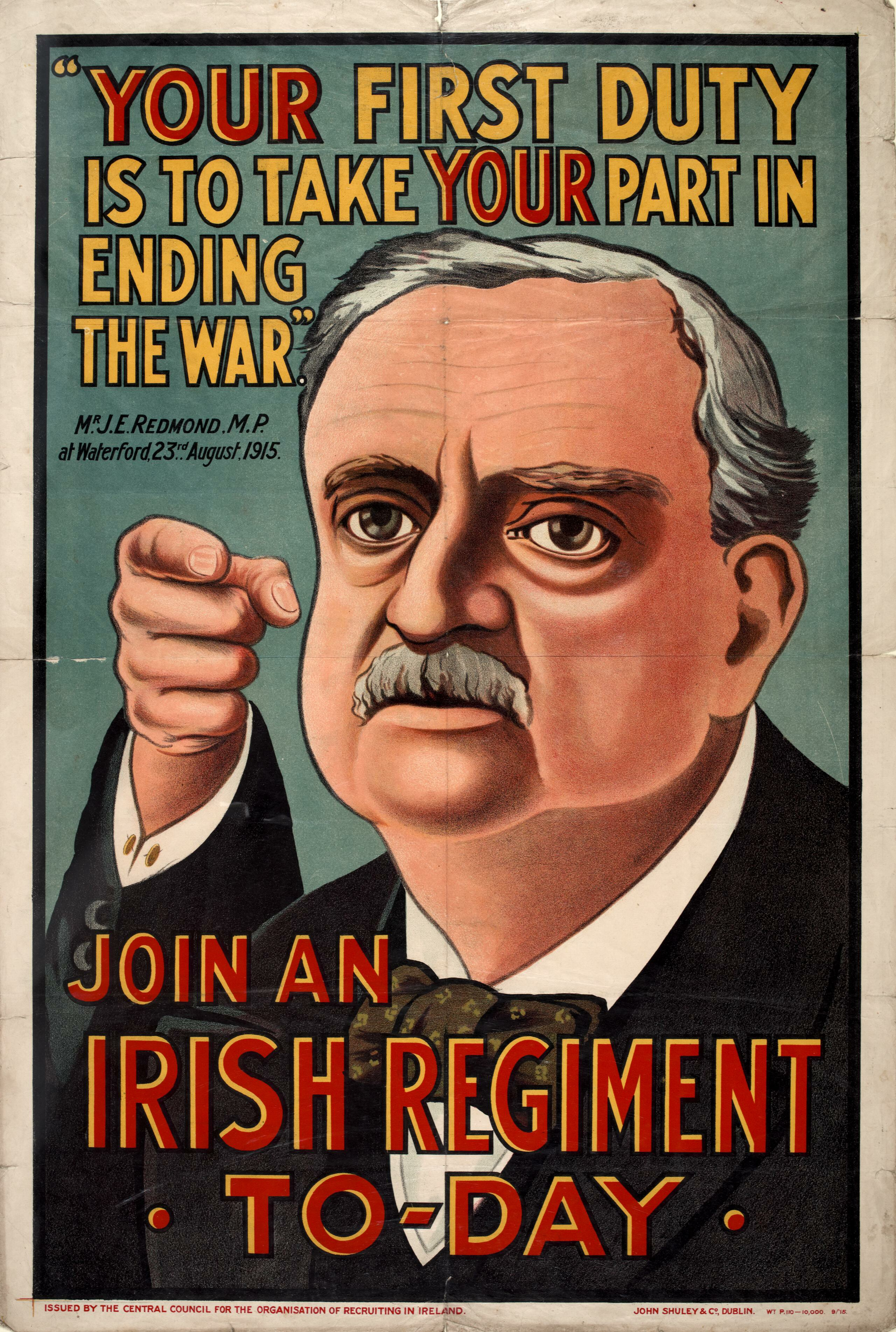
John Redmond. Join an Irish Regiment, 1915

United States, 1917. James Montgomery Flagg's Uncle Sam recruited soldiers for World War I and thereafter. "I Want YOU for U.S. Army"

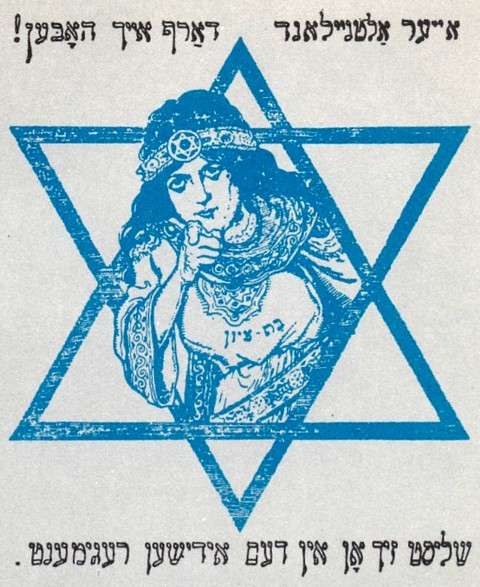
United States, World War I. Daughter of Zion (in Yiddish): "Your Old New Land must have you! Join the Jewish regiment"

Reichswehr recruitment poster by Julius Ussy Engelhard, 1919. "You too should join the Reichswehr"

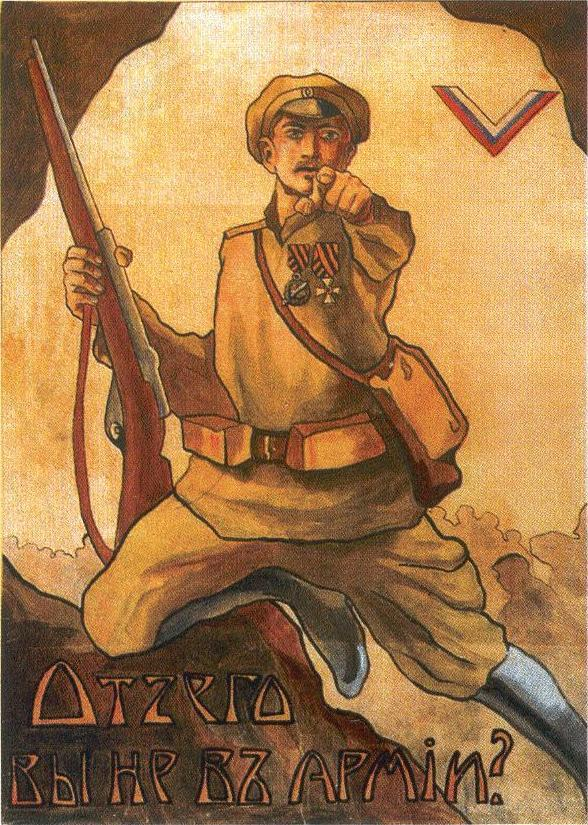
Russian White Army recruitment poster, 1919. "Why aren't you in the army?"

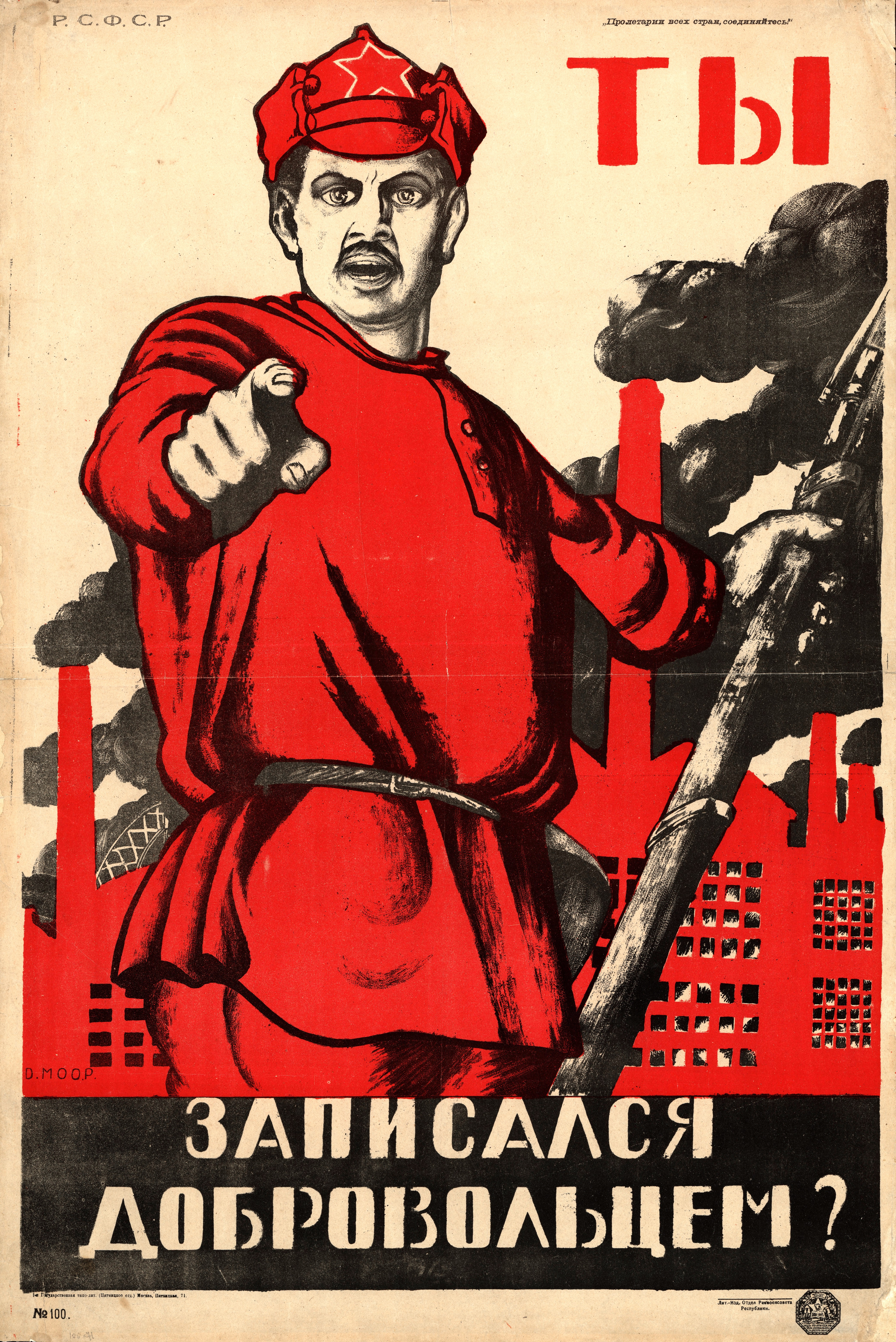
Russian Red Army recruitment poster, 1920. "Did you volunteer [for the Red Army]?"

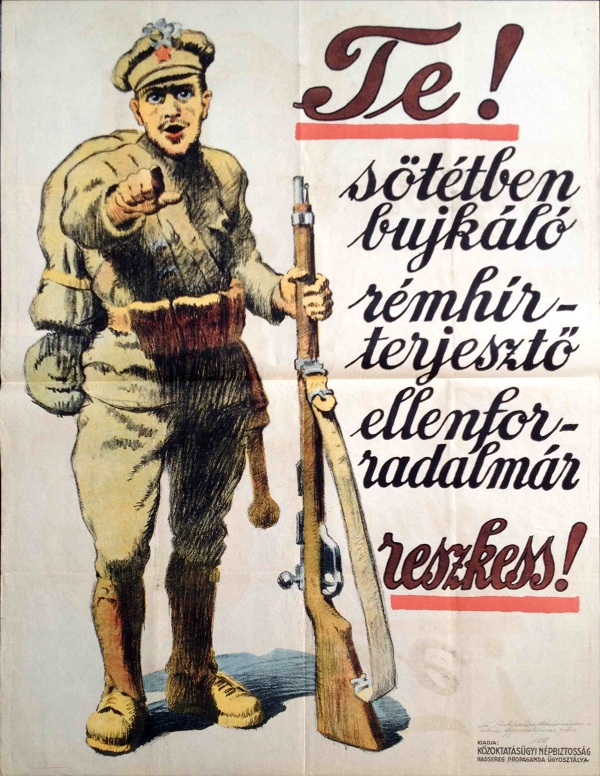
"You! rumour-mongering counter-revolutionary lurking in the dark, tremble!” Hungary, 1919, the time of Hungarian Soviet Republic

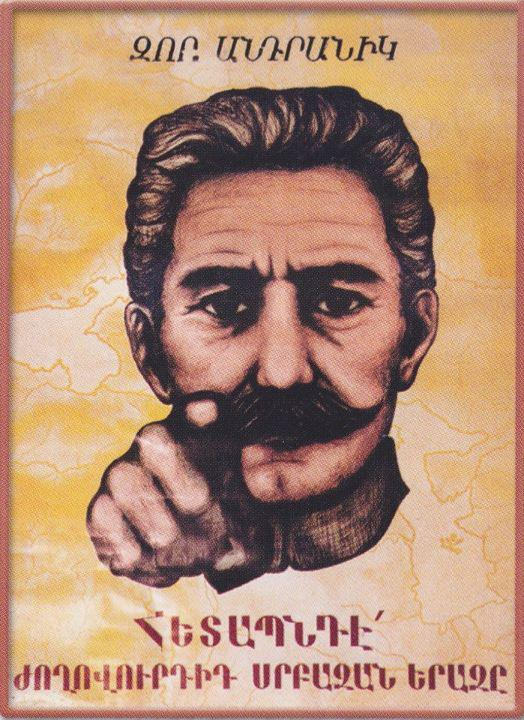
Armenia, Gen. Andranik (1865–1927) poster, "Chase the holy dream of your people"

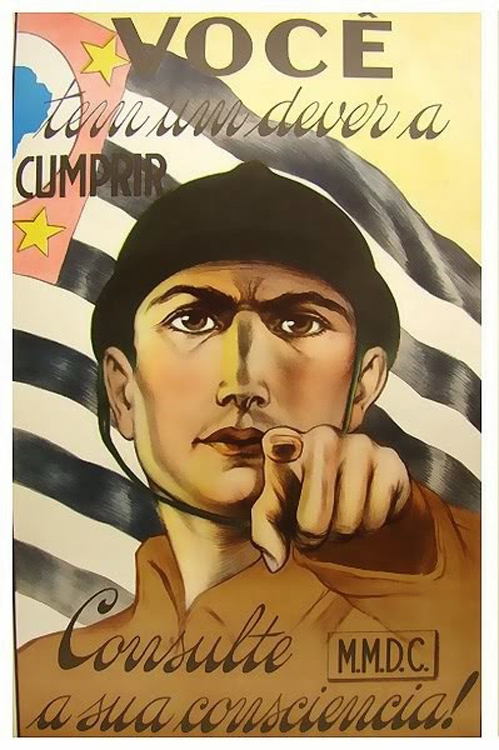
Brazilian Constitutionalist Revolution recruitment poster, 1932. "You have a duty to fulfill. Consult your conscience!"

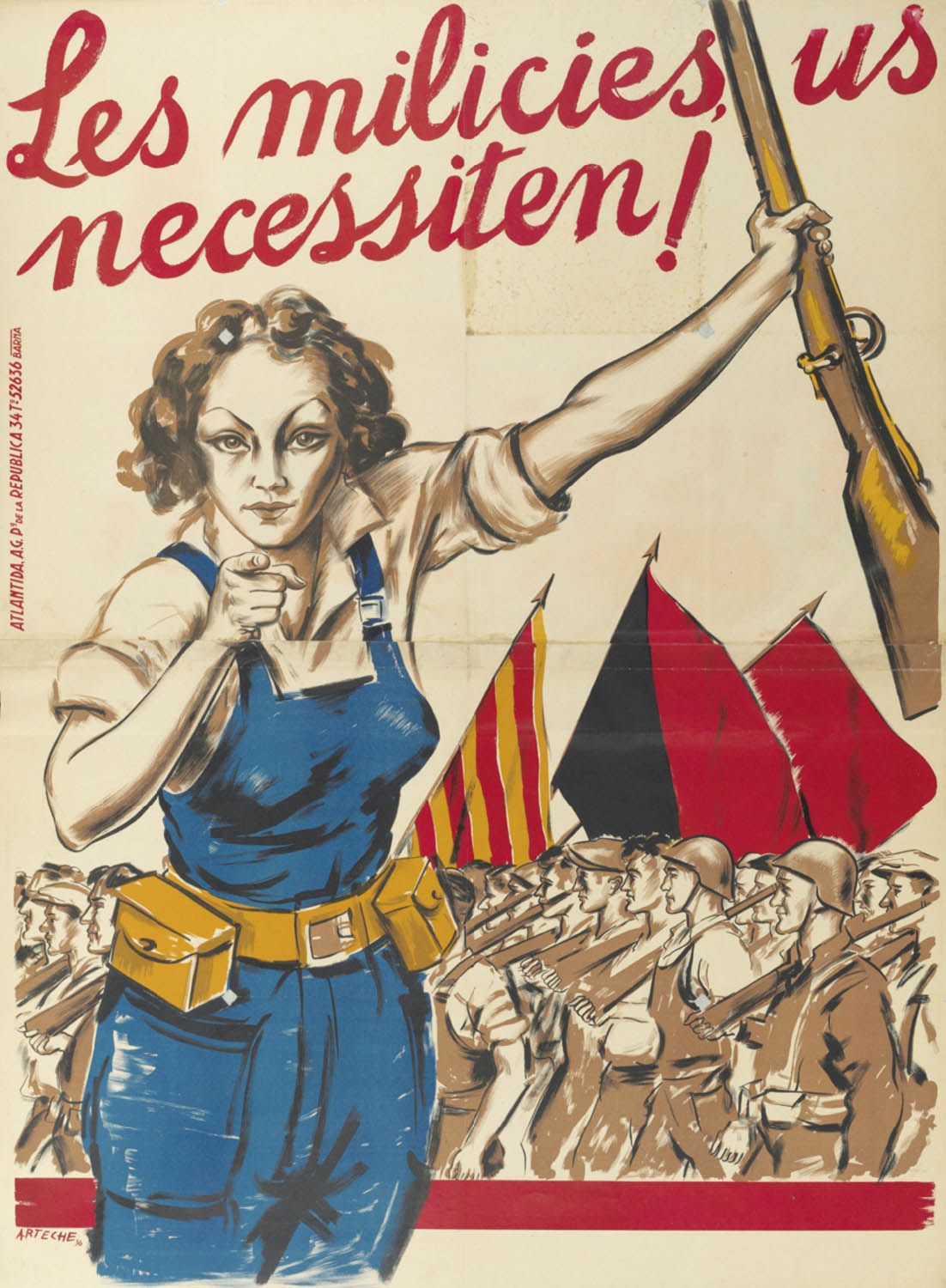
Spanish Civil War Anarchist poster, 1936

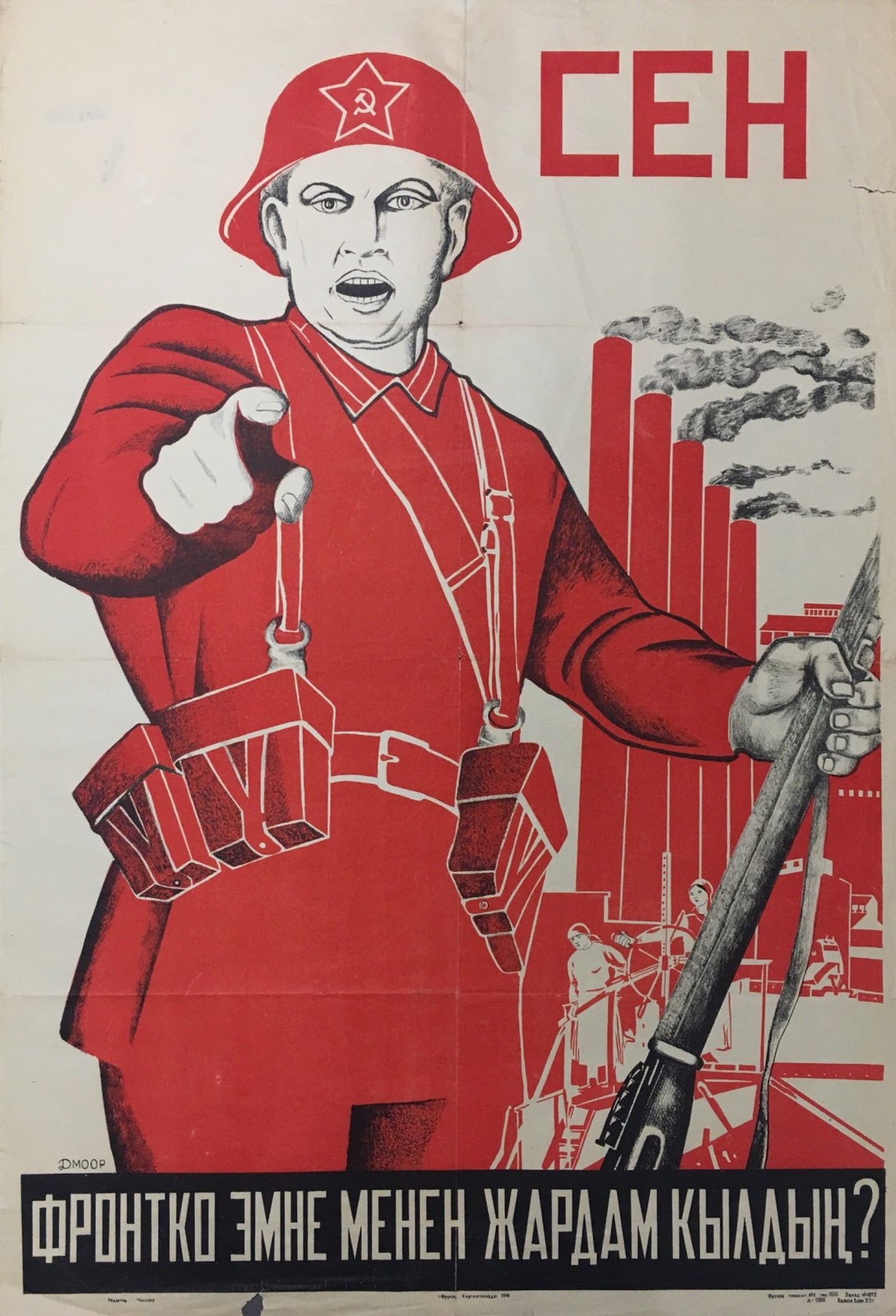
Soviet World War II poster, 1941 (in Kyrgyz). "How did you help the Front?"

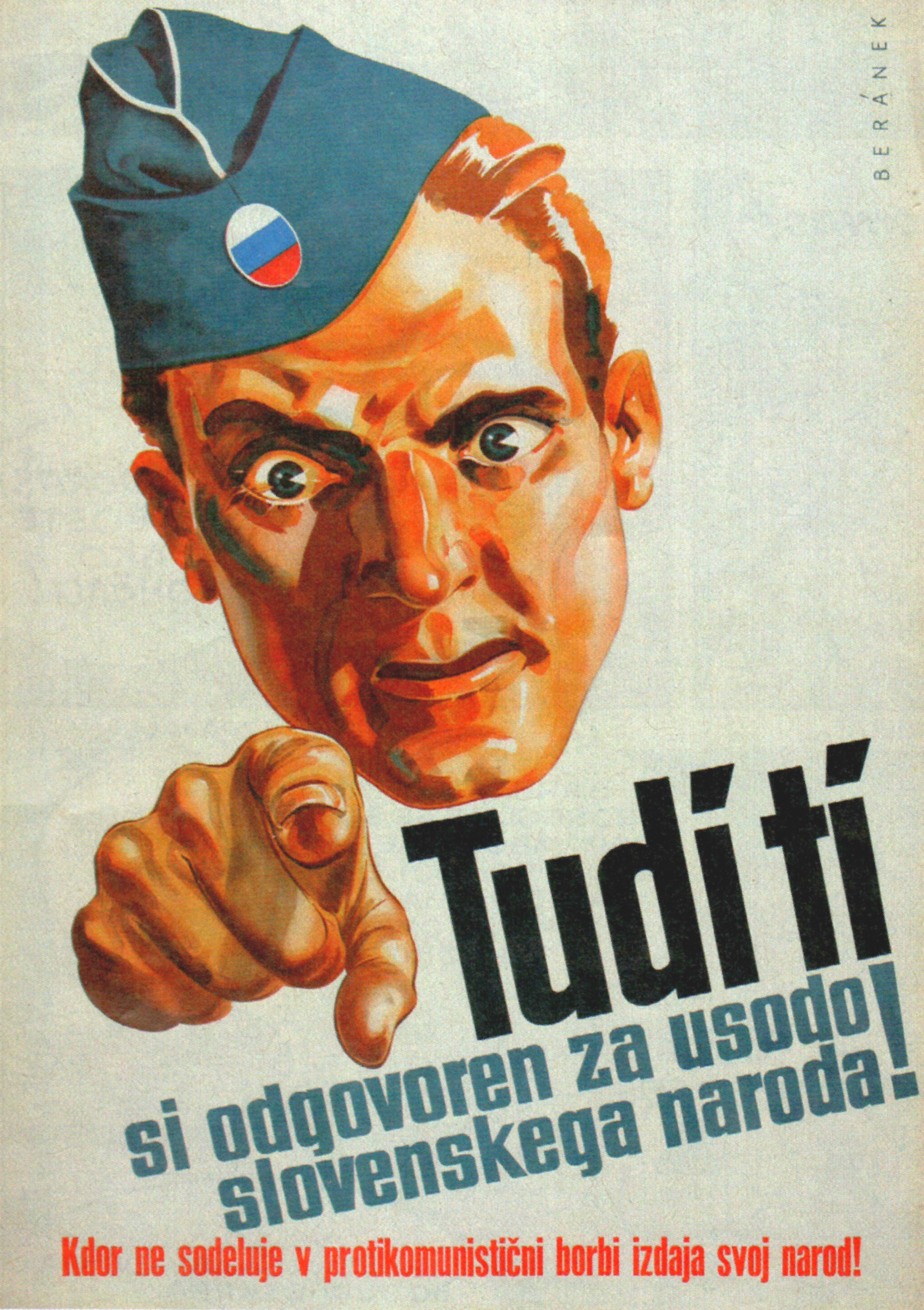
Jože Beranek - Slovene Home Guard, 1944
Some other goals have also been supported:
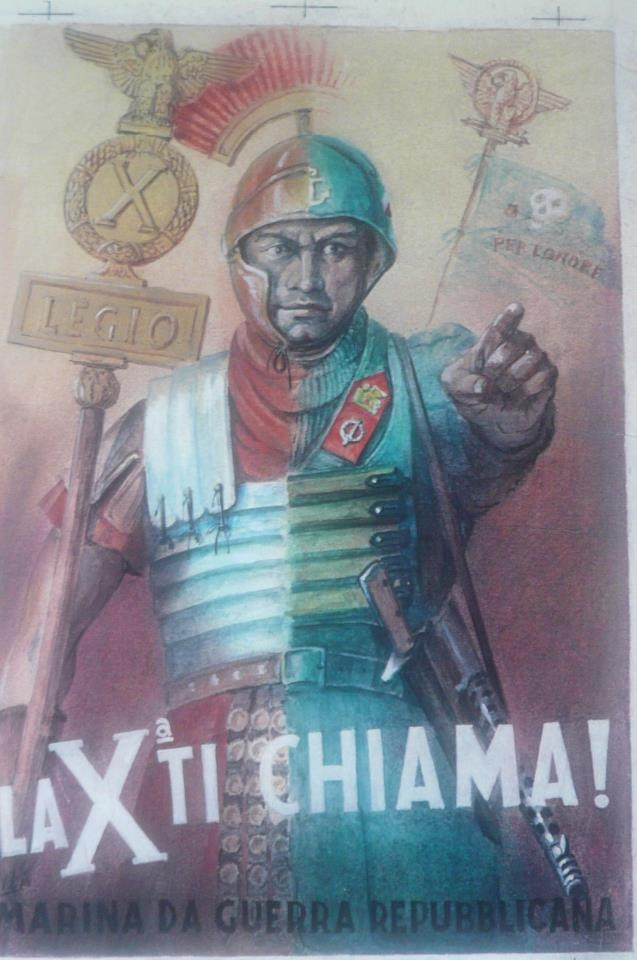
Boccasile: recruitment poster for the National Republican Navy

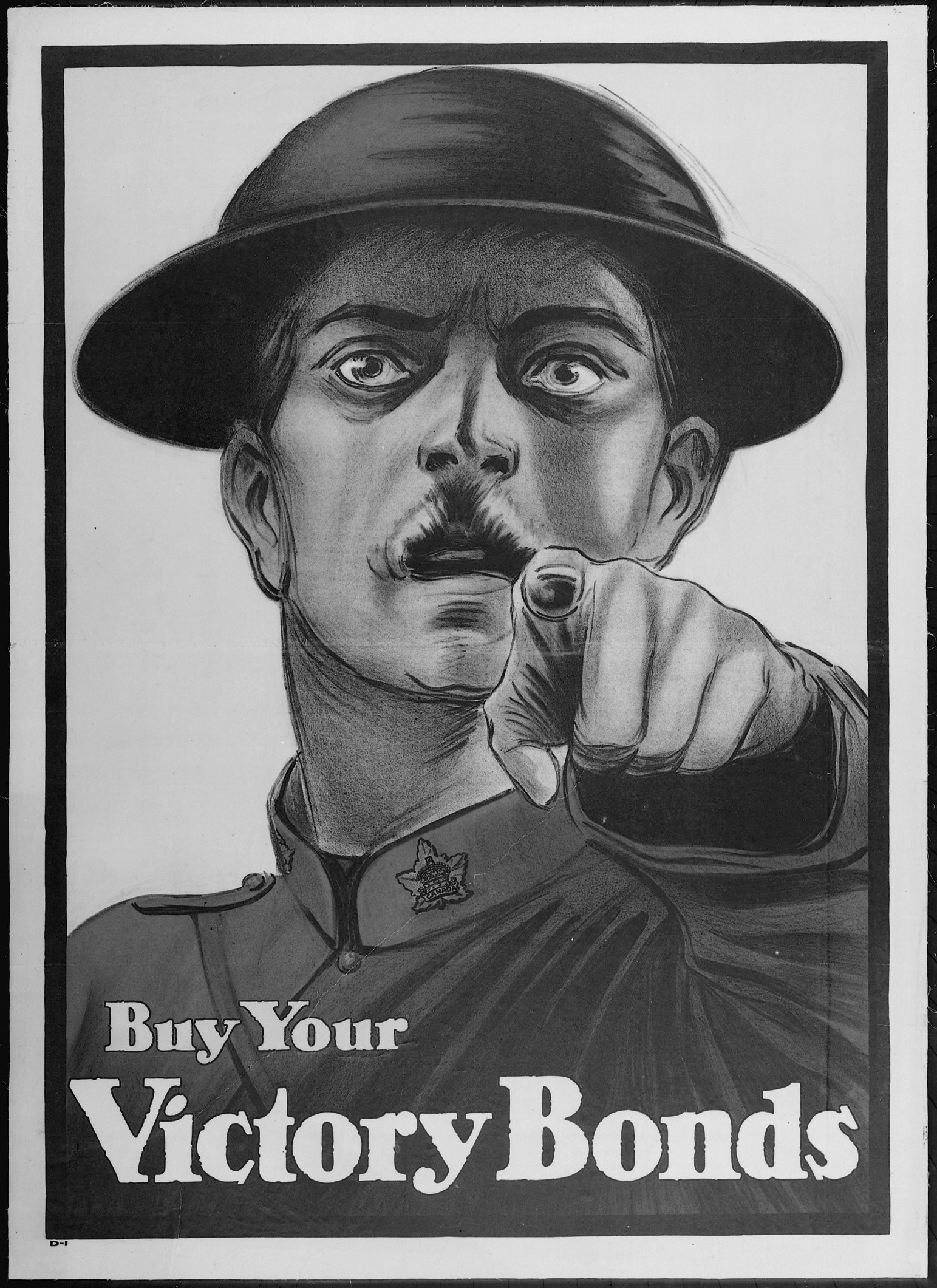
World War I Canadian bond sale poster, c. 1917–1918, derivative of Flagg's Uncle Sam poster, in turn derivative of Lord Kitchener

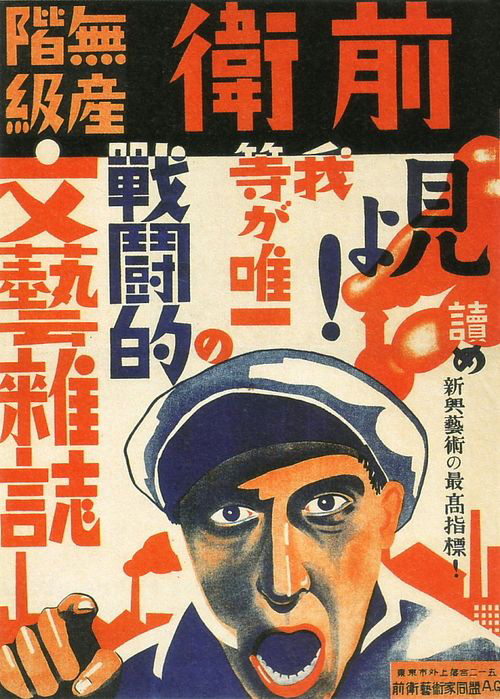
Poster for Japanese Communist Party magazine Zenei (Vanguard), 1928. "Look! We are the only combative proletarian arts magazine."

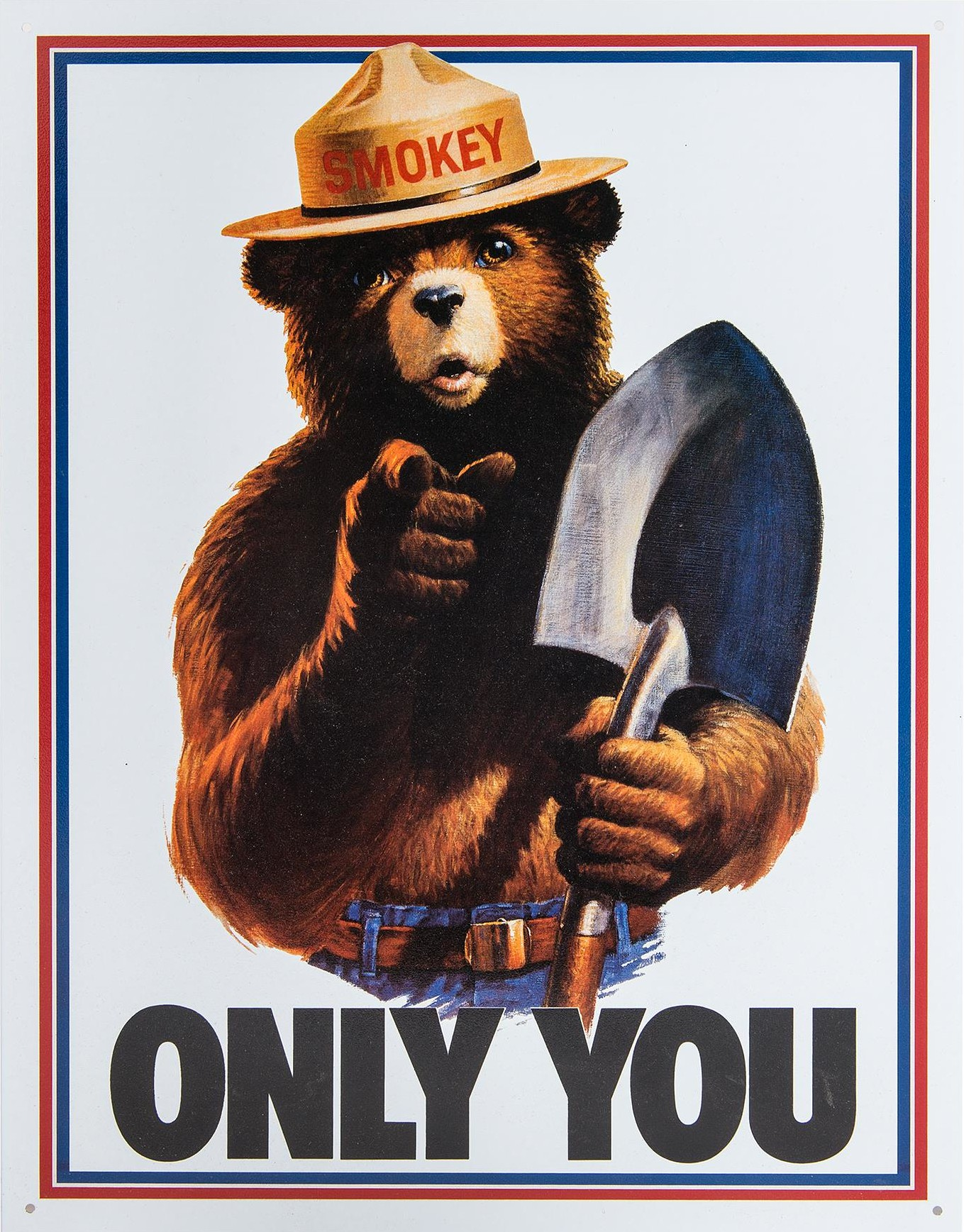
United States 1985 Smokey Bear poster. The "Only You" refers to the character's slogan, "Only You Can Prevent Forest Fires"

== See also ==
- Recruitment to the British Army during the First World War
