= John C. B. Firth =

British World War I flying ace

John Charles Bradley Firth
- Born: 8 August 1894; Idsworth, Hampshire, England
- Died: 23 August 1931 (aged 37); Blyth, Nottinghamshire, England
- Relatives: Mark Firth (grandfather)
- Military career
- Allegiance: United Kingdom
- Branch: British Army; Royal Air Force
- Service years: 1914–1919
- Rank: Major
- Units: Shropshire Light Infantry; No. 45 Squadron RFC; Central Flying School
- Conflicts: World War I
- Awards: Military Cross
- Other work: Steel manufacturer

Major John Charles Bradley Firth MC (8 August 1894 – 23 August 1931) was a British World War I flying ace credited with 11 aerial victories while campaigning on the Italian Front.

== Early life ==
Firth was born in Idsworth, Hampshire, the second son of John Bradley Firth and Emily Harriet (née Ellison), of Bishops Sutton, Hampshire. His grandfather was Mark Firth, steel manufacturer, philanthropist, and former mayor of Sheffield.

== First World War ==
Having served as a cadet in the Officers' Training Corps, Firth was commissioned as a temporary second lieutenant on 29 August 1914.

Firth was a temporary lieutenant of the Shropshire Light Infantry when he was appointed a flying officer on 17 April 1917 and transferred to the General List of the Royal Flying Corps. Having been assigned to No. 45 Squadron RFC as a Sopwith 1 1/2 Strutter pilot, he scored his first win on 12 July 1917; he helped drive down a German Albatros D.III fighter out of control east of Messines. Ten days later, he would drive another one down over Menen. The squadron then re-equipped with Sopwith Camels; Firth would use this craft for his remaining nine victories.

He began by driving down an Albatros two-seater reconnaissance plane over Passchendaele on 25 September 1917. The next day, he destroyed an Albatros D.III in the same vicinity.

On 8 October 1917, Firth was appointed a flight commander, with an accompanying promotion to temporary captain. He set an Albatros D.III aflame on 26 October, to become an ace. On 31 October, he and Peter Carpenter shared in the destruction of a German reconnaissance plane. He scored three "out of control" victories during November to end the year 1917 with nine wins. No. 45 Squadron then moved theaters, to Italy.

On the second day of the new year, Firth shared in the destruction of an enemy reconnaissance plane east of Conegliano and became a double ace. On 18 February 1918, he was awarded the Military Cross for his heroics. "He has on various occasions, during a period of two months, completely destroyed two enemy planes and shot down out of control seven others. The latter, by reason of the manner in which they were observed to go to earth, were probably all rendered useless for further service. He has set a very fine example as a patrol leader, and has displayed much skill and courage."

Firth would score one more time, driving down an Albatros D.V over Ceggia on 27 March 1918. On 4 September 1918, Firth was promoted to temporary major while posted to the Central Flying School as an instructor.

He was also awarded the Italian Bronze Medal of Military Valor on 2 November 1918.

== Post war ==
On 14 February 1919, Firth was transferred to the unemployed list of the Royal Air Force. On 29 April 1919, he married Ruth Ellen [Eleanor], the daughter of Canon John Henry Hodgson, rector of Dogmersfield, Hants, at Winchester Cathedral.

At the time of Firth's death on 23 August 1931, he was in business as a steel manufacturer and residing at Spital House, Blyth, Worksop, Nottingham.
