= London Opinion =

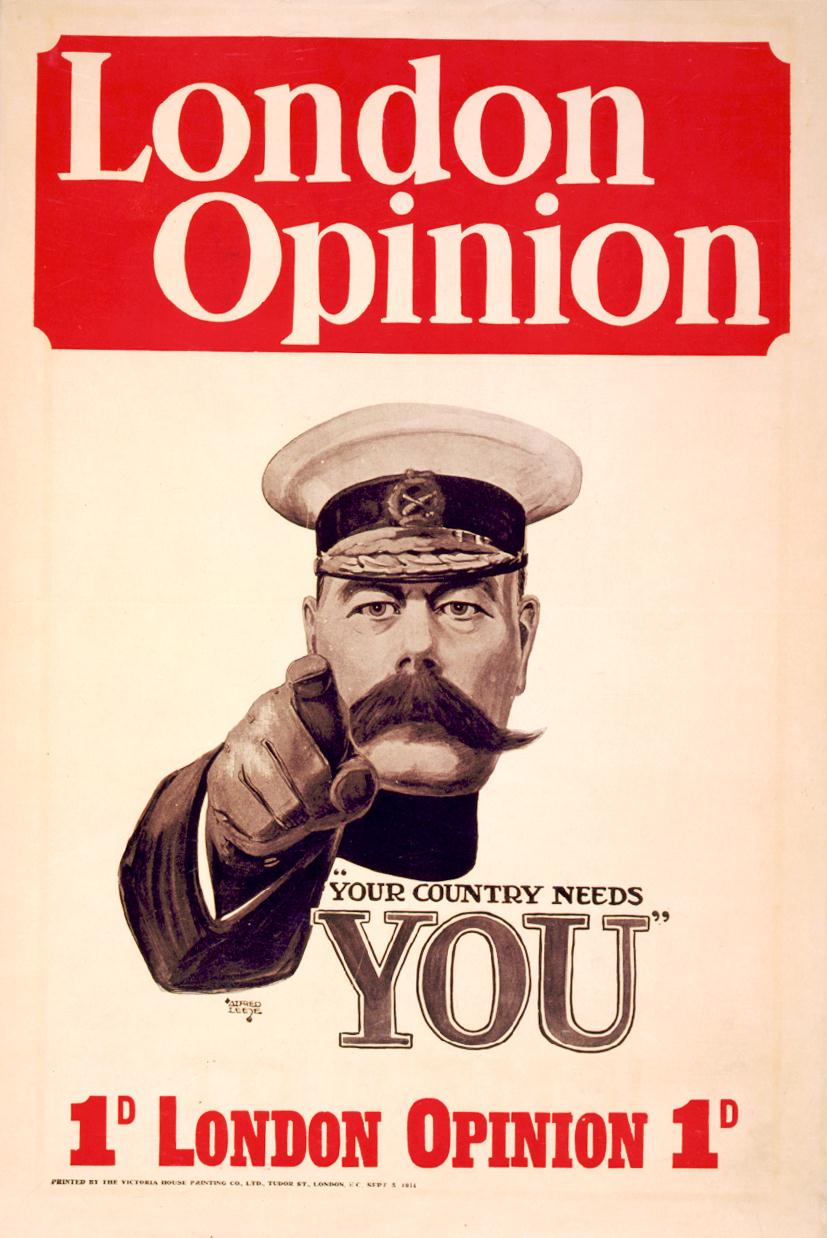
- 1914 cover
- Format: weekly (1903 - 1939); monthly (1939 - 1954)
- Publisher: Pearson / Newnes
- Founded: 26 December 1903
- Ceased publication: April 1954
- Circulation: 300,000 (1914)
- OCLC number: 9862365

London Opinion and Today, often known as London Opinion, was a British magazine published from 1903 until 1954, when it was merged with Pearson's Men Only. It ran weekly from 26 December 1903 to 27 June 1931, and was then published monthly until April 1954. It took over the weekly Humorist in 1940.

Among its most famous covers was the 1914 Lord Kitchener Wants You recruitment picture, designed for the magazine by Alfred Leete, of which the subsequent poster was a variation; at the time London Opinion had a circulation of about 300,000. The magazine started a national limerick craze in 1907.

Alfred Leete's Lord Kitchener poster, with "Reproduced by permission of LONDON OPINION" visible at bottom right

Contributors included cartoonists Norman Thelwell, Arthur Watts, Rowel Friers, Bertram Prance and Arthur Ferrier.
