= Mark Firth =

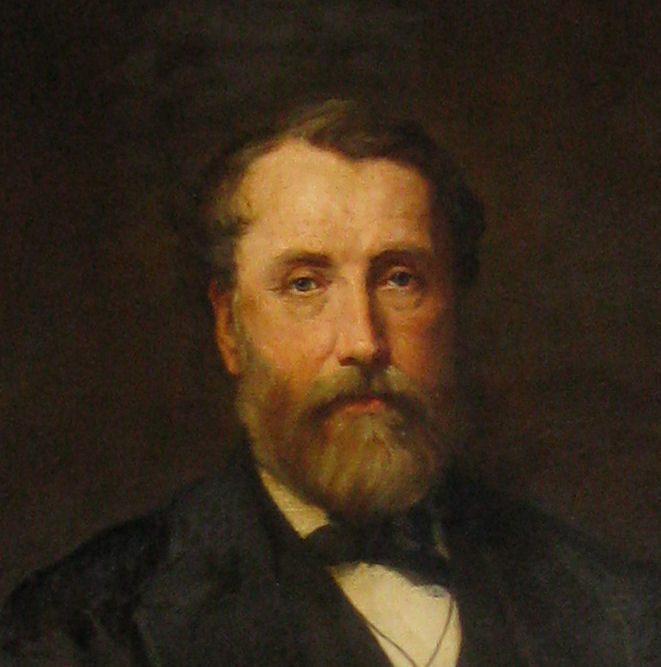
- Firth as Master Cutler, at Cutlers' Hall, Sheffield.
- Born: 25 April 1819; Sheffield, England
- Died: 28 November 1880 (aged 61); Sheffield, England
- Resting place: Sheffield General Cemetery
- Occupation: Steel manufacturer
- Years active: 1842–1880
- Title: Mayor of Sheffield
- Term: 1874–1875
- Political party: Liberal
- Spouses: Sarah Bingham Taylor (m. 1841–1855) Caroline Gedling (m. 1857–1880)
- Children: Sarah; Thomas; Ann; Mary; Margaret; John; Mark; Alfred; Caroline; Bernard; Charles Henry (b 1868); Rachael (b 1870)
- Parent(s): Thomas Firth; Mary Loxley
- Relatives: Major John Charles Bradley Firth (grandson)

Mark Firth (25 April 1819 – 28 November 1880) was an English industrialist and philanthropist.

== Biography ==
Firth was born in Sheffield, the son of Thomas Firth (1789–1850), of Pontefract, York, and Mary Loxley.

He joined the crucible steel works of Sanderson Brothers where his father worked as head smelter, but left in 1842 to set up his own business with his brother, Thomas Jr. Their father joined them shortly afterwards, and in 1852 Thomas Firth & Sons had expanded into larger premises at the Norfolk Works in Savile Street, which had the largest rolling mill in Sheffield.

The Firth's business expanded into the armaments market, installing two large steam hammers in 1863. In 1871, the company cast the thirty five ton "Woolwich Infant" gun. In 1875 they produced an eighty-ton gun.

Firth was elected to the office of Master Cutler in 1867, which he held for the following two years. He was elected Mayor of Sheffield in 1874. In 1875, he presented a thirty-six acre estate to the town of Sheffield as Firth Park. He also built a mansion for himself on the outskirts of Sheffield at Oakbrook, Ranmoor, now part of Notre Dame High School. In 1879, he opened Firth College to teach arts and science subjects, which later became part of the University of Sheffield. Firth lends his name to the Firth Wing of the Northern General Hospital, and Firth Court of the university.

He was a Methodist and a Liberal.

On 16 November 1880 Firth was at his Norfolk Works when he suffered a stroke, and died 12 days later.

He is buried in Sheffield General Cemetery on Cemetery Road, where his monument is Grade II listed.

== Personal life ==
Firth was twice married and had twelve children.

He first married Sarah Bingham Taylor (1818–1855) in Sheffield on 15 September 1841, and they had five children:

- Sarah Bingham Taylor Firth (1843–1927), married Marriott Hall, MRCS, in Sheffield, 24 May 1866.
- Thomas and Ann Elizabeth Firth (b. & d. 1845).
- Mary Ellen Firth (1847–1848).
- Margaret Maria Firth (1853–1869).

Secondly, he married Caroline Gedling Bradley (1833–1894) at The Methodist New Connexion Chapel, Nottingham on 3 September 1857. They had seven children:

- John Bradley Firth (1859-c.1930), father of Major John Charles Bradley Firth, MC, (1894–1931).
- Mark Firth, JP, (1860–1929).
- Alfred Firth (1862–1883).
- Caroline Bradley Firth (1864–1949).
- Lieutenant–Colonel Bernard Alexander Firth, JP VD, (1866–1929), CO, 4th Battalion, York and Lancaster Regiment.
- Charles Henry Bramley Firth (1868–1959)
- Rachel (1870–1940) Married George Charles Hague in 1897

== See also ==
- List of people from Sheffield
