= Military Service Act 1916 =

Act of the Parliament of the United Kingdom

Military Service Act 1916 (Note: Section 4.)
- Act of Parliament
- Parliament of the United Kingdom
- Long title: An Act to make provision with respect to Military Service in connexion with the present War.
- Citation: 5 & 6 Geo. 5. c. 104
- Territorial extent: United Kingdom

Dates
- Royal assent: 27 January 1916
- Commencement: 17 February 1916
- Repealed: 22 December 1927
Other legislation
Amends	Territorial and Reserve Forces Act 1907
Repealed by	Statute Law Revision Act 1927
Relates to	Military Service Act 1916 (Session 2); Military Service Act 1918

Status: Repealed

Text of statute as originally enacted

The Military Service Act 1916 (5 & 6 Geo. 5. c. 104) was an act of the Parliament of the United Kingdom during the First World War to impose conscription in Great Britain, but not in Ireland or any other British jurisdiction.

== Passage ==
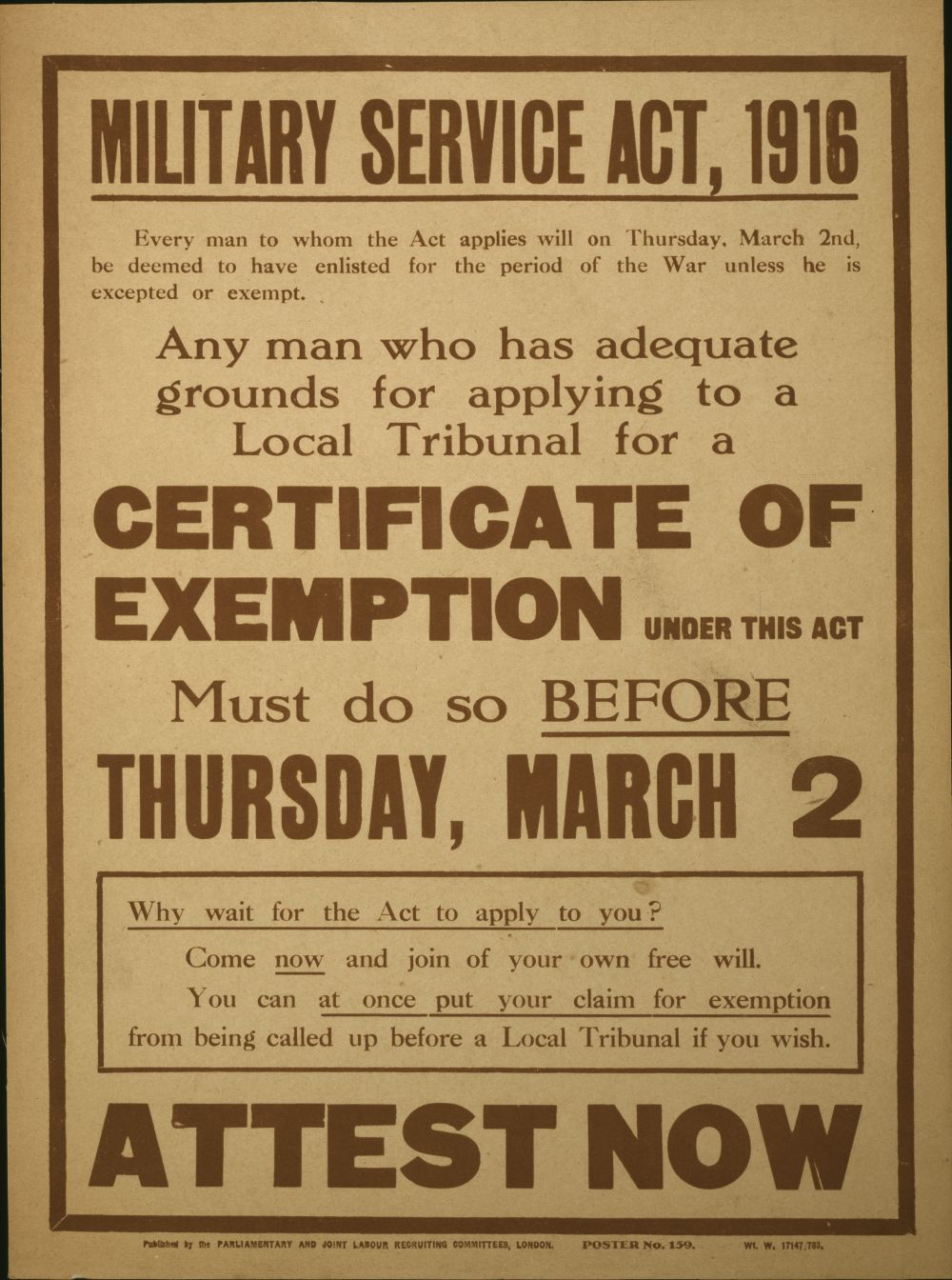
1916 poster publicising the act

The bill which became the act was introduced by Prime Minister H. H. Asquith in January 1916. It received royal assent on 27 January, and came into force on 2 March 1916. Previously the British Government had relied on voluntary enlistment, and latterly a kind of moral conscription called the Derby Scheme.

The conscription issue divided the Liberal Party including the Cabinet. Sir John Simon resigned as Home Secretary and attacked the government in his resignation speech in the House of Commons, where 35 Liberals voted against the bill, alongside 13 Labour MPs and 59 Irish Nationalists.

== Provisions ==
The act specified that men from 18 to 41 years old were liable to be called up for service in the army unless they were eligible for exemptions listed under this act, including men who were married, widowed with children, serving in the Royal Navy, a minister of religion, or working in one of a number of reserved occupations, or for conscientious objection. A second act in May 1916, the Military Service Act 1916 (Session 2) (6 & 7 Geo. 5. c. 15), extended liability for military service to married men, and a third act, the Military Service Act 1918 (7 & 8 Geo. 5. c. 62), extended the upper age limit to 51.

Men or employers who objected to an individual's call-up could apply to a local military service tribunal. These tribunals had powers to grant exemption from service, usually conditional or temporary, under the eligibility criteria which for the first time in history included conscientious objection. There was right of appeal to a county appeal tribunal, and finally to a Central Tribunal in Westminster in London.

== Ireland ==
Due to political considerations, the act applied only to male British subjects ordinarily resident in Great Britain. It never extended to those living in Ireland, which was then part of the United Kingdom of Great Britain and Ireland.

The Conscription Crisis of 1918 occurred when the British Government tried to impose conscription on Ireland. Sinn Féin was publicly perceived to be the key instigator of anti-conscription feeling, and on 17 May the Lord Lieutenant of Ireland, Lord French, claiming there was a treasonable plot between Sinn Féin and the Germans, ordered the arrest of 73 Sinn Féin leaders. The outcome was greater public support for Sinn Féin.

== Subsequent developments ==
The whole act was repealed by section 1 of, and part I of the schedule to, the Statute Law Revision Act 1927 (17 & 18 Geo. 5. c. 42), which came into force on 22 December 1927.

== See also ==
- Recruitment to the British Army during the First World War
- Reserved occupations
