= Alfred Leete =

British graphic artist (1882–1933)

- Leete at his desk, date unknown
- Born: 1882; Thorpe Achurch, Northamptonshire, England
- Died: 1933 (aged 50–51); Pembroke Square, London, England
- Education: Kingsholme School; The School of Science and Art, Weston
- Notable work: "Lord Kitchener Wants You"

Alfred Ambrose Chew Leete (1882–1933) was a British graphic artist.

== Biography ==
Born at Thorpe Achurch, Northamptonshire, he studied at Kingsholme School and The School of Science and Art (now Weston College) in Weston-super-Mare, before moving to London in 1899 and taking a post as an artist with a printer.

Leete's career as a paid artist began in 1897, when the Daily Graphic accepted one of his drawings. Later, he contributed regularly to a number of magazines, including Punch, the Strand Magazine and Tatler. As a commercial artist he designed numerous posters and advertisements, especially in the 1910s and 1920s, for such brands as Rowntree's, Guinness and Bovril, and his series of advertisements for the Underground Electric Railways Company (the London Underground) are very well known.

Leete's work as a wartime propagandist includes the poster for which he is most renowned, the Lord Kitchener poster design, which first appeared on the cover of the weekly magazine London Opinion on 5 September 1914. During the First World War Leete also drew two comics Schmidt the Spy and The Bosch Book, which ridiculed the German army.

Leete died of a seizure, following a heart attack, at his home in Pembroke Square, London, in 1933. He had suffered from high blood pressure and heart trouble, and had been taken ill three weeks earlier in Italy. The Rome Express was stopped at Genoa to allow him to return to England.

Jim Aulich, in the Oxford Dictionary of National Biography, wrote of Leete that "His prolific output was characterized by its humour, keen observation of the everyday, and an eye for strong design." In 2004, his work was displayed in his native Weston-super-Mare, at the Weston Museum.

== Gallery ==
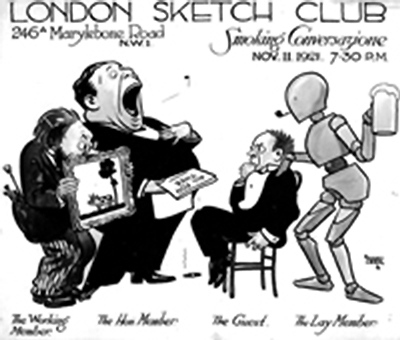
Invitation to one of the regular "smoking" evenings at the London Sketch Club, dated 11 November 1921, designed by Alfred Leete.

"Lord Kitchener Wants You", first published on 5 September 1914
