= Derby Scheme =

1915 propaganda scheme to enlist soldiers in the United Kingdom

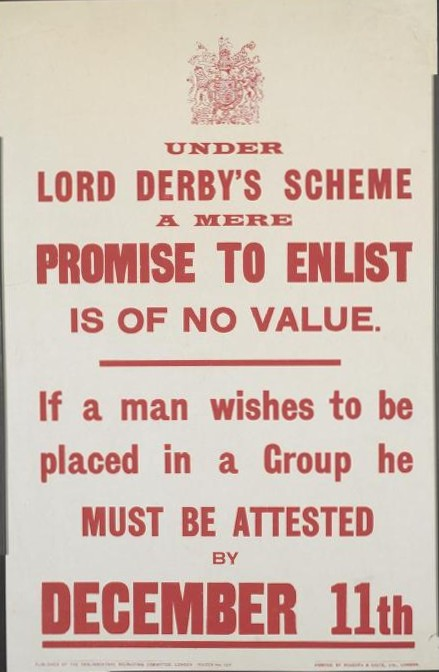
Derby Scheme poster of November 1915

The Derby Scheme was introduced during World War I in Britain in the autumn of 1915 by Herbert Kitchener's new Director General of Recruiting, Edward Stanley, 17th Earl of Derby (1865–1948) after which it was named.

It used strong pressure tactics to try to pressure men regarded as eligible to serve in the military to voluntarily enlist. In spite of persuading nearly 2/3 of single men and almost half of married to do so, wartime manpower needs were sufficiently great that by 1916 the Military Service Act would be passed instituting compulsory conscription.

== History ==
By mid-1915, the war was lasting longer than had been anticipated and the British military required more recruits; 'Derby's scheme' was a survey to determine how many could be obtained, via the use of appointed canvassers visiting eligible men at home to persuade them to 'volunteer' for war service.

Every eligible man, aged 18 to 41, who was not in a "starred" (essential) occupation was required to make a public declaration of whether he would enlist immediately or defer his service to a later date, to appear when called. When the scheme was announced, some went to the recruiting office immediately, rather than wait for the inevitable. The process began with each eligible man’s registry card from the August 1915 National Registry being copied onto another card which was sent to his local constituency's Parliamentary recruiting committee. This Committee appointed 'canvassers' who they considered "tactful and influential men", and not themselves liable for service, to visit the men at their homes. Many canvassers were experienced in politics, though discharged veterans and the fathers of serving soldiers proved the most effective, while some just used threats to persuade. Although women were not allowed to canvas, they did contribute by tracking men who had moved address.

Each man would be given a copy of a letter from the Earl of Derby, explaining the programme and rather dramatically stating that they were in "a country fighting, as ours is, for its very existence". Faced with the canvasser, each man had to say whether or not he would attest to join the forces; no one was permitted to speak for him.

Those who did agree to attest had to promise to present themselves at their recruiting office within 48 hours, while some were accompanied there immediately to make sure. If they passed a medical examination, they were sworn in and paid a 'signing bonus' of 2s 9d. The next day, men who chose to defer their service until called at a later date ("Class A") were transferred to Section B Army Reserve. A khaki armband bearing the Royal Crown was provided to all who had enlisted, or who had been rejected, as well as to starred and discharged men, pictured here: (This ceased once conscription was introduced, Jan.1916). The data of each Class A enlistee was copied onto a white card, used to assign him to one of 46 married or unmarried age groups. It was promised that only entire groups would be called for active service, after 14 days prior notice. Single men's groups would be called before married, any who wed after the day the scheme began were still classified as single. Married men were assured their group would not be called if too few single men attested - unless conscription was introduced.

The scheme was undertaken during November and December 1915 and obtained 318,553 medically fit single men. However, 38% of single men and 54% of married men had resisted the mass orchestrated pressure to enlist in the war, so the British Government, determined to ensure a supply of replacements for the mounting casualties overseas, had to pass the Military Service Act 1916, which authorized conscription, on 27 January 1916.

== See also ==
- Lord Kitchener Wants You
