= Western Bank Campus =

Main campus of the University of Sheffield, England

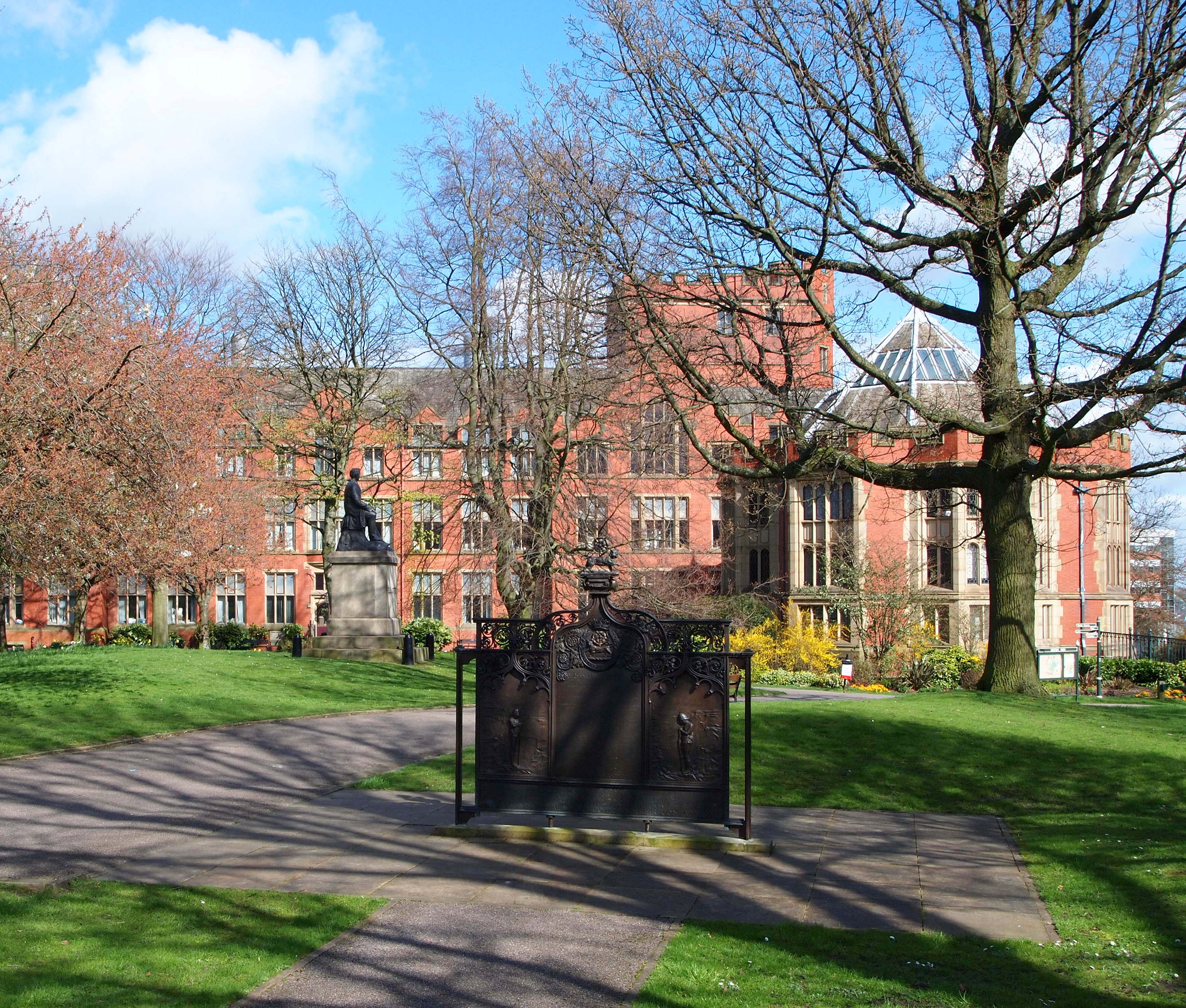
Firth Court, the university's main administrative block, viewed from Weston Park

The Western Bank Campus is the main campus of the University of Sheffield. It lies one mile to the west of Sheffield city centre and is bounded by Upper Hanover Street to the east, Glossop Road to the south, Clarkson Street to the west, and Winter Street to the north. The campus includes Firth Court, Alfred Denny Building, Western Bank library and Arts Tower, Geography and Planning building, Bartolomé House, Dainton and Richard Roberts Buildings, the Sheffield Students' Union building, the Octagon Centre, Graves Building, Hicks Building and the Information Commons.

== Location ==
The Western Bank Campus refers to the campus area located to the west of the Sheffield Inner Ring Road. (Note: The name "Western Bank Campus" is not shown on the university map but appears in university's web pages and documents) It is so called because this campus has expanded from Firth Court on Western Bank. To the east of the ring road is the St George's campus area of the university. The Western Bank Campus is divided by Western Bank (A57) into the northern and the southern areas. The University Concourse under the A57 flyover connects Alfred Denny Building on the north of Western Bank and Students' Union on the south. Three pedestrian crossings (at Firth Court, at the Arts Tower and at Favell Road) allows easily moving between buildings in this cluster. The Western Bank Campus is served by University of Sheffield tram stop, situated on the Blue and Yellow routes of the South Yorkshire Supertram network.

== Buildings in the northern area ==
=== Firth Court and Alfred Denny Building ===
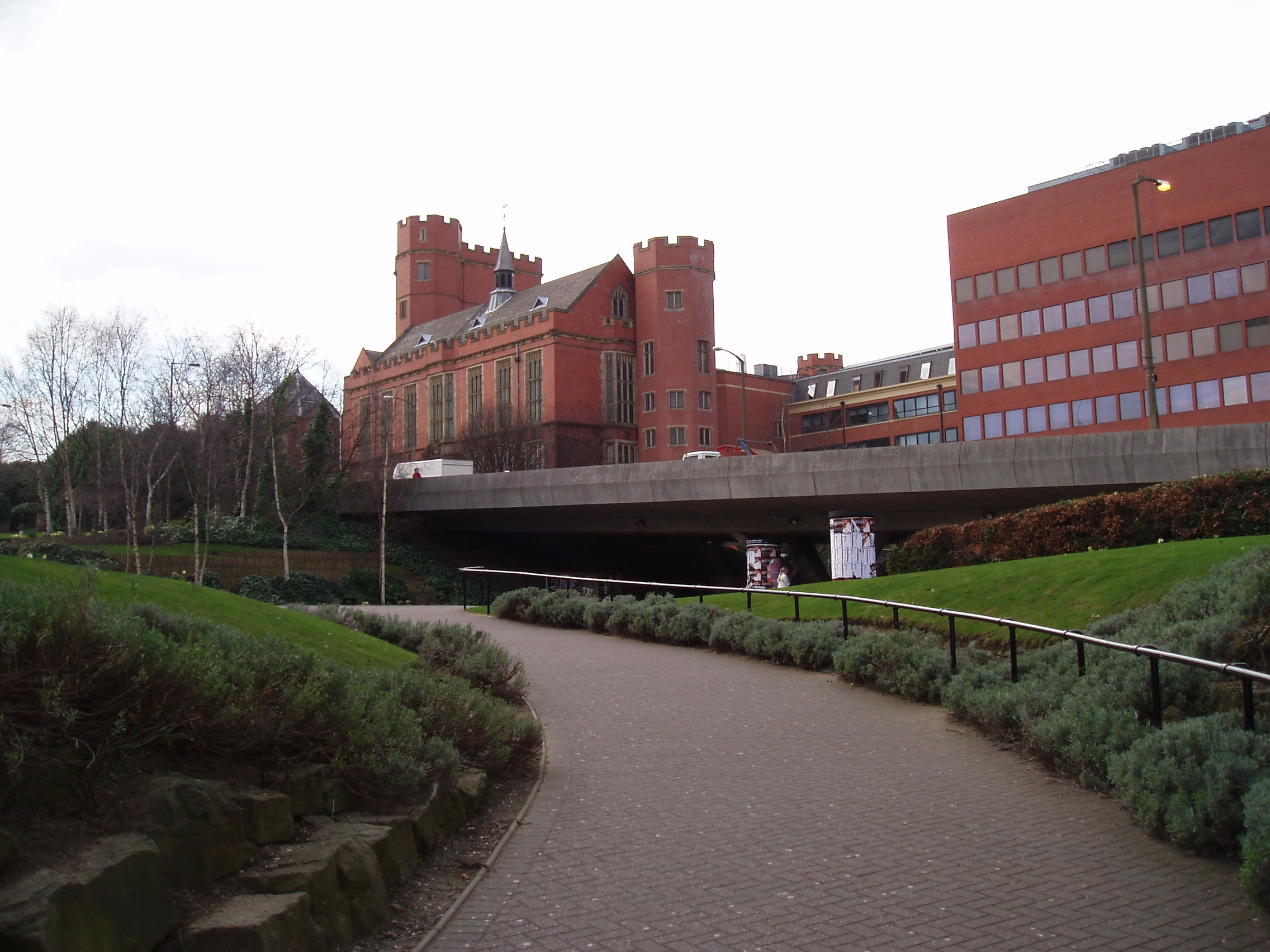
The University Concourse underpass that leads to Firth Court and Alfred Denny Building

Firth Court is the main administrative centre for the University of Sheffield, stands at the heart of the university precinct on Western Bank. It originally housed the Arts, Science and Medicine departments, while it is currently home to the Department for Molecular Biology and Biotechnology and Biomedical Science. The Grade II listed building, named after Mark Firth, was designed by Edward Mitchel Gibbs and built in 1903 to 1905. Firth Court is a red brick Edwardian building with ashlar dressings and slate roofs in Perpendicular Revival style. The building was opened by King Edward VII and Queen Alexandra in 1905.

Located to the left of Firth Court, the Rotunda is the Registrar and Secretary's Office. Formerly the Edgar Allen Library, it is a neo-Gothic style octagonal chapter house opened 26 April 1909 by Prince and Princess of Wales, which has a circular arcade with compound piers and transoms containing portraits of university benefactors. It is linked to the main block via a glazed corridor. The Firth Court quadrangle, comprising Firth Hall Block, North Block, West Block, and Florey and Addison buildings, was completed in 1914 also by Gibbs. Gibbs planned to build a double quadrangle but was never happened. During the Second World War, the quadrangle was converted into an air raid shelter.

Alfred Denny Building, a red brick building named after the first Professor of Zoology at the department, is connected to Firth Court via the Addison Building. The building houses the Biomedical Science, Animal and Plant Science Departments including its associated museum, Disability and Dyslexia Support Service, and the Perak Laboratories.

=== Western Bank Library and Arts Tower ===
The Arts Tower is a Grade II* listed building opened in 1966. It was the tallest structure in Sheffield from 1965 to 2010, and is the tallest university building in the UK. The building, previously housed several academic departments, is now mainly an administration block and has the architecture department in it. The Arts Tower houses one of Europe's few surviving examples of a paternoster lift.

A bridge at the mezzanine level links the tower to the Western Bank Library. The two buildings, both designed by Gollins Melvin Ward, are intended to be viewed together. The library was designed as a result of a national competition. It was opened by poet T. S. Eliot in 1959. Formerly known as the University Library, the Western Bank Library was the main library of the University of Sheffield until the Information Commons was established in April 2007. The Grade II*-listed library is home to 25,000 rare books and 150 special collections.

=== Bartolomé House ===
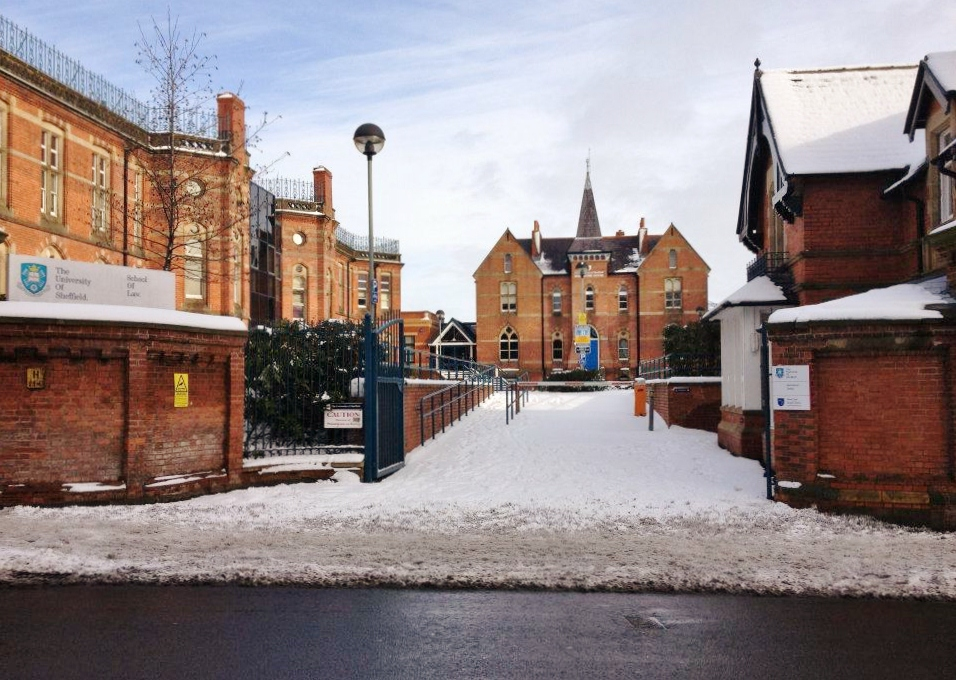
Bartolomé House, Sheffield Law School

Bartolomé House is a set of grade II-listed buildings on Winter Street, which house the School of Law at the University of Sheffield. It was designed by S. L. Swann in Gothic Revival style in red brick with ashlar dressings and slate roofs. Originally constructed in 1881 as the Winter Street Hospital for Infectious Diseases, it became a dedicated tuberculosis hospital in 1912, and was later the St George's Hospital for geriatric patients, which closed in 1990. After refurbishment it became the School of Nursing for the University of Sheffield in 1997. It was named Bartolomé House in 1998 after Dr Mariano Martin de Bartolomé, who was President of the Sheffield Medical School for 22 years in the 19th century. In 2008 it was taken over by the School of Law.

=== Other buildings ===
The Dainton Building, houses the Department of Chemistry and Faculty of Sciences, is named after Sheffield academic chemist and university chancellor Frederick Sydney Dainton. The East Wing of Dainton Building was renamed Richard Roberts Building after Nobel Laureate and University graduate Richard Roberts. The Dainton Building was opened by the Duke of Scarborough in the 1950s. The East Wing (Richard Roberts Building) was built in 1961, followed by the West Wing (Haworth Wing) in 1964, and the North Wing (Beaumont Wing) in 1968.

The Geography and Planning building is located next to Weston Park opposite Bartolomé House. It was designed as a cluster of hexagons in 1960, and is home to the departments of Geography, and Urban Studies and Planning.

== Buildings in the southern area ==
=== University House and Octagon Centre ===
The original University House was built in 1963, which is one of the first buildings with glass curtain walls in the world. The building complex was redesigned and refurbished by HLM architects between 2012 and 2013, and currently known, together with adjacent Link buildings, as the Students' Union Building.

The Octagon Centre is a multi-purpose conference centre and music venue situated at the Western Bank campus. The Octagon Centre comprises an eight-sided auditorium with a capacity of 1,600, offices, meeting rooms, and a lounge with bar and patio. The University Grants Committee agreed to construct a new oval shaped theatre in 1958 next to University House. The plan was suspended in 1963, and instead, the Drama Studio was refurbished from the former Glossop Road Baptist Church and opened in 1970 as a studio theatre. In 1981, the university had made plans to build a new premises and the Octagon Centre building was eventually opened in 1983. The Octagon Centre consists of a main auditorium known as the Convocation Hall, with offices and meeting rooms in corridors across two floors at a lower elevation on the southern side of the building, and a bar lounge. All of these areas are connected by a foyer entrance block. The building is connected to University House by a skyway, offering access to University House's catering facilities.

=== Hicks Building ===
The Hicks Building is a building named after William Mitchinson Hicks, a British mathematician and physicist who spent most of his career at Sheffield, contributing to the development of the university. It houses the departments of Physics and Astronomy, the Chemistry and Physics Workshop and the School of Mathematics and Statistics. The building is in three sections, including a taller building clad in red-brick, a shorter fully linked section clad in blue tiles and glass, and a section facing the University Concourse. It was built in the 1950s and re-clad in 2005.

=== Information Commons ===
The Information Commons (IC) is a library and computing building located within the Western Bank campus on Leavygreave Road. It was opened on 26 September 2007. The building is open to University of Sheffield staff and students 24 hours a day, 365 days a year. It houses over 1,300 study spaces, 500 computers, and 100,000 texts.

== See also ==
- University of Sheffield
