= Western Bank Library =

Library University of Sheffield

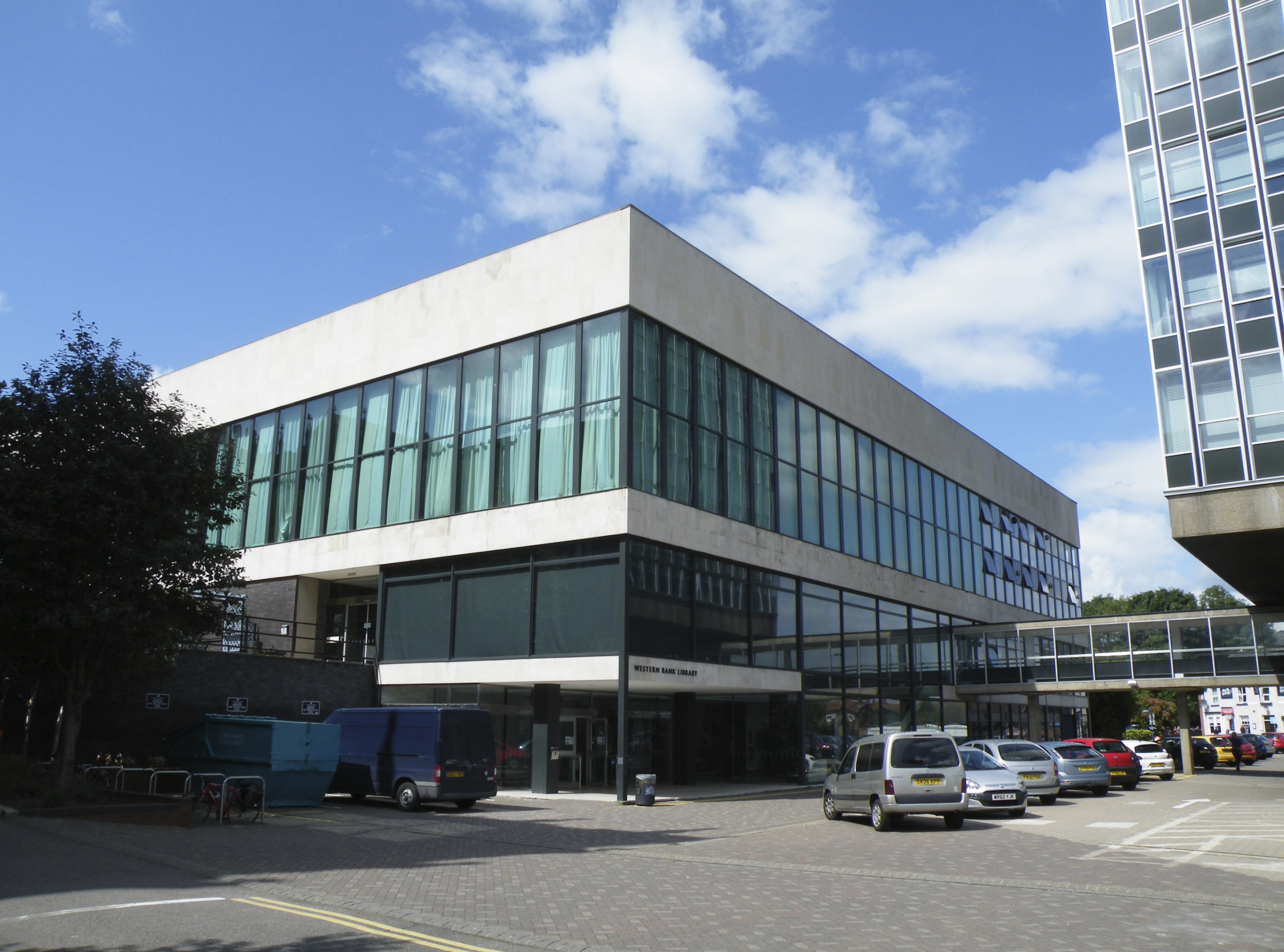
- Western Bank Library, connecting via a bridge to the Arts Tower (on the right)
- Interactive map of the Western Bank Library area

General information
- Type: Education
- Architectural style: Internationalism
- Location: Sheffield, United Kingdom
- Coordinates: 53.382642°N 1.488046°W
- Construction started: 1959
- Opened: 1959
- Owner: University of Sheffield

Technical details
- Floor count: 6

Design and construction
- Architect: Gollins Melvin Ward

Other information
- Public transit access: B Y University of Sheffield

Western Bank Library is a library at the University of Sheffield located on Western Bank, forming part of the Western Bank Campus. Formerly the Main Library, it is a Grade II* listed building opened in 1959 by Nobel prize-winning poet T. S. Eliot. The library was designed and built as a result of a national competition announced by the university in 1953. It was the university's main library until the Information Commons was opened in April 2007. Western Bank Library is linked to the Arts Tower (opened later in 1966) via a bridge between their mezzanine floors. The two buildings are intended to be viewed together according to their architect Gollins Melvin Ward.

The library has 730 study spaces. It is accessed by the ground floor entrance or via entrances on the mezzanine level.

== History ==
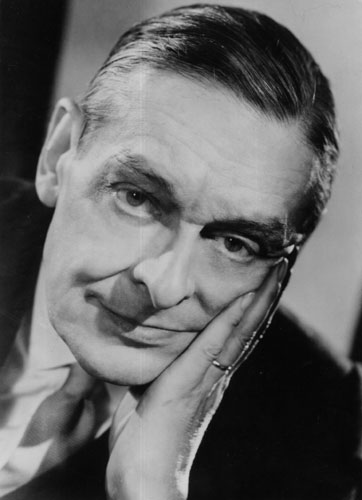
T. S. Eliot opened the Western Bank Library in 1959

With the growth of student numbers at the University of Sheffield following the Second World War, the old university library, Edgar Allen Library in Firth Court, was necessary to be replaced with a modern post-war era one. In 1953, the university held an innovative national competition for a new master plan for the Western Bank Campus, where entrants were required to design a new library capable of holding one million volumes. There were a total of 99 entries to the competition. An emerging London-based architectural practice Gollins Melvin Ward and Partners won with their design that sought a simple clean architecture with wide basic spans. Its cubic form was inspired by pioneer of modernist architecture Ludwig Mies van der Rohe, and was an attempt to unify the university campus despite the stark contrast between the pre-and post-war buildings.

On 12 May 1959, American-born British poet T. S. Eliot performed the opening ceremony of the Main Library. A higher degree ceremony was also conducted on that day within the reading room of the library, during which honorary degrees were awarded to Eliot and other notables including Stanley Peyton. In 1993, the Main Library acquired Grade II* listed status, along with the adjacent Arts Tower.

The University of Sheffield continued to expand in the 1990s, causing a shortage of study spaces for students within the university. The Main Library was however not easily extendable, and the spatial separation of library and IT services in the library was difficult to accommodate. A new library and computing center, Information Commons, was hence opened in 2007 to help to relieve pressure on the Main Library. This 1959 library was renamed Western Bank Library on 1 September 2007. In February 2010, the building was refurbished by Avanti Architects, restoring the previously obscured marble walls to its original form, and providing group study rooms and new study spaces.

== Architecture ==
Western Bank Library is built in post-war modernism style. The building is resolutely rectangular, with an exterior of stone facings and plate glass. Its interior is constructed of reinforced concrete and steel, with marble stairways. It has large glass curtain walls run through the length of its reading room, offering views north across Weston Park's lake and grounds. Western Bank Library was described as "the best modern building in Sheffield" by architecture historian Nikolaus Pevsner.

The library has a marble-walled Exhibition Gallery on the mezzanine level. The gallery was formally opened in 2010 after restoration with a grant of £184,000 from the Wolfson Foundation and other alumni foundation gifts. The Exhibition Gallery is open to the public during the library's opening hours. It displays items from the university's special collections and archive, as well as hosts visiting exhibitions. Past exhibitions include works and objects by showman P. T. Barnum, architect George Devey, artist Annie Bindon Carter, author Barry Hines and Sheffield's Nobel laureate Hans Krebs. The gallery also showcased the Department of Music's collection of historical musical instruments, and the university's fine press books.

== Holdings ==
The library holds 1.2 million texts for most subjects as well as 25,000 rare books and 150 special collections. It is also home to the university's Special Collections and the National Fairground and Circus Archive.

== See also ==
- Arts Tower
- Western Bank Campus
