= Forge FM =

Volunteer radio station

Coordinates: 53°22′50.4″N 1°29′15.4″W

Forge FM logo

Forge FM was a youth-led community radio station and educational charity in Sheffield in the 1990s. Run by volunteers, the station brought together a wide range of specialist music shows and speech-based programming with the aim of involving all members of the community.

== History ==
Originally the Radio and TV Society (RTVS) formed in 1991 at the Sheffield University Students Union (at the time known as SUSU), the name Forge was chosen through a competition prior to the first 28-day RSL broadcast in October 1992. A second broadcast was made from the Union in October 1993.

In 1994 the Student Union withdrew their support following reports that Forge's activities were no longer student orientated. The organisation moved to a new home in Sheffield's Cultural Industries Quarter. Forge was now an independent entity comprising a registered educational charity (Forge FM, charity number 1039396) and a registered company (02825116 Forge FM Trading Ltd). Funding from grants was used to run a series of courses in radio production. The long-term goal of the organisation was to become a full-time community radio station for Sheffield.

Forge continued to produce annual 28-day broadcasts and also collaborated with the Northern Media School at Sheffield Hallam University to produce broadcasts for the Sheffield Children's Festival as Festival FM.

The long-term goal was never realised – in 2000 The charity was removed from the Charities Register and the trading company was dissolved.

== Successors ==
- Forge Radio – The current student radio station at The University of Sheffield
- Sheffield Live – a full-time community radio station broadcasting to Sheffield
