= Drama Studio =

Drama Studio may refer to:

- Drama Studio London, a drama school in Ealing, England
- Drama Studio, University of Sheffield, a theatre venue in Sheffield, England
