= Alfred Denny Building =

Coordinates: 53.38165°N 1.487432°W

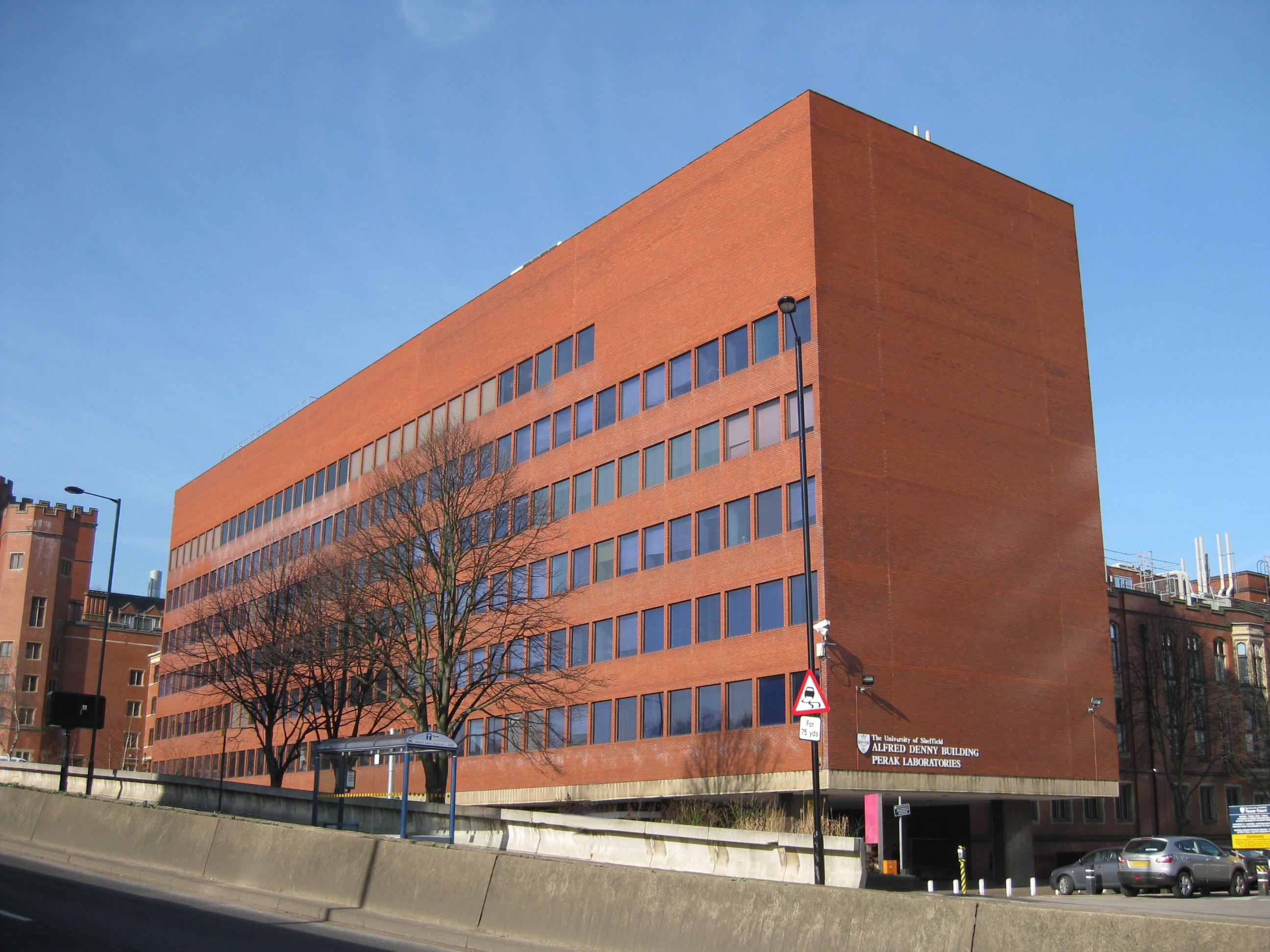
- The Alfred Denny Building, viewed from Western Bank.
- Interactive map of the Alfred Denny Building area

General information
- Type: Education
- Location: Sheffield, Yorkshire
- Completed: 1971

Height
- Height: 35 m (115 ft)

Technical details
- Floor count: 7

Other information
- Public transit access: B Y University of Sheffield

The Alfred Denny Building is a 7-storey red brick building in Sheffield, England named after the first Professor of Zoology at the department. It is part of the Western Bank Campus of the University of Sheffield, linked to Firth Court via the Addison Building.

== Contents ==
The building itself houses the University of Sheffield's Departments of Biomedical Science and Animal & Plant Science including its associated museum. It also houses the Perak Laboratories, used by students reading degrees from Medicine to Bioengineering, a computer centre, several lecture theatres and the Hillsborough Centre, for disabled and dyslexic students.

Axordia, a university spinout company dealing with human embryonic stem cells (hESC), also works out of the building although their offices are in the Sheffield Bioincubator.

== History ==
Originally planned as the Administrative Building, but later revised to be the Biology Building, it was part of major redevelopment of the site from 1957, and building commenced in 1965. However the announcement that the University Grants Committee would provide no further funds from 1966 delayed this and other projects. It was completed in stages in 1971, using the same red bricks as the 1905 buildings close by.

Alfred Denny was a professor at Firth College who became the first professor of biology of the university in 1905, when he started a museum of biology in Firth Court. This grew and was named the Alfred Denny Museum in 1950. It was later relocated to the new Biology Building and in 1990 the building was renamed the Alfred Denny Building.

== In Praise of Air ==
From May 2014 to January 2016 the south wall was used to display a poem "In Praise of Air" by Simon Armitage, on a specially treated cloth which it is claimed destroyed certain pollutants by catalytic oxidation. It was estimated that two tons had been removed from the air in this way.

== See also ==
- Firth Court
- Western Bank Campus
