= University House =

University House may refer to:

- University House (Auckland), New Zealand
- University House, Australian National University
- University House, Berkeley
- University House, Newcastle, New South Wales
- University House, University of Birmingham
- University House, University of Sheffield
- University House, University of East London
- University House, University of Lancaster
