= Octagon Centre =

Multi-purpose venue in England

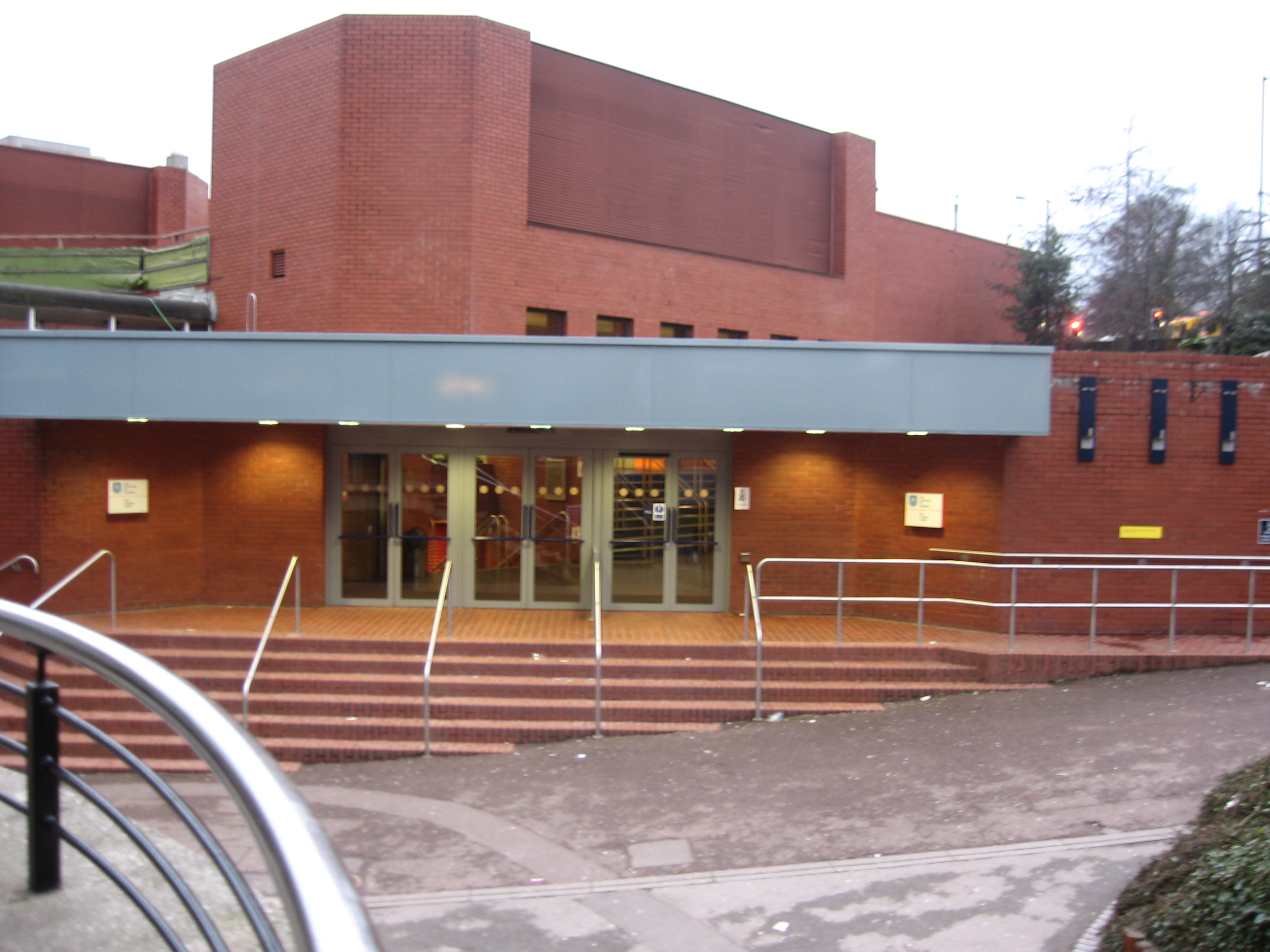
- Octagon Centre main entrance
- Interactive map of Octagon Centre
- Address: University of Sheffield, Octagon Centre, Western Bank, Sheffield S10 2TQ.
- Location: Sheffield
- Coordinates: 53.3807°N 1.4887°W
- Owner: University of Sheffield
- Public transit: B Y University of Sheffield

Construction
- Opened: 1983
- Construction cost: £1.75 m

Website
- Official website

The Octagon Centre, built in 1983, is a multi-purpose conference centre and music venue at the University of Sheffield, England. Situated in the Western Bank campus, it is joined by a skyway to University House and comprises an eight-sided auditorium with a capacity of 1,800 (1,230 seated), offices, meeting rooms, and a lounge with bar and patio.

The Octagon is used for a variety of purposes, including examinations, lectures, graduation ceremonies, conferences, music concerts and club nights.

== History ==
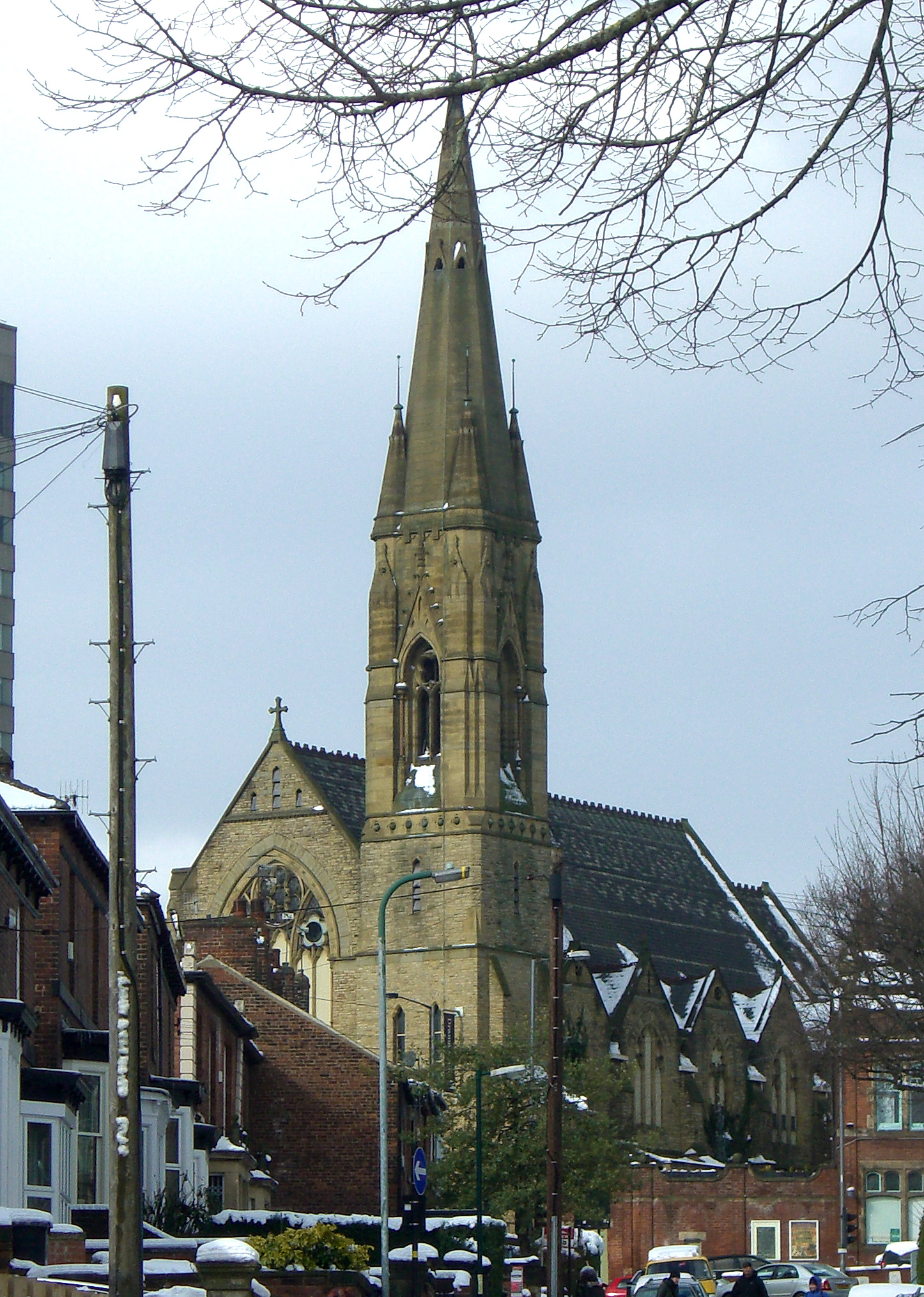
Drama Studio

In 1958 the University Grants Committee agreed to allocate a sum of £175,000 for the construction of a new oval shaped theatre, which would have been built next to University House and was predicted to be completed for 1965. By early 1963, the funding was revoked because a theatre building was no longer considered a priority for the university given other pressures arising from construction underway at the time. Eventually, the Drama Studio opened on a nearby site in 1970, which was considered something of a compromise. The university was later offered the empty premises of JG Graves Limited, opposite the Western Bank building. Despite initial plans to convert it for use by the Biology department, the building was demolished. The site was used as the Clarkson Street car park until the Octagon Centre construction began in 1982.

By 1981 the university had made plans to build a new venue at a cost of £1.75 million, which was considered to be inappropriate expenditure at a time of tight funding. The plans were criticised by the Association of University Teachers and the local press at the time. The building was initially planned as an extension to the students' union, but due to the financial stake provided by the university an arrangement was made to share the use of the building between the union and the university, in exchange for student union control of parts of University House.

The building was opened in 1983 under the management of Stephen Ware and contributed to Sheffield being listed as one of the top ten conference towns in the UK by Conference Britain in 1985. The Social Democrat Party held a conference there in 1988 and degree congregations moved there from Sheffield City Hall in 1984.

== Architecture ==
The Octagon Centre consists of a main auditorium known as the Convocation Hall to the north, with offices and meeting rooms in corridors across two floors at a lower elevation on the southern side of the building. There is also a bar lounge on the south side of the hall (at the hall's elevation); all of these areas are connected by a foyer entrance block. The Convocation Hall has a diameter of approximately 32 m on the East-West axis, covers an area of 870 m^{2} and has a capacity of 1,230 seated or 1,800 standing. The building is connected to University House by a sky walkway, offering access to University House's catering facilities. The centre offers five meeting rooms to clients with the following outline capacities:

Room	Lecture style capacity	Meeting capacity
Council Chamber	80	36
TV Lounge	40	18
Meeting Room 1	40	20
Meeting Room 2	30	16
Meeting Room 3	30	16

== Events ==
The Octagon Centre has hosted live music concerts from a number of notable bands as part of the touring music circuit in the UK, such as Nirvana on 28 November 1991 and Oasis in 1994. The Students' Union hosts nightclub and live music events in the Octagon. In 2006 Eddie Izzard received an honorary doctorate in Letters at a graduation ceremony in the Octagon Centre.

== Transport ==
Location of the Octagon Centre within Sheffield and the UK.

=== Road ===
The Octagon Centre is situated on the A57 near its western intersection with the A61, junction 6 of the Sheffield Inner Ring Road. Access from the north and north-east of the country is provided by the M1 and M18, with routes from the south served by the M1 and A61. Access from the west is served by the A57 Snake Pass, alternatively using the A628 Woodhead pass in poor winter weather conditions. Although there are a number of car parking spaces around the university, car parking can often be limited, so the university recommend using park and ride services or planning car parking in advance.

=== Bus ===
A number of bus routes serve the area around the university, with routes H1, 30, 30A, 51, 52, 70, 120, 272, 273, 274, 275 and 505 serving the nearest stops to the Octagon Centre.

=== Tram ===
The Octagon Centre is a short walk from the University of Sheffield tram stop, which is served by the Blue and Yellow lines of the South Yorkshire Supertram to destinations including Sheffield station, Hillsborough, Malin Bridge, Halfway and Meadowhall Interchange.

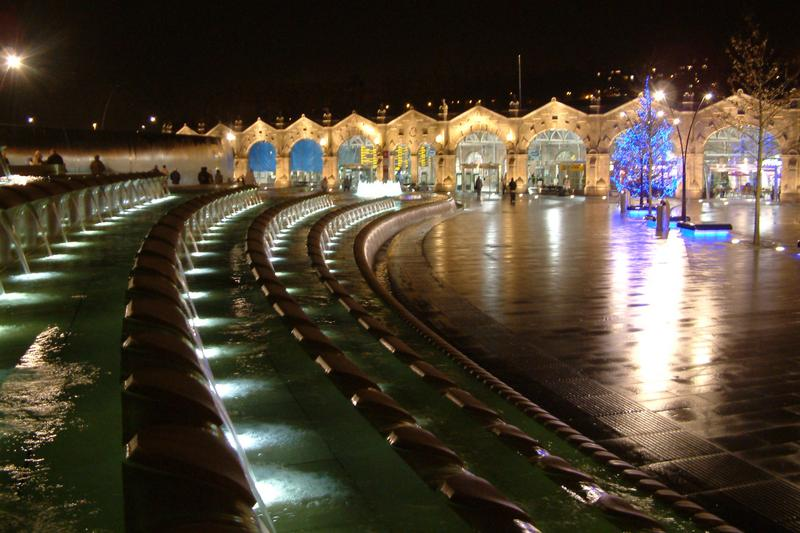
Sheffield railway station

=== Rail ===
The nearest rail station is Sheffield station, connecting it to local destinations by Northern and TransPennine Express services, with intercity services operated by CrossCountry and East Midlands Railway. Sheffield station is just over two hours away from London St Pancras and one hour from Leeds, Manchester and Nottingham. There is a direct connection to the Supertram network at the station via an overbridge, which allows onward travel to the Octagon Centre via the University of Sheffield tram stop.

=== Air ===
Nearby airports

The nearest international airport is Doncaster Sheffield, approximately 30 minutes away by car. Other nearby international airports include Manchester, Leeds Bradford and East Midlands Airport. Manchester has a direct rail link to Sheffield and London Heathrow and London Gatwick are connected to Sheffield by rail with one change of train, approximately four hours away.

== See also ==
- University of Sheffield
- University of Sheffield Students' Union
- University House
- Drama Studio
