= Compound arch =

Architectural feature

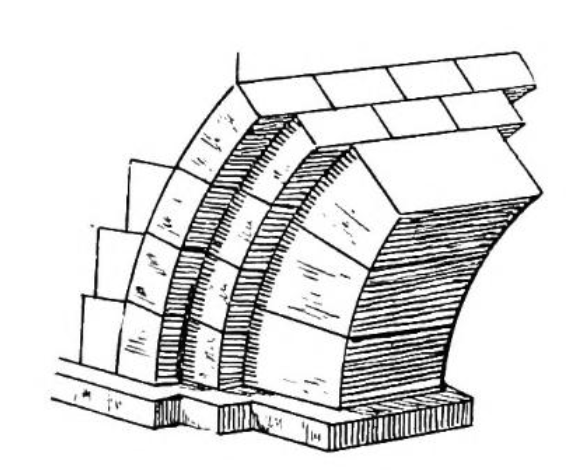
Part of a compound arch with three recessed orders

A compound arch is an arch built using multiple independent sub-arches stacked vertically, with their arcs of voussoirs placed one on the top of the other. The goal of using a compound arch is usually to increase the overall strength and reliability (if only one sub-arch is fractured, the structure still stands). Each of these sub-arches, or "rings", of which the whole compound arch is composed, is called an arch order. In some compound orders their faces are in the same plane. But as a rule the orders are successively recessed (recessed orders), i.e. the innermost sub-arch, or order, is narrow, the next above it broader, the next is broader still, and so on.

== History ==
This system of concentric arches was employed by the Romans early in the 6th century BC, in the Cloaca Maxima at Rome; three orders were used where the Cloaca enters the Tiber. In the Anglo-Saxon architecture the use dates at least to the late 8th century (All Saints' Church, Brixworth with two concentric orders made of Roman bricks). The older compound arches were built from semicircular segments, but later the pointed arches were also compounded, for example, to form the west door portal of the Assumption of Blessed Mary and St Nicholas church in Etchingham (14th century). The early French example is the church of Saint-Philbert-de-Grand-Lieu.

== Recessed orders ==
The recessed orders were also known in Ancient Rome (Arles Amphitheatre, 90 AD, Trier Imperial Baths, 4th century AD). They can be found in Hagia Sophia (537 AD), Basilica of Sant'Apollinare in Classe (also 6th century). Romanesque and Gothic architects clearly preferred the recessed orders; this can be partially explained by the desire to save on expensive ashlar (the core of thick walls and of the widest outer order could then be filled with cheap rubble.

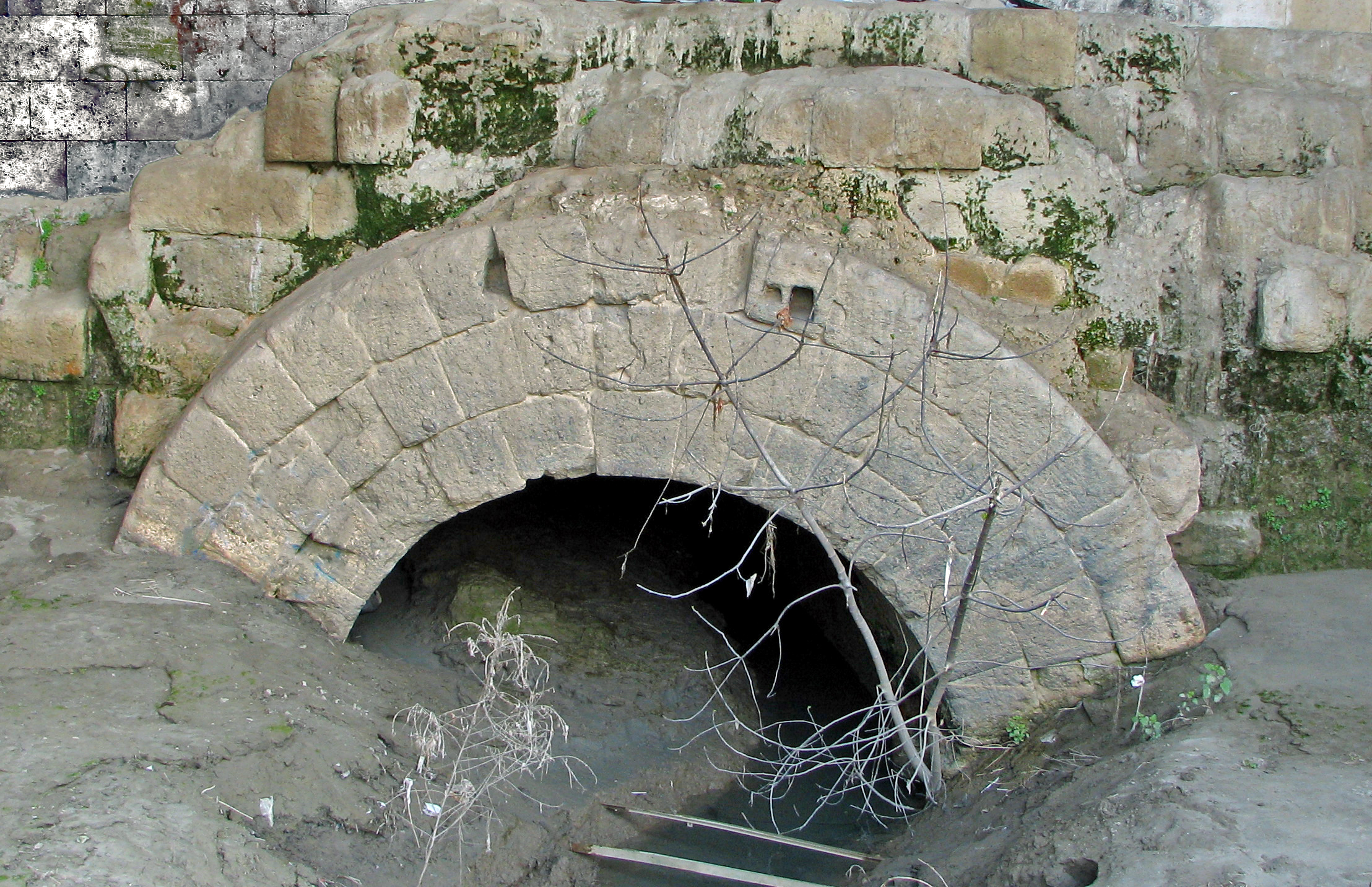
Cloaka Maxima near Ponte Palatino

Norman architecture doorway of four orders (St Margaret's Church, York)

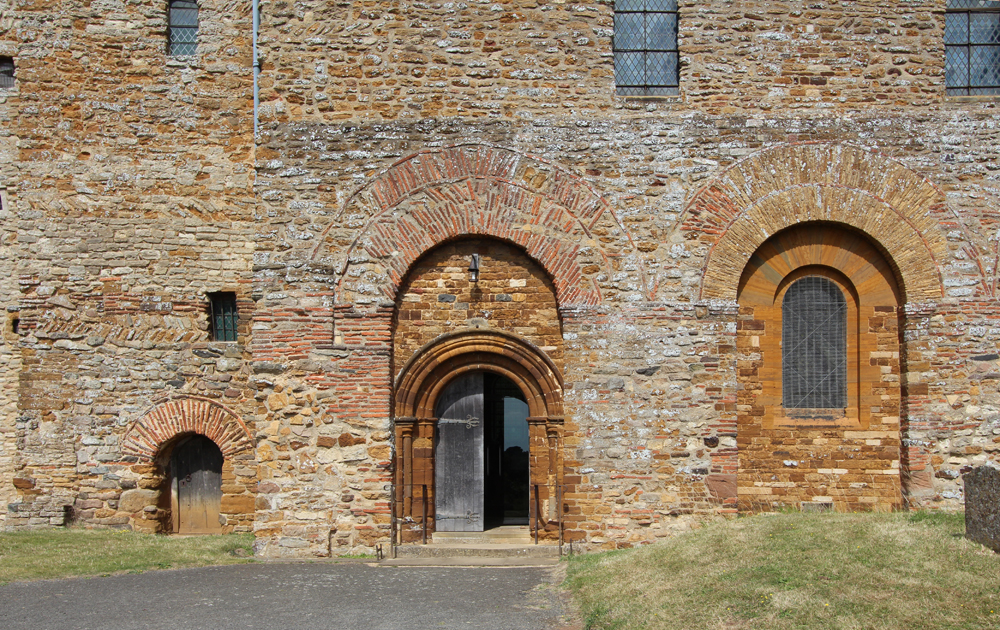
All Saints' Church, Brixworth

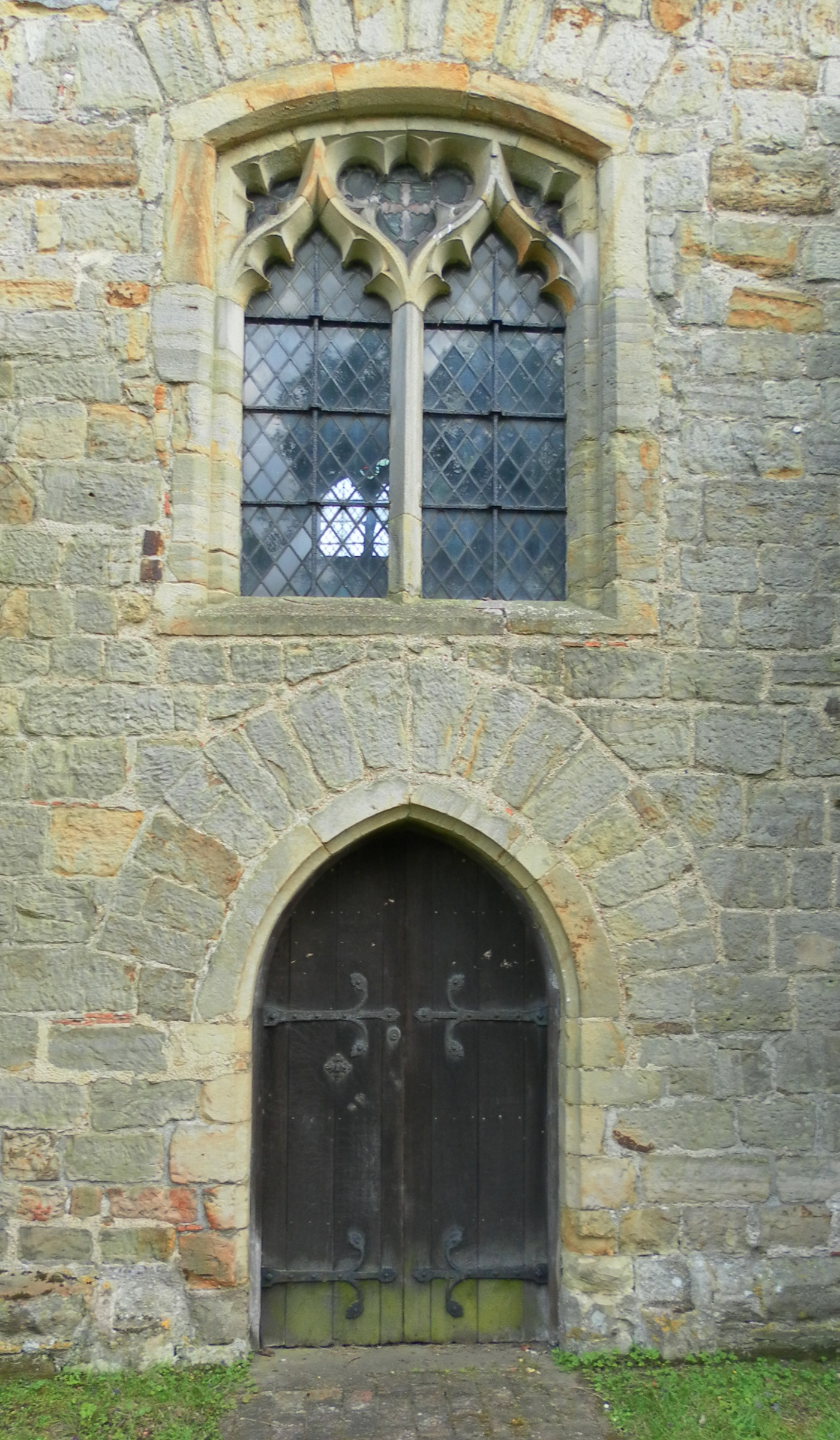
Church of the Assumption and St Nicholas, Etchingham

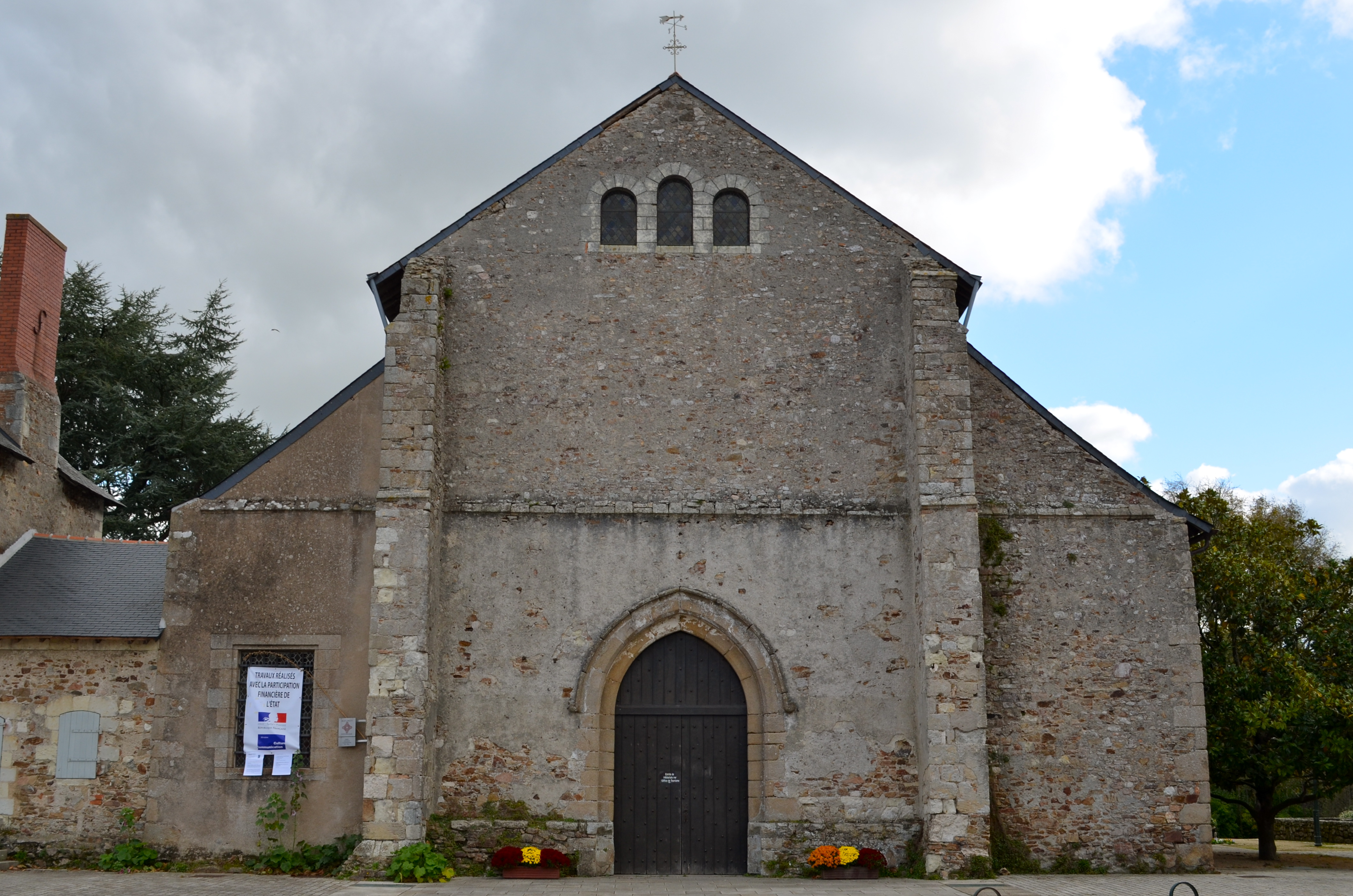
Church of Saint-Philbert-de-Grand-Lieu

== See also ==
- Compound pier / Clustered column

== Sources ==
- Bond, Francis (1905). Gothic Architecture in England: An Analysis of the Origin & Development of English Church Architecture from the Norman Conquest to the Dissolution of the Monasteries. B. T. Batsford.
