= Pier (architecture) =

Upright support in arches or bridges

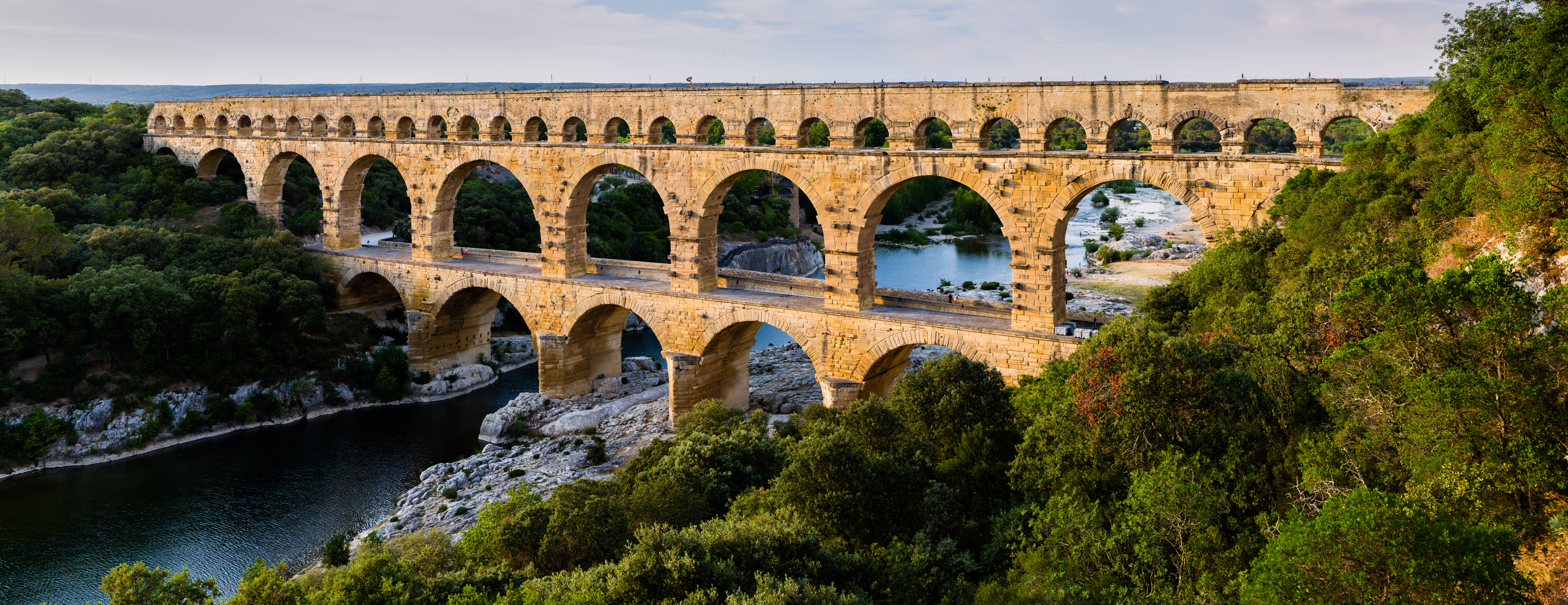
The Pont du Gard (c.19 BC), Nîmes; 3 rows of piers with arches springing from them to support the bridge

A pier, in architecture, is an upright support for a structure or superstructure such as an arch or bridge. Sections of structural walls between openings (bays) can function as piers. External or free-standing walls may have piers at the ends or on corners.

== Description ==
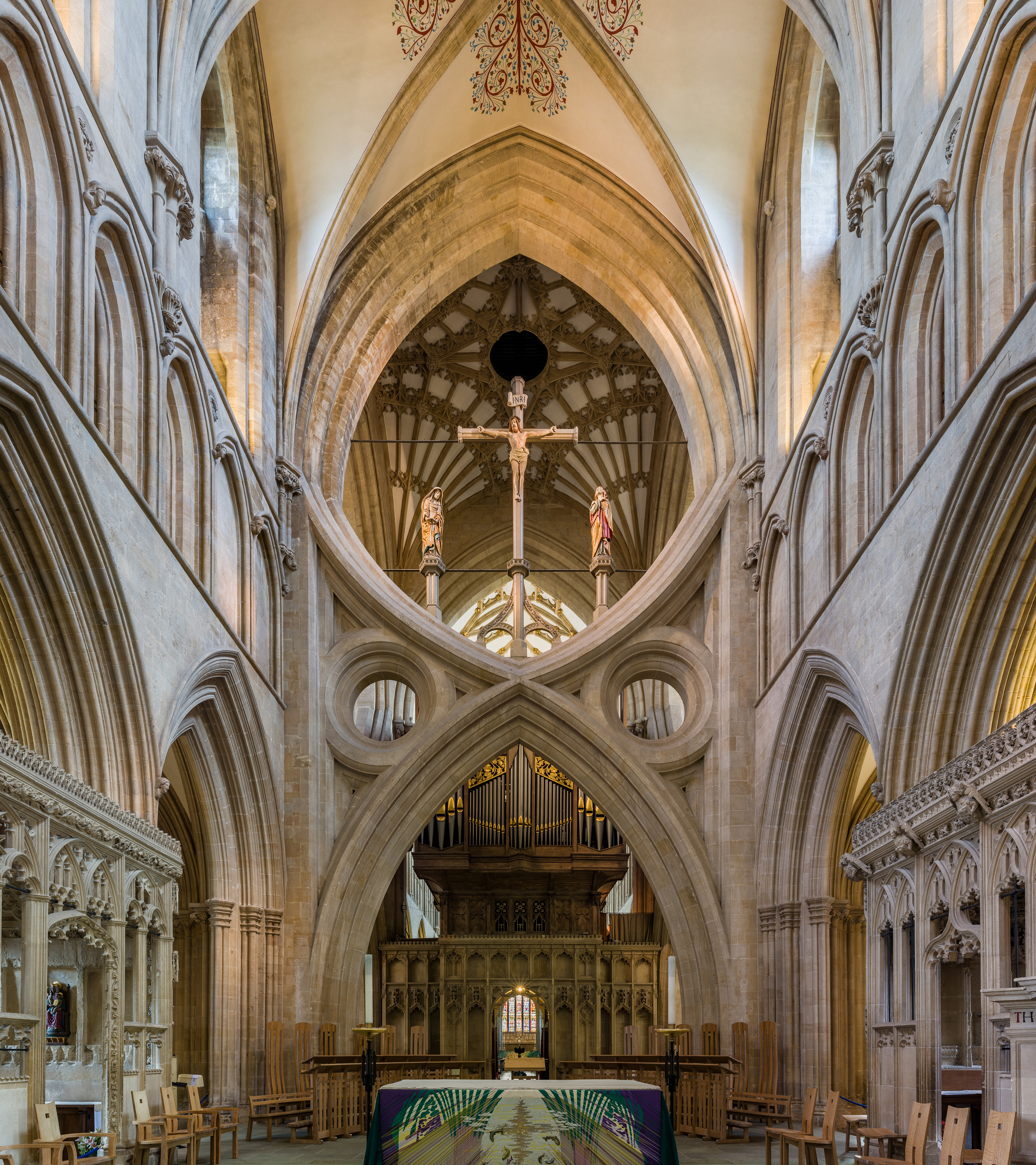
Cruciform pier in Wells Cathedral, England

The simplest cross section of the pier is square, or rectangular, but other shapes are also common. In medieval architecture, massive circular supports called drum piers, cruciform (cross-shaped) piers, and compound piers are common architectural elements.

Columns are a similar upright support, but stand on a round base; in many contexts columns may also be called piers. In buildings with a sequence of bays between piers, each opening (window or door) between two piers is considered a single bay.

== Bridge piers ==
Single-span bridges have abutments at each end that support the weight of the bridge and serve as retaining walls to resist lateral movement of the earthen fill of the bridge approach. Multi-span bridges require piers to support the ends of spans between these abutments. In cold climates, the upstream edge of a pier may include a starkwater to prevent accumulation of broken ice during peak snowmelt flows. The starkwater has a sharpened upstream edge sometimes called a cutwater. The cutwater edge may be of concrete or masonry, but is often capped with a steel angle to resist abrasion and focus force at a single point to fracture floating pieces of ice striking the pier. In cold climates, the starkwater is typically sloped at an angle of about 45° so current pushing against the ice tends to lift the downstream edge of the ice translating horizontal force of the current to vertical force against a thinner cross-section of ice until unsupported weight of ice fractures the piece of ice allowing it to pass on either side of the pier.

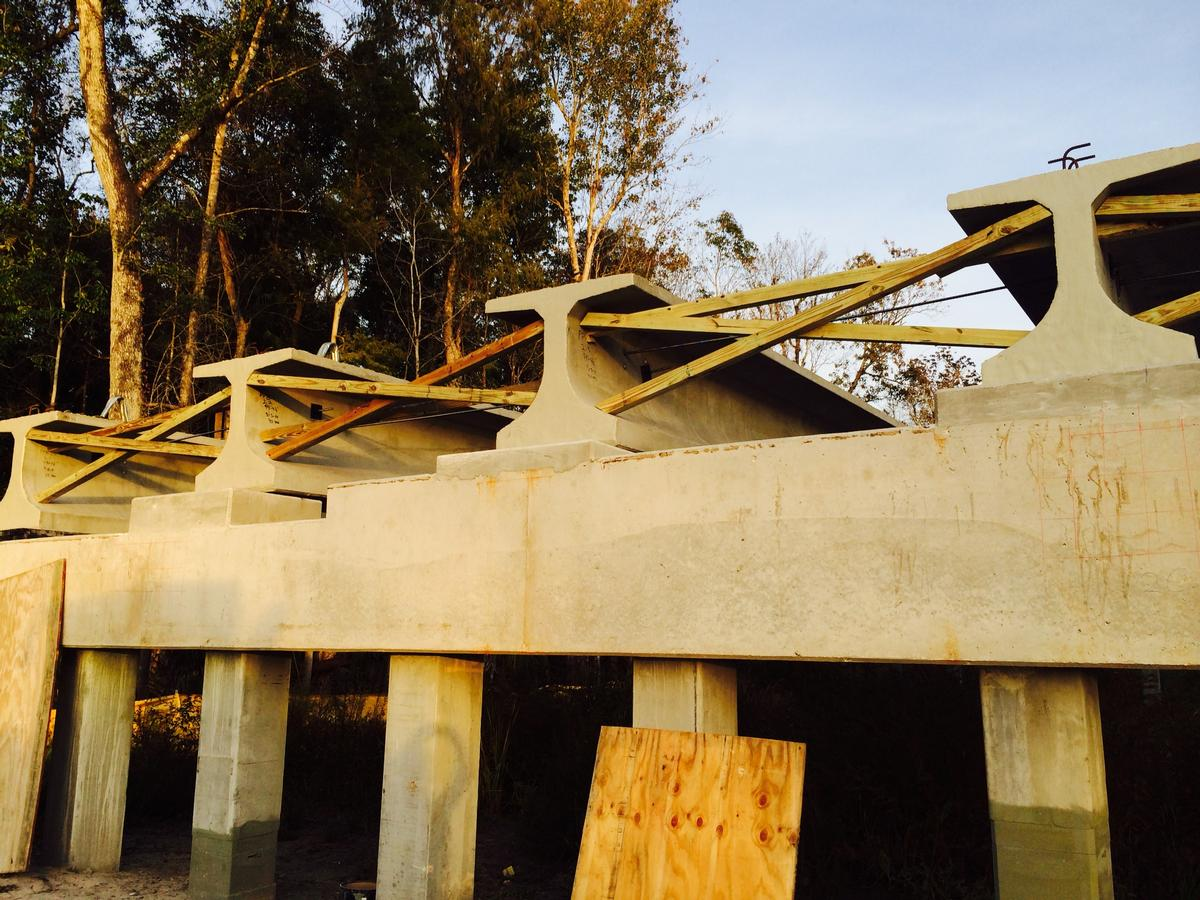
A concrete girder bridge pier during construction prior to installation of the bridge deck and parapets, consisting of multiple angled pylons for support (bottom), a horizontal concrete cap (center), and girders (top) with temporary wood bracing

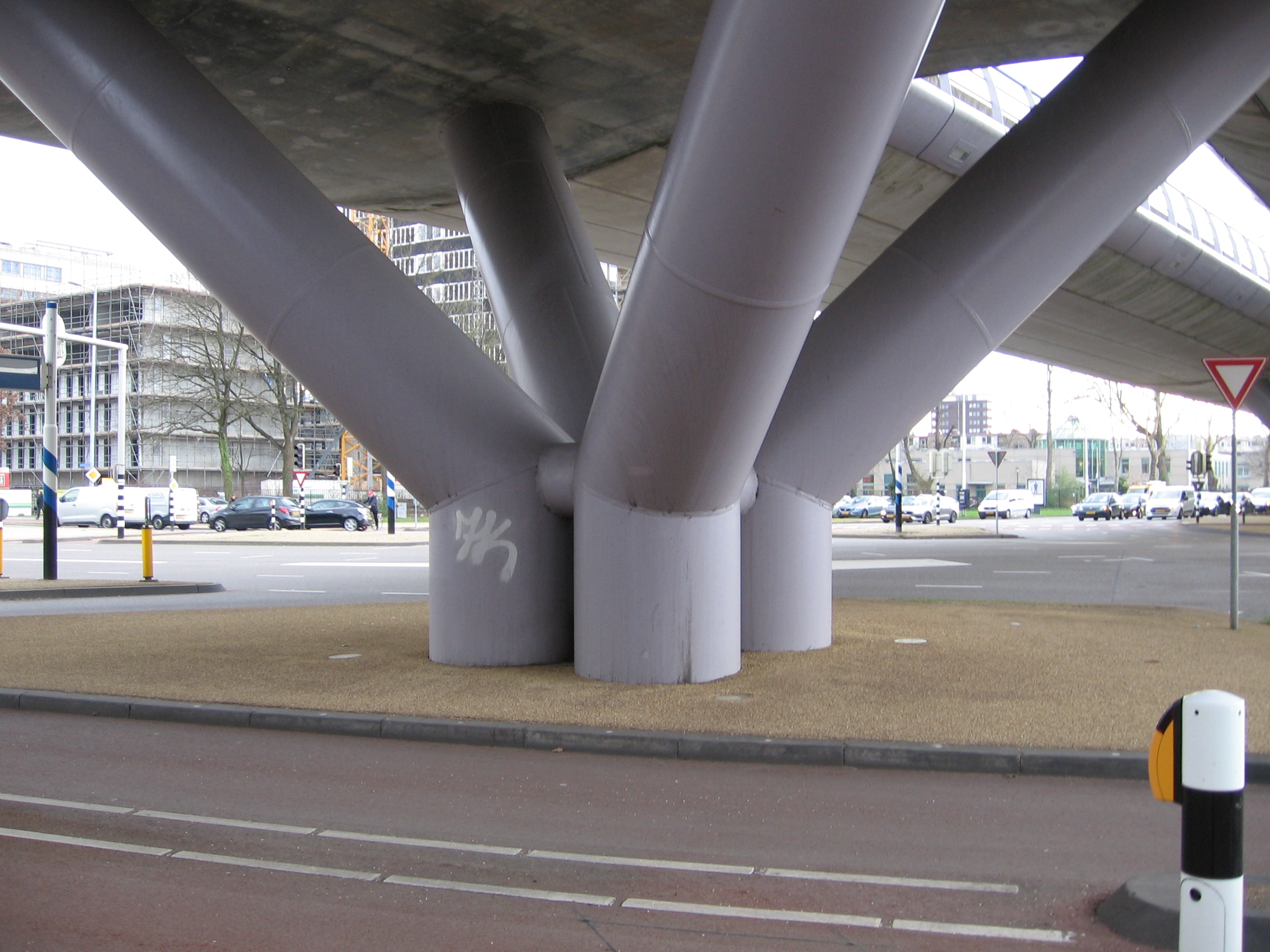
A quadruple compound pier supporting the fly-over at the traffic junction 24 Oktoberplein (Utrecht, Netherlands)

== Examples ==
The Arc de Triomphe, Paris, supported by four massive planar piers

In the Arc de Triomphe, Paris (photo, adjascent) the central arch and side arches are raised on four massive planar piers.

=== St Peter's Basilica ===
Bramante's plan for St Peter's Basilica. In this illustration, the piers are rendered in solid black. Double lines between the piers indicate vaulting.

Donato Bramante's original plan for St Peter's Basilica in Rome has richly articulated piers. Four piers support the weight of the dome at the central crossing. These piers were found to be too small to support the weight and were changed later by Michelangelo to account for the massive weight of the dome.

The piers of the four apses that project from each outer wall are also strong, to withstand the outward thrust of the half-domes upon them. Many niches articulate the wall-spaces of the piers.

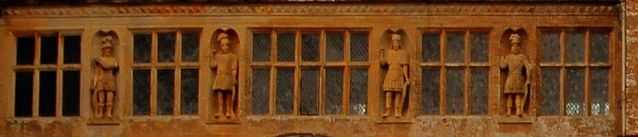
Montacute House (England, c. 1598). Niches in the piers of the long gallery are occupied by statues of the Nine Worthies.

== See also ==
- Column — pillar
- Compound pier
- Deep foundation
- Pilaster
