= Forge Media =

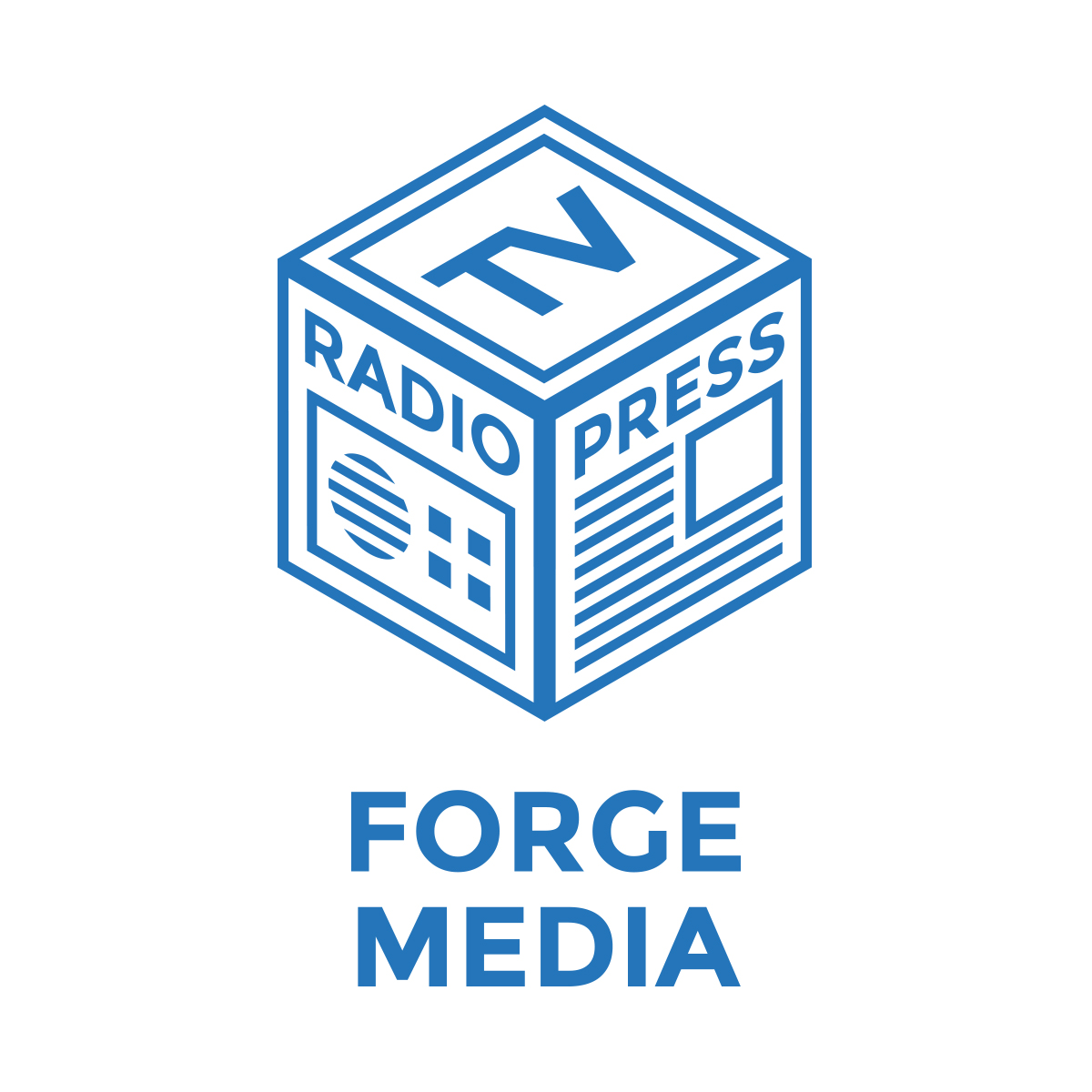
Forge Media Combined Logo

Forge Media is the collective term for the three student-run organisations at the University of Sheffield Students' Union who create student media. Forge Media has consisted of Forge Radio, Forge TV and Forge Press since 2008. On 4 July 2012, Forge Media was named Best Student Media at the NUS Awards. The award recognised the many hours of hard work put in by the members of the Forge Press, Forge Radio and Forge TV teams, as individual teams and as one fully converged media package, displaying a wide range of multimedia skills and including hundreds of members of the student body, and reaching large audiences.

== Forge Radio ==
Forge Radio
- Sheffield; United Kingdom

Programming
- Language: English
- Format: Music
- Affiliations: Student Radio Association; Community Media Association; University of Sheffield

History
- First air date: 1995
- Former names: Sure Radio

Links
- Webcast: p.onlineradiobox.com/uk/forge/player/?played=1&cs=uk.forge

Forge Radio (formerly named Sure Radio from 1995-2008) is the student radio station of the University of Sheffield. It broadcasts during term time on the Internet and throughout the Students' Union, catering for a varied taste in music and general interest with programming produced by other university societies.

Forge Radio was founded (under the name of Sure Radio) in 1995 as a student society at Sheffield Union by Helen Grimes, with Jenny Thornton as Head of Music. The station followed in the footsteps of Forge FM; a station jointly run by students and the local community broadcasting from University House, which moved out of the students' union to become an independent organisation in 1994. The original aim of Sure Radio was to broadcast 4-week FM "RSL" broadcasts twice a year, and to become a self-sufficient organisation. It broadcast to the city of Sheffield, and to travellers driving along a small stretch of the M1.

In 2000, Sure FM was awarded Student Radio Station of the Year by College Music Update, with Dan Morfitt also being nominated as Best Head of Music. Later that year, Dan also received a nomination at the Student Radio Awards. Sure then made the national news in February 2001, including ITN's News at Ten and BBC Radio One's Newsbeat, for being banned from playing any music by Eminem by the University of Sheffield Union of Students. Although not broadcasting at the time of the controversy, Sure took the unilateral step of breaking the ban during its next broadcast on FM, for which it was duly fined by the Union.

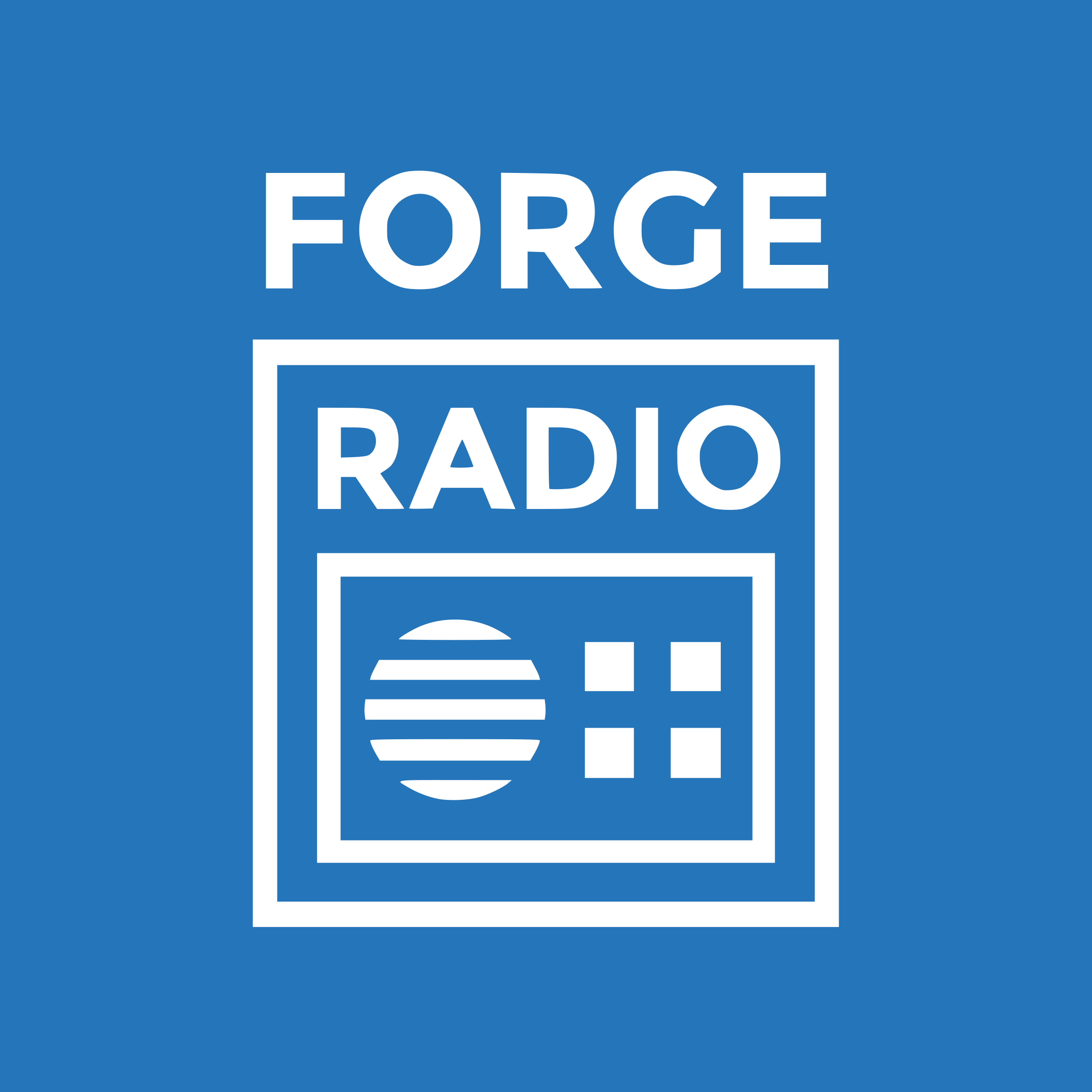
Forge Radio Logo

In association with the Students' Union, Sure moved into a new media hub built for the three divisions of media: Sure Radio, The Steel Press and Sheffield Base in 2008.

In June 2009, Forge Radio as a part of Forge Media were the runners up in the category of Student Media of the Year at the NUS Awards 2009. In October 2009, Jen Carr (Head of Music 2008/09, Station Manager 2009/10) was nominated for Best Female Presenter at the Student Radio Awards, in the process gaining the station's first nomination at the awards since Oli Q back in 2005. A year later, the station received two nominations with Dale Wetter gaining a nomination for Best Male Presenter and Sam Moir for Best Specialist Music Programming.

The success of this year was recognised on several occasions; the station was awarded 'Best Working Committee' by the Students' Union, as well as receiving a nomination in the category of Best Student Radio Chart Show at the Student Radio Awards. Furthermore, Forge Media as a whole won the award for Best Student Media at the 2012 National Union of Students Awards. Forge Radio won two SRA awards in 2023; Connor Begley won The Joe Lyons Award for Best Producer Gold Award, Jake Kalender won the award for Best Technical Achievement.

== Forge TV ==
Forge TV
- Country: United Kingdom
- Broadcast area: Youtube
- Affiliates: University of Sheffield; Sheffield Students' Union; NaSTA

History
- Launched: September 2009

Links
- Website: www.youtube.com/@ForgeTelevision

Forge TV is the Student television station of the University of Sheffield. It now broadcasts live on YouTube during Varsity and SU elections alongside other sports broadcasts such as Sheffield Hatters Basketball. Forge TV also produce one of specials such as their adaptation of Taskmaster. It used to broadcast during term time on the Internet and throughout the Students' Union, catering for a varied taste in music, sport, culture and student programming.

Forge TV won the award for Most Improved Committee at the Sheffield SU's 2023 Societies and Activities awards.

== Forge Press ==
Forge Press
- Type: Monthly newspaper
- Format: Tabloid
- Owner: University of Sheffield
- Editor: Charles Fenton
- Founded: 1950 (as DARTS)
- Headquarters: University of Sheffield Union of Students, Western Bank, S10 2TG.
- Website: forgepress.org

Forge Press is the University of Sheffield's student newspaper. Published monthly during term-time by a team of up to 100 student volunteers, the paper has a circulation of 2,500 and is distributed free across campus and the surrounding student area to a projected readership of 15,000–20,000. Since 2003 the University of Sheffield Union of Students has employed a non-student in a support role which holds no editorial power and is designed to aid the day-to-day running of the organisation. In 2006 this role was expanded, retitled to 'Media Development Officer', to support all student media and any student or society who wants to use the Media Hub facilities.

The University of Sheffield has a history of student journalism that predates its inception as a university when it received its charter in 1905. Following the Second World War, a new newspaper was set up at the university called Darts, The name stemmed from a sister arts publication, Arrows, which had been around since the 1930s, with the new venture seen as a smaller entity than its sibling – a dart being a sort of miniature arrow. (The paper was ultimately to outlive its brethren, which closed in the late 1980s.) In the 1997/98 academic year a new editorial team took charge of Darts and decided to change the name. In the present day, Darts is the name of the part of the Comment section which provides a satirical and comical take on recent news stories and events.

On 28 November 1997 the newly rebranded Steel Press was unveiled. In style the paper was not particularly different from what had come before, yet over the following nine years underwent many changes. Ranging in appearance from something not dissimilar to the Daily Express to its eventual appearance as the Daily Mirror of student publications, the Sheffield Steel Press as it was known (Sheffield Steel as it appeared on the cover) continued to provide a proving ground for young journalists hoping for a career in the media or simply looking for an interesting diversion during their time at the University of Sheffield. In 2008, Sheffield Steel Press merged with Sure Radio and the website to make a fully converged student media called Forge Media. This consists of the newspaper Forge Press, Forge Radio and ForgeToday.com, as well as the more recent Forge TV.

In 2022, Forge Press was shortlisted for Best Publication at the 2022 Student Publication Association National Conference, which they hosted along with the Student Publication Association. The eventual winner of the award was the University of Manchester's, The Mancunion.
