= Firth Court =

Coordinates: 53.381314°N 1.488556°W

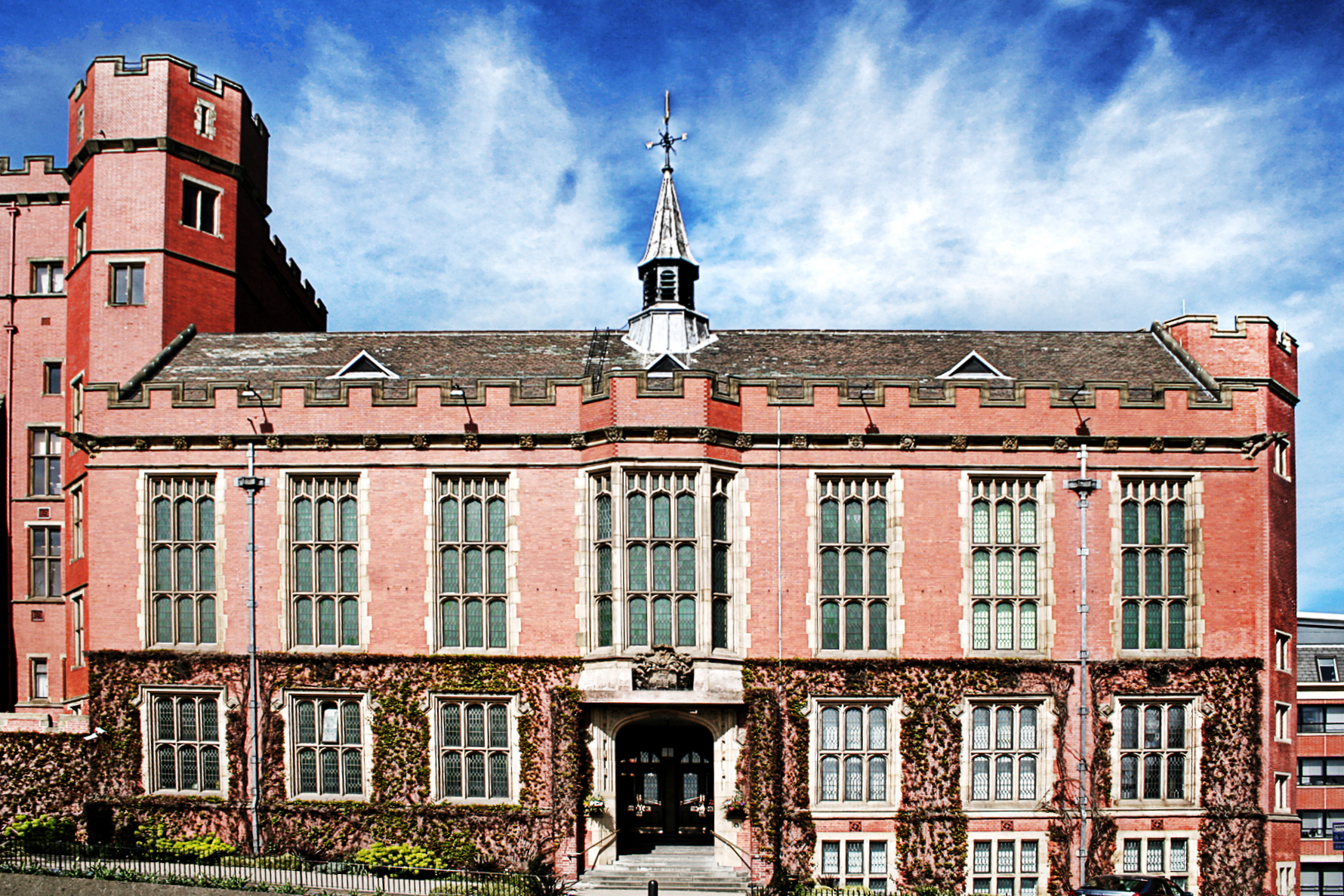
- Firth Court, viewed from Western Bank
- Interactive map of the Firth Court area

General information
- Type: Education
- Architectural style: Perpendicular Revival
- Location: Sheffield, South Yorkshire
- Completed: 1905

Height
- Height: 35m

Technical details
- Floor count: Between 5 and 10 (see text)

Other information
- Public transit access: B Y University of Sheffield

Firth Court is a Grade II listed Edwardian red-brick building that forms part of the Western Bank Campus of the University of Sheffield in the United Kingdom. Located on the northern side of Western Bank, it is the main administrative centre for the university and also houses the School of Biosciences.

The main entrance to Firth Court is on floor C, from this point up there are four complete floors (up to F floor which houses the first of the Molecular Biology and Biotechnology lecture theatres (F2) and research labs) and then G floor which is divided into several sections (housing the second lecture theatre (G2) and seminar rooms). This gives the five floors sometimes quoted, however the department's nuclear magnetic resonance (NMR) facility extends downwards from floor C and is housed on B (which is ground level at the back of the building), A and a further floor below this which has no official designation. In places the building extends above G floor, these towers do not have official floor letters but extend to what would be I floor. Counted from the bottom of the NMR pit to the highest research laboratory (that of Milton Wainwright) Firth court is 10 floors. The Main Block of Firth Court is linked, via the Addison Building, to the Alfred Denny Building. The Edwardian Block also links the North Block to the Perak Laboratories.

== History ==
in 1904, the people of Sheffield including steelworkers, coal miners and factory workers donated over £50,000 (now equivalent to over £15 million) to help found the University of Sheffield. Firth Court is the first purpose-built building for the university, which was designed by Sheffield-born architect Edward Mitchel Gibbs (1847-1935) and was built between 1903 and 1905. The building, then known as the Western Bank Building, was opened by King Edward VII and Queen Alexandra in July 1905, two months after the University of Sheffield was granted its Royal Charter on 31 May 1905 and officially came into being. The building originally housed the university's Arts, Science and Medicine departments. It is named after Sheffield steel manufacturer Mark Firth who played a key role in the university's early development.

== The Rotunda ==
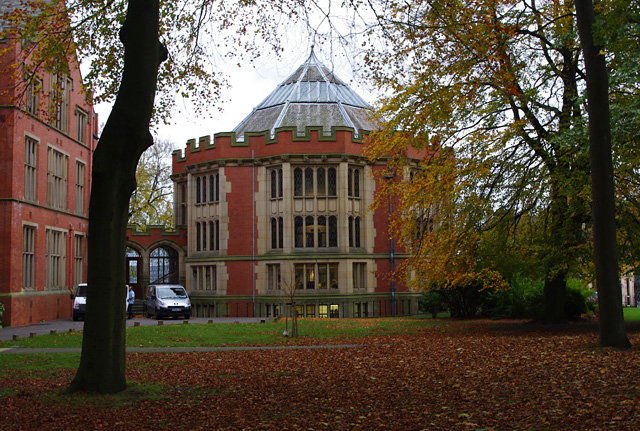
The Rotunda was opened as the Edgar Allen Library in 1909

Located to the left of Firth Court, the Rotunda is a neo-Gothic style octagonal chapter house building beside the Weston Park. It was also designed by Gibbs and was constructed of mellow red-brick and sandstone. Opened as the Edgar Allen Building on 26 April 1909 by Prince and Princess of Wales, the building was constructed as a donation from William Edgar Allen, a member of the University Council, to provide a purpose-built library to the university. It housed the Edgar Allen Library that had 100 seats in its reading room and shelves for 20,000 books. The Edgar Allen Library was replaced by a new main library (now Western Bank Library) in the late 1950s, and the Rotunda is currently used as the Registrar and Secretary's Office.

The Rotunda has a partly glazed pyramidal roof and a crenellated parapet. It is a 2-storey building with a basement. There is a circular arcade inside the Rotunda with compound piers and transoms containing portraits of university benefactors. The building is linked to the main block of Firth Court via a glazed corridor. The Rotunda (formerly Edgar Allen Building) should not be confused with the university's Edgar Allen House at 241 Glossop Road.

== Firth Court Quadrangle ==
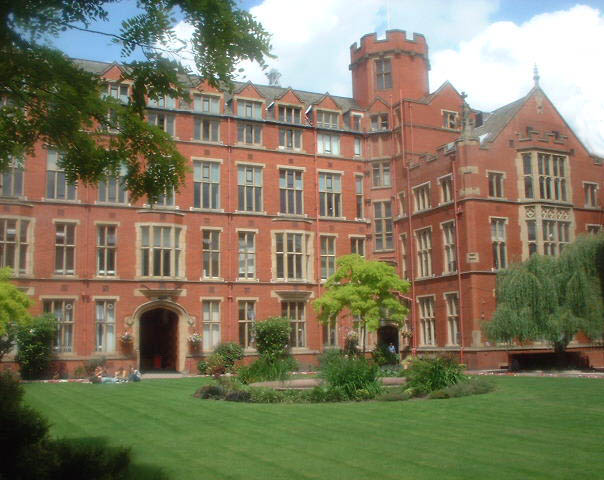
The North Block of Firth Court with the quadrangle in the foreground

The Firth Court quadrangle is composed of Firth Hall, North Block and West Block of Firth Court, and the adjoining Florey and Addison buildings. Firth Hall is the original Firth Court block (known formerly as the Western Bank Building) opened in 1905. The North Block and the West Block was completed in 1914 also by Gibbs, forming three sides of a quadrangle. Gibbs planned to build a double quadrangle within the complex, but this was never happened. The forth and the final side of the formal quadrangle was completed with the addition of the Florey and Addison buildings in the late 1940s. During the Second World War, the quadrangle was converted into an air raid shelter. The Firth Court main block, the rotunda and the quadrangle are listed Grade II, yet the Florey and Addison buildings are unlisted.

== See also ==
- Alfred Denny Building
- Western Bank Campus
