= University of Sheffield Students' Union =

Representative body of students at the University of Sheffield

Coordinates: 53°22′50.2″N 1°29′14.6″W

Sheffield Students' Union
- Institution: University of Sheffield
- Location: Western Bank, Sheffield, England
- Established: 1906
- Members: 27,885 student members
- Affiliations: National Union of Students, Aldwych Group, National Postgraduate Committee, Nightline, UKCOSA, Sheffield Chamber of Commerce
- Societies: Over 300 Clubs, Societies and Working Committees
- Website: Sheffield Students' Union

Student Executive Committee 2025/2026
- In Office
- 30 June 2025 – 30 June 2026

Full-time Sabbatical Officers
- President: Sam Omondi
- Liberation and Activities Officer: Avis Stone
- Education Officer: Lola-Mae Till
- International and Welfare Officer: Sana Memon
- Sustainability and Development Officer: Anna James
- Wellbeing and Sport Officer: Amelia Desouza

Senior Management
- Chief Executive: Daryl Ormerod
- Director of Social Enterprise: Chris Aucott
- Director of Digital Data and Marketing: Richard Copley
- Director of Student Community Development: Lauren Simpson-Smillie
- Director of Student Influence: Memunat Ayinla
- Director of People, Equity, and Organisational Development: Bethany Rogers

Sheffield Students' Union, officially known as the University of Sheffield Students' Union, is the representative body of students at the University of Sheffield. It is run by a team of six elected officers.

== History ==
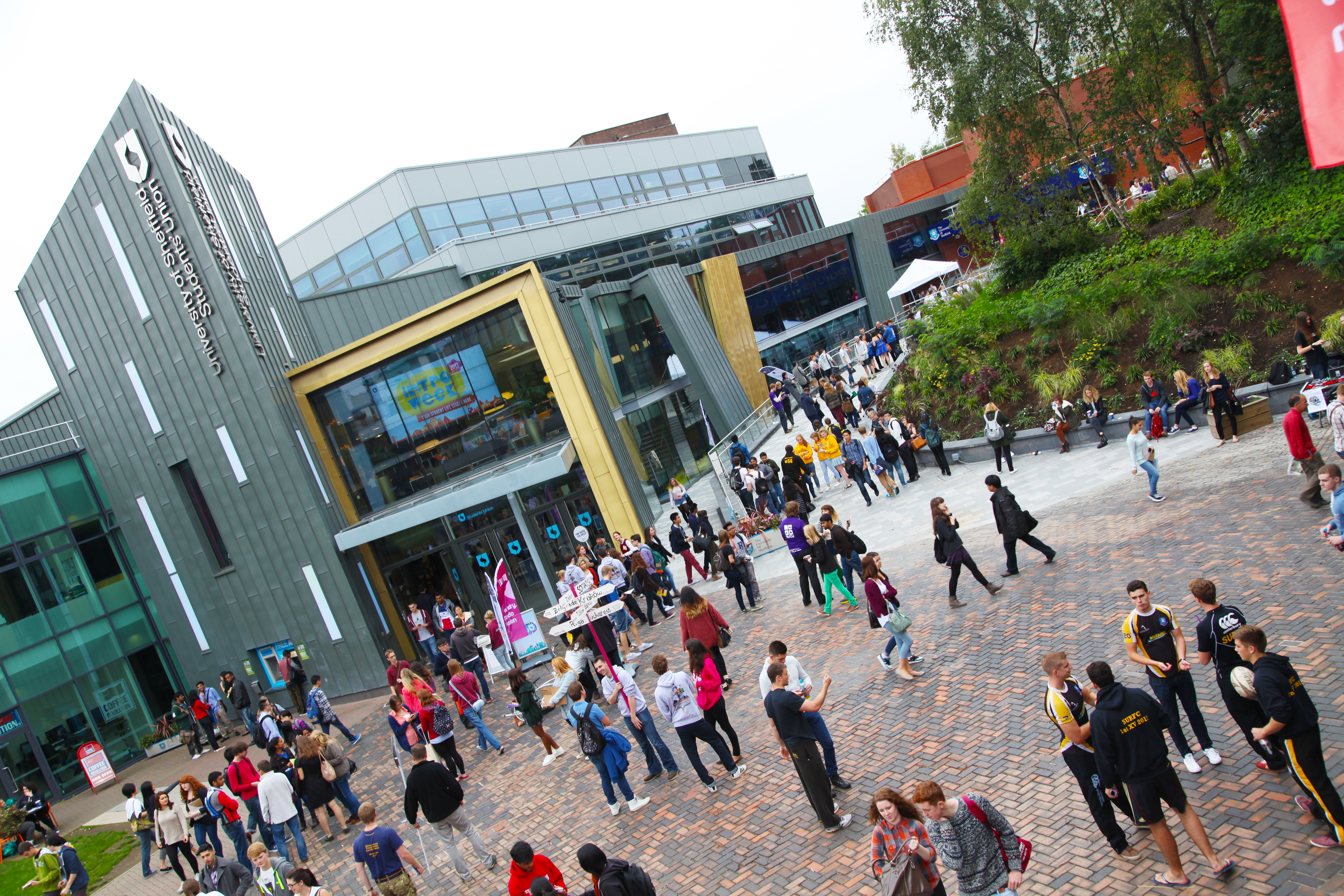
Concourse during Intro Week

The forerunner of the university was Firth College (1879) which had both a Student Common Room and student societies including an Athletics Union. The Common Room Committee specifically had a 'chairman/woman' indicating equal status (unusual for the time) with a woman student winning the earliest known election in 1896. However, for the university itself, a Student Representative Council (SRC) was formed in 1906, with the name 'The University of Sheffield Union of Students' being first used in 1923. The first SRC had 20 men and 10 women elected, with 4 men and 3 women as officers. There was a Student President and two Vice-Presidents, one male and one female. For some periods it was called the Guild of Students.

The building for the new university, now called Firth Court, had two common rooms for students, one for men and one for women in which events could be organized. There was initial reluctance to hold dances on university property, but eventually dances were held in the main hall at lunchtimes and evenings. The university acquired two small buildings in 1928 to serve as student clubs, but the Union did not get a separate building until 1936, when the Graves Building (funded by J. G. Graves and designed by the Professor of Architecture, Stephen Walsh) was donated to the Union. This building is still present within the complex, though the interior is much altered.

Because of the expansion in numbers, a new building, named University House, was constructed in 1960–61 adjacent to the Graves Building. It had what was claimed to be the longest Union bar in the country. Shortly after, University House was adjoined to the original Graves Building via a new building called Link, leaving the original part of University House to be given the name Tower. A further expansion of the building took place in 1978, and various refurbishments occurred thereafter until 1993–6 when there was extensive reconstruction and extension, to accommodate a further increase in numbers, creating a new, modernised building, designed by Mott Architecture.

In addition to the Union building, the Union shared facilities with the university in adjacent buildings; University House and the Octagon Centre. A major development project was completed in 2013, integrating University House, now divided into the adjoined Tower and Link buildings, into the original Union building and providing an enclosed sky bridge to the Octagon Centre.

== Aims and policies ==
The Students' Union aims to "advance the education of Students" by "representing the students of the University locally and nationally, organising services and activities to meet their needs" and "taking positive measures to encourage and build a student community which respects and celebrates the diversity of its membership".

The Students' Union, its officers and staff are bound by democratically chosen policies and are reviewed every three years (unless circumstances warrant a more frequent review).

=== Education policies ===
The Students' Union campaigns for the abolition of all tuition fees, introduction of financial support for postgraduate students, reinstatement of public investment in education as a social good, and against cuts to education.

=== Environmental and ethical policies ===
The Students' Union maintains an environmental policy, undertaking the Students' Union to: educate its members on the issue of climate change, implement an Environment Code of Best Practice, call on the university to reduce its environmental footprint, lobby local authorities to work towards a sustainable Sheffield. Nestlé products are banned within the Students' Union and its commercial services and the Students' Union has no dealings with the company due to its "unfair exploitation of third world countries". As the result of a referendum in 2012, the Students' Union has introduced a 'strong anti-arms trade policy', and has consistently lobbied the university since to divest itself of any involvement with the international arms trade. In a referendum in 2011, students of Sheffield Students' Union approved a policy to stop selling bottled water and replace it with a series of free drinking fountains and affordable, re-usable bottles. The bottled water ban was upheld following a referendum in October 2014, and is still in place as of 2026. The Students' Union council gave its support to the Go Fossil Free campaign by passing a motion in spring 2014. This global divestment movement, initiated by 350.org, encourages investors to remove their financial support for companies involved in the extraction and combustion of fossil fuels; activities which must be stopped in order to limit anthropogenic global warming.

=== Representative policies ===
The Students' Union has LGBT friendly policy, ensuring that all activities, facilities, services, organisations and events are LGBT friendly.

=== Policies pertaining to the Israeli–Palestinian conflict ===
The University of Sheffield Students' Union has two policies relating to the Israeli–Palestinian conflict, entitled "End Israeli Occupation" and "Twinning with the Islamic University of Gaza". The Students' Union, according to these policies, lobbies the university to "divest itself from ... companies that are complicit in the occupation of the Palestinian territories" and ensures that the university fosters links with the Islamic University of Gaza, offering a scholarship programme to one of their students on an annual basis. It further commits the Students' Union to "raise awareness of the global Boycott, Divestment and Sanctions (BDS) movement", although does not explicitly endorse it as was the case prior to March 2019.

On 16 January 2018, the Students' Union released a statement condemning the decision of US President Donald Trump to recognise Jerusalem as the capital of Israel. In the statement, on behalf of the Students' Union Council, now former President Kieran Maxwell condemned the move as resulting in "the human rights of Palestinians [being] undermined and violated" and called for "an end to the Israeli occupation of Palestinian territories, and for East Jerusalem to be recognised as the Capital of Palestine".

== Representation ==
The Union is run by a variety of working, representative and standing committees, presided over by the Student Union Council (SUC), seven elected full-time officers and six part-time officers (prior to the 21/22 academic year there were eight full-time officer roles and no part-time officers). These elected officers are supported by a number permanent staff led by the Chief Executive Daryl Ormerod who took over the reins from Chris Aucott (who, in turn, succeeded Jaki Booth). Paul Blomfield, ex-MP for Sheffield Central constituency, was in the role for a number of years before stepping down in 2010. It is a constituent member of the NUS.

A full list of the SU's Elected Officers can be seen on the SU's 'Year Book' website page – this list goes back to 1906.

Current full-time Officers
2026-27
| President | Sam Omondi |
| Education | Lola-Mae Till |
| International and Welfare Officer | Sana Memon |
| Liberation and Activities | Avis Stone |
| Sustainability and Development | Anna James |
| Wellbeing and Sport Officer | Amelia Desouza |

Previous full-time officers
| Role | 2021–22 | 2022–23 | 2023–24 | 2024–25 | 2025-26 |
|---|---|---|---|---|---|
| President | Evie Croxford | Liam Hand | Lily Byrne | Daisy Watson | Eli Thompson |
| Liberation | Shona Tulloch | Grace Cleary | Tomás Rocha Lawrence | Tomás Rocha Lawrence | Laura Edwards |
| Education | Savannah Hanson | Alison Romaine | Maria Jose Lourido Moreno | Maria Jose Lourido Moreno | Sam Omondi |
| International and Community | Taylor Ogle | Anna Fedotova | Derick Liew | Jephthah Ekogiawe | Kiara Alejandra Delgado Derteano |
| Activities and Development | Morgan McArthur | Rose Franchi | Anna Campbell | Anna Campbell | Laura Edwards |
| Wellbeing and Sport | Charlotte McGinley | Iwan James | Annie Henderson | Annie Henderson | Amelia Desouza |
| Welfare and Sustainability | Anesu (Ness) Mantanda Mambingo | Samuel Timson | Jo Campling | Nadya Ghani | Anna James |

Previous part-time officers
| Role | 2021–22 | 2022–23 | 2023–24 | 2024–25 |
|---|---|---|---|---|
| Ethnic Diversity Students | Blair Jamila | Dhyasa Morgan | Ahmad Arshad Waris | Kiara Alejandra Delgado Derteano |
| Disabled & Neurodiversity Students | Iz Ostrowska | Shona Tulloch | Laura Edwards | Nick Michau |
| LGBTQIA+ Students | Phob Unsworth | Jamie Shipp | Jephtah Ekogiawe | Anmol Dubey |
| Postgraduate Students | Lissi Abnett | Alice Patterson | Louise Stevenson | Beth Hayward |
| Women Students | Hannah Budd | Riya Chauhan | Zoe Lancaster | Eloise Taylor |
| Mature Students | Tom Hill | Freya AJ Vanevery | Yasin Hussain | Benito Hart Prieto |

Full-time officers prior to the 2021 governance changes
| Role | Academic year | | | |
| Role | 2017–2018 | 2018–2019 | 2019–2020 | 2020–2021 |
|---|---|---|---|---|
| President | Kieran Maxwell | Lilian Jones | Jake Verity | Beth Eyre |
| Education | Stuart McMillian | Anna Crump Raiswell | Charlie Porter | Ellie Lynas |
| Development | Megan McGrath | Mel Kee | Harry Carling | Jordan Weir |
| Activities | Tom Brindley | Cecilia Hudson-Molinaro | Martha Daisy Evans | Joel Kirk |
| Sports | Flo Brookes | Sarah Morse | Brittany Bowles | Matt Graves |
| Women | Celeste Jones | Mayeda Tayyab | Rosa Tully | Lily Grimshaw |
| Welfare | Reena Staves | Katherine Swindells | Beren Maddison | Holly Ellis |
| International Students' | Santhana Gopalakrishnan | Rex Béchu | Sissi Li | Iuri Montenegro |

== Facilities ==
The Union has a turnover of around £11,000,000. It provides for over 270 student societies, and contains a student employment service, two bars, three club venues, and outlets for food and drink, clothing and stationery.

'Bar One', located on Floor 1 of University House, is a traditional student bar which also holds pre-club nights with music and special events, and serves food and drinks. 'Bar One' was previously the longest union bar in the country. The union contains one of the largest beer gardens in Sheffield.

Floor 2 houses three nightclub/performance venues - Foundry, Studio, and Fusion - collectively known as Foundry. It is one of the most popular nightclub venues in Sheffield. Floor 2 also houses the Nelson Mandela Auditorium, a 390-seat auditorium which is used for a range of events and teaching.

Floor 3 of University House is the ground level for the building, and houses the main entrance. All of the eateries and shops are found on this level. Floor 4 contains several large study spaces, meeting rooms, and the offices for Union officers. Floor 5 is home to the restaurant/conference venue Inox, and more meeting rooms, and Floor 6 houses offices for some administrative departments within the University.

The Graves Building houses another restaurant/bar, Interval, which has been closed since 2024 while the building undergoes maintenance work.

== Activities ==
=== Events ===
The Students' Union holds a variety of student club nights throughout the week at the main club venue, Foundry. These include pop music nights ROAR on Wednesday, Pop Tarts on Saturday. On Tuesdays, The Tuesday Club is a night focusing on underground dance music, usually Drum and Bass, UK Garage or House. Various other nights including LGBT+ night "Grapefruit" and "Soul Jam which are held in the Foundry monthly on alternating weeks. Live music events and gigs are also regularly held in the Foundry, along with conference events and fairs.

Several times a year, larger, multi-venue events encompassing the entire Students' Union site, such as Halloween Freaks Festival in October and Summer Social in June, attracting over 4,000 students.

The Union, under its obligation as part of the NUS to provide 24-hour support for students, funds Sheffield University Nightline, a telephone and email based listening and information service run by student volunteers from the university.

=== Societies and clubs ===
The Union has a list of approximately 320 societies and clubs, all run through a section of the union named "The Activities and Sports Zone".

Film Unit, the Union's Film Committee, shows three films a week during term time on Fridays, Saturdays and Sundays. Films are played in a cinema with a capacity of nearly 400, equipped with commercial 35 mm film projectors and a Dolby Digital sound system. SUTCo (Sheffield University Theatre Company) produce six plays a year at the Drama Studio, a studio theatre converted from a church, as well as the biennial 24 Hour Charity Musical – rehearsed, choreographed, designed and produced within a 24-hour period. They also produce two alternative venue productions per year. The Technical Services Committee (TSC) are volunteers responsible for the setting up and running of equipment at the aforementioned club nights and live events at the Union.

=== Charity ===
The union has an active volunteering and charity community. The RAG (Raising and Giving society) raised over £180,000 in 2011–12, through general fundraising and several larger events; the union is host to the world's largest student organised charity hitchhike, Bummit, which runs every year. Another RAG tradition is Spiderwalk, a 12.5-mile trek through the city and the Peak District through the night; other societies run fund-raising activities throughout the night, such as a 24-hour role-playing event. The Union's "SheffieldVolunteering" scheme is one of the country's most active and well-recognised student volunteering schemes, with over 26,269 hours logged in 2011–12, and has won various national acclaims over the years.

=== Publications and broadcasting ===
The union's publication and broadcasting is branded under the name of Forge Media.

The Forge Press newspaper (formerly The Steel Press) is published fortnightly, while Forge Radio is the union's own radio station which broadcasts throughout the Union building during term-time and over the internet. Forge TV – the newest part of Forge Media – is the Union's own television station, broadcasting online and around campus, as well as producing on-demand content.

As of September 2010, former Radio 1 DJ Mary Anne Hobbs joined the Forge Media team.

=== Sports ===
The union supports a large number of sports teams, which compete in the BUCS championships. The annual Varsity Challenge takes place between teams from the university and its rival Sheffield Hallam University in over 30 events.

== Awards ==
It has won a succession of prestigious awards, including:

– Students' Union of the Year in the Whatuni Student Choice Awards every year between 2017 and 2025

– Best Higher Education Students' Union in the country at the first ever NUS awards ceremony in 2008

– Top UK Student Union: in the 2001 Virgin Alternative Guide to Universities

– #1 Students' Union in the UK in the Times Higher Education annual awards, every year from 2009 until the SU category was removed.
