= Drama Studio, University of Sheffield =

Theatre in Sheffield, South Yorkshire, England

Drama Studio
- Glossop Road Baptist Church
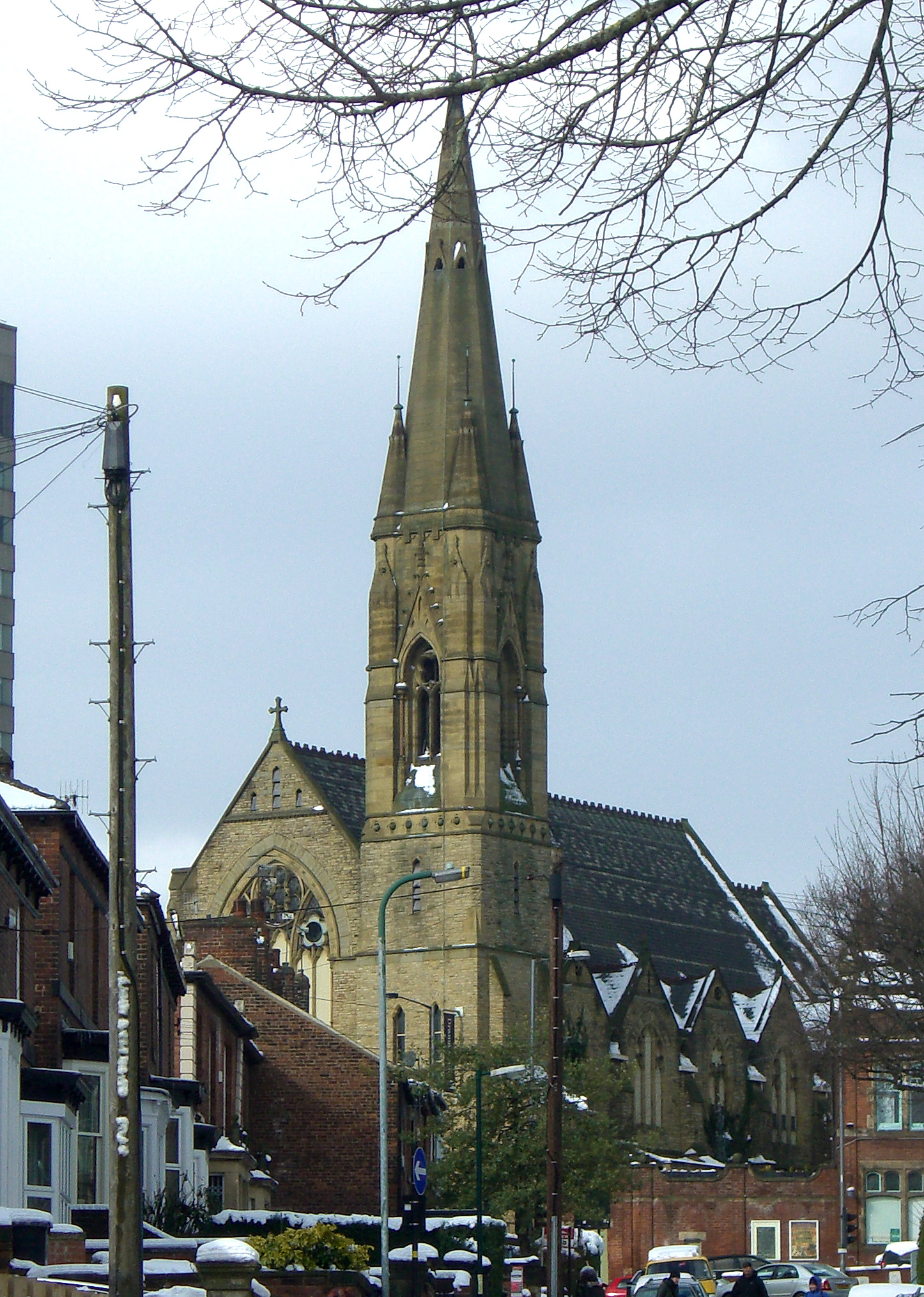
- Drama Studio viewed from Wilkinson Street.

- Location of the Drama Studio within Sheffield.
- Address: Shearwood Road, Sheffield, S10 2TD; South Yorkshire; England
- Coordinates: 53.3792°N 1.4898°W
- Operator: University of Sheffield
- Capacity: 177 - 245 (depending on configuration)
- Type: Studio theatre
- Designation: Listed Building Grade II
- Public transit: B Y University of Sheffield

Construction
- Opened: 30 June 1970

Website
- Official website

The Drama Studio is an intimate 177 seat theatre venue owned by the University of Sheffield and operated by the university’s Performance Venues department. Opened in 1970, it is housed in the former Glossop Road Baptist Church and retains many of the original architectural features. The studio also offers 3 individual rehearsal spaces that are available to hire.

The Drama Studio offers an adaptable playing space that can be configured in many different ways. The standard main stage area is 8mx7m, with options to add more seating or staging as required. The studio is also equipped with a full professional lighting and sound system.

The studio is used throughout the year by university affiliated theatre groups, local amateur dramatics societies and professional touring artists & musicians. The bi-annual Enable US festival is also resident in the Drama Studio. Enable US is a project within the university’s Performance Venues for creative expression, exploration, development and debate, which aims to provide new and innovative performing arts companies a platform to perform in Sheffield.

== See also ==
- University of Sheffield
- University of Sheffield Octagon Centre
- University of Sheffield Union of Students
