= University House, University of Sheffield =

Building in Sheffield, England

Coordinates: 53.380639°N 1.487614°W

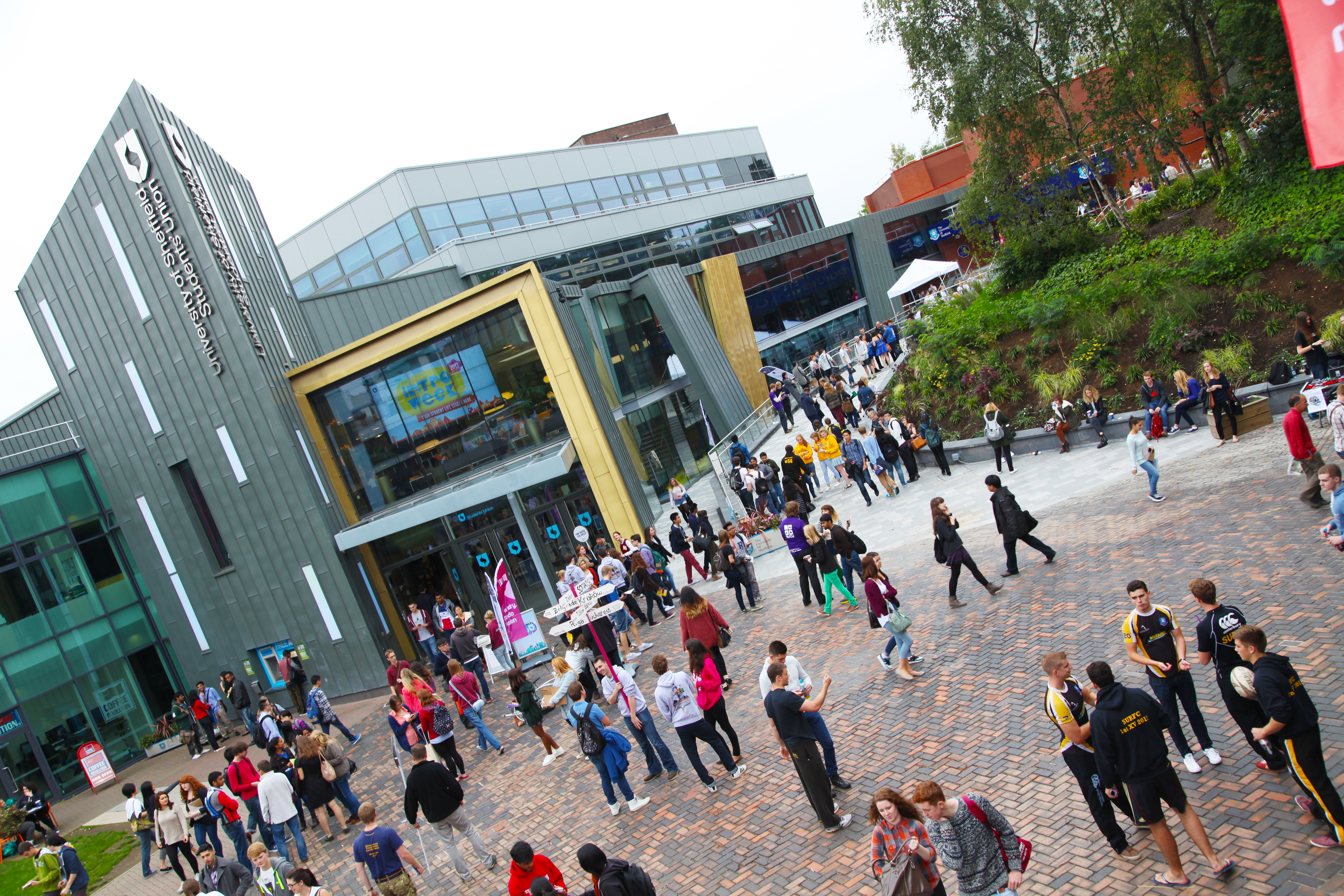
View across the concourse to the refurbished building (2013)

University House is a large 6-floor building in the centre of the University of Sheffield's campus which houses the University of Sheffield Students' Union.

== Current usage ==
The building is currently used to house part of the students' union on floors 1 to 4 and some administrative departments of the university. Floor 1 contains the Union's student bar, Bar One. Floor 2 houses the nightclub/performance venue Foundry. Floor 3 houses the main entrance to the Union, the reception desk, and a range of shops, food outlets, student helpdesks and seating areas. Floor 4 houses several large study spaces, including a one-off-events kitchen in the former View Deli cafe, student officer offices, and meeting rooms. Floor 5 houses meeting rooms, as well as the restaurant/conference venue Inox. Floor 6 is home to several administrative offices for the university.

== History ==
The original structure was built in 1963 and was located to the west, isolated from the older Graves Building to the east. The building housed the union bar (now known as Bar One) and two food areas, the lower refectory (now the Foundry) and upper refectory (now the City View cafe and Loxley's food court), amongst other offices and union departments. The 5th floor was another catering area used by staff, and also housed a room for staff, known as the Senior Common Room (SCR).

During the mid-sixties the Union of students in conjunction with the university extended the building to connect it to the Graves building to the east and this section has become known as the "Link Building". It is still part of the University House building however. As a result, the floor numbering can become confusing, with slightly different physical levels between the three buildings all being assigned the same number and usually isolated from each other. For instance level 4 in the Link building houses a student work area and sabbatical offices, while the original University House building (named 'Tower') houses the food court/cafes, and the Graves building houses some administrative and marketing offices.

A £20 million refurbishment of the building took place between July 2012 and September 2013.

== See also ==
- University of Sheffield
- Octagon Centre
