= Compound pier =

Clustered column or pier which consists of a centre mass or newel

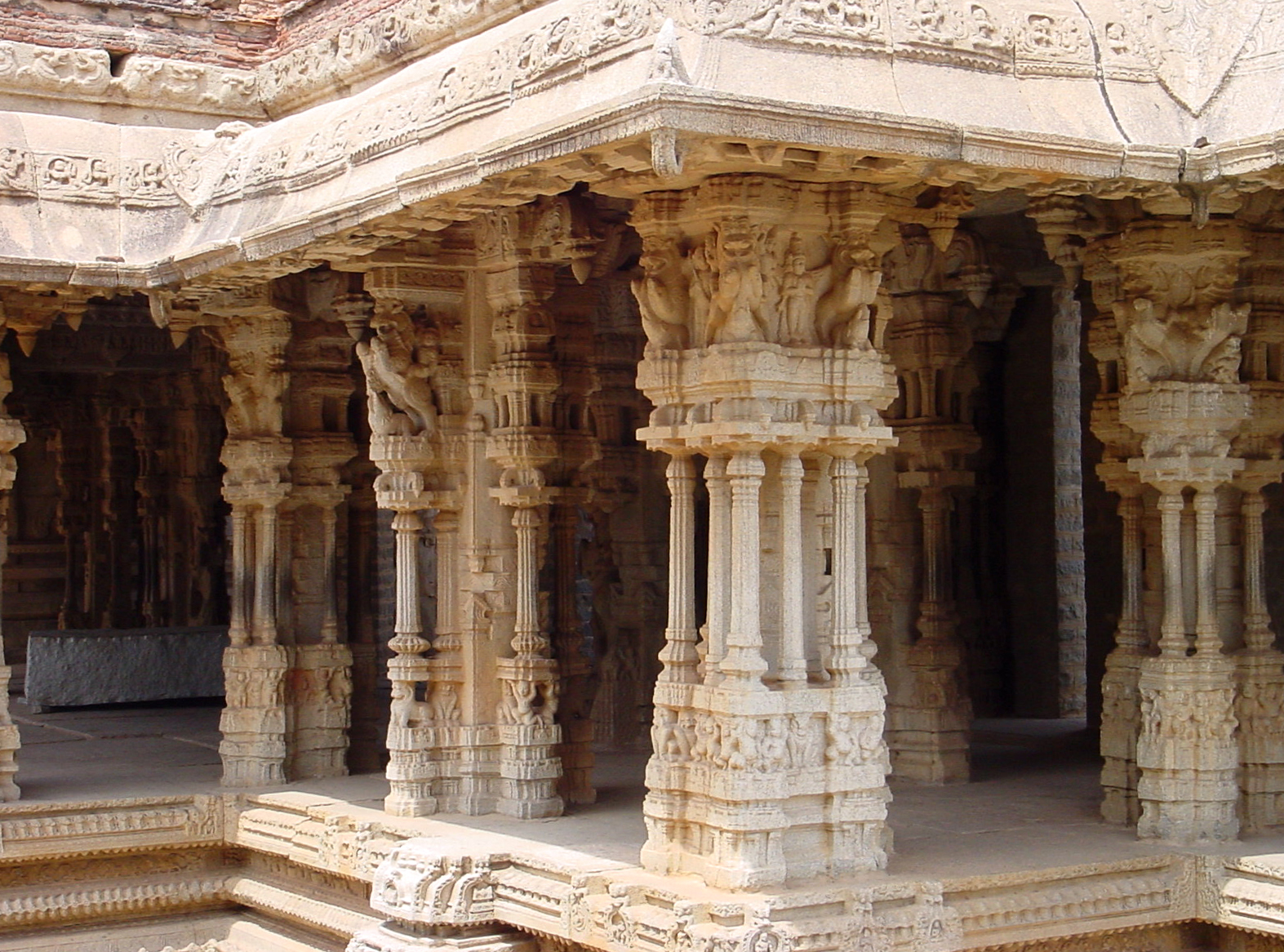
Example of a compound pier in the maha mandapa of the Vitthala Temple in Hampi, south India.

Compound pier or cluster pier is the architectural term given to a clustered column or pier which consists of a centre mass or newel, to which engaged or semi-detached shafts have been attached, in order to perform (or to suggest the performance of) certain definite structural objects, such as to carry arches of additional orders, or to support the transverse or diagonal ribs of a vault, or the tie-beam of an important roof. In these cases, though performing different functions, the drums of the pier are often cut out of one stone. There are, however, cases where the shafts are detached from the pier and coupled to it by annulets at regular heights, as in the Early English period.

Compound piers can often be found in Romanesque cathedrals of France and Norman architecture of England, including cathedrals of Durham, Winchester, Ely, and Peterborough. The Gothic evolution of the idea is frequently called a clustered column or cluster column.

== Pilier cantonné ==
A pilier cantonné is a type of compound pier commonly associated with High Gothic architecture. First used in the construction of the Chartres Cathedral, the pilier cantonné has four colonettes attached to a large central core that support the arcade, aisle vaults and nave-vaulting responds.

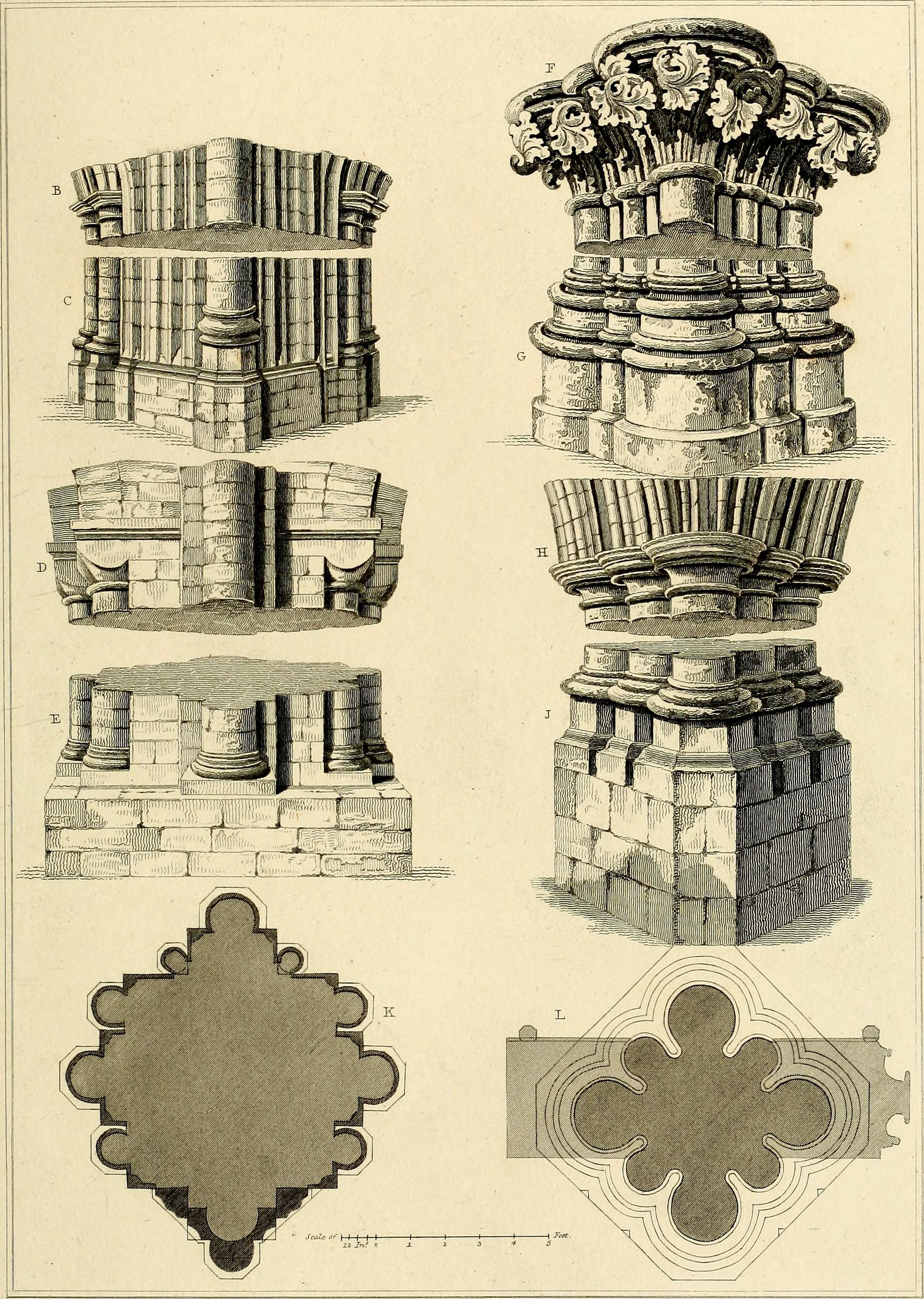
Diagram of compound pier in Winchester Cathedral in Winchester, England

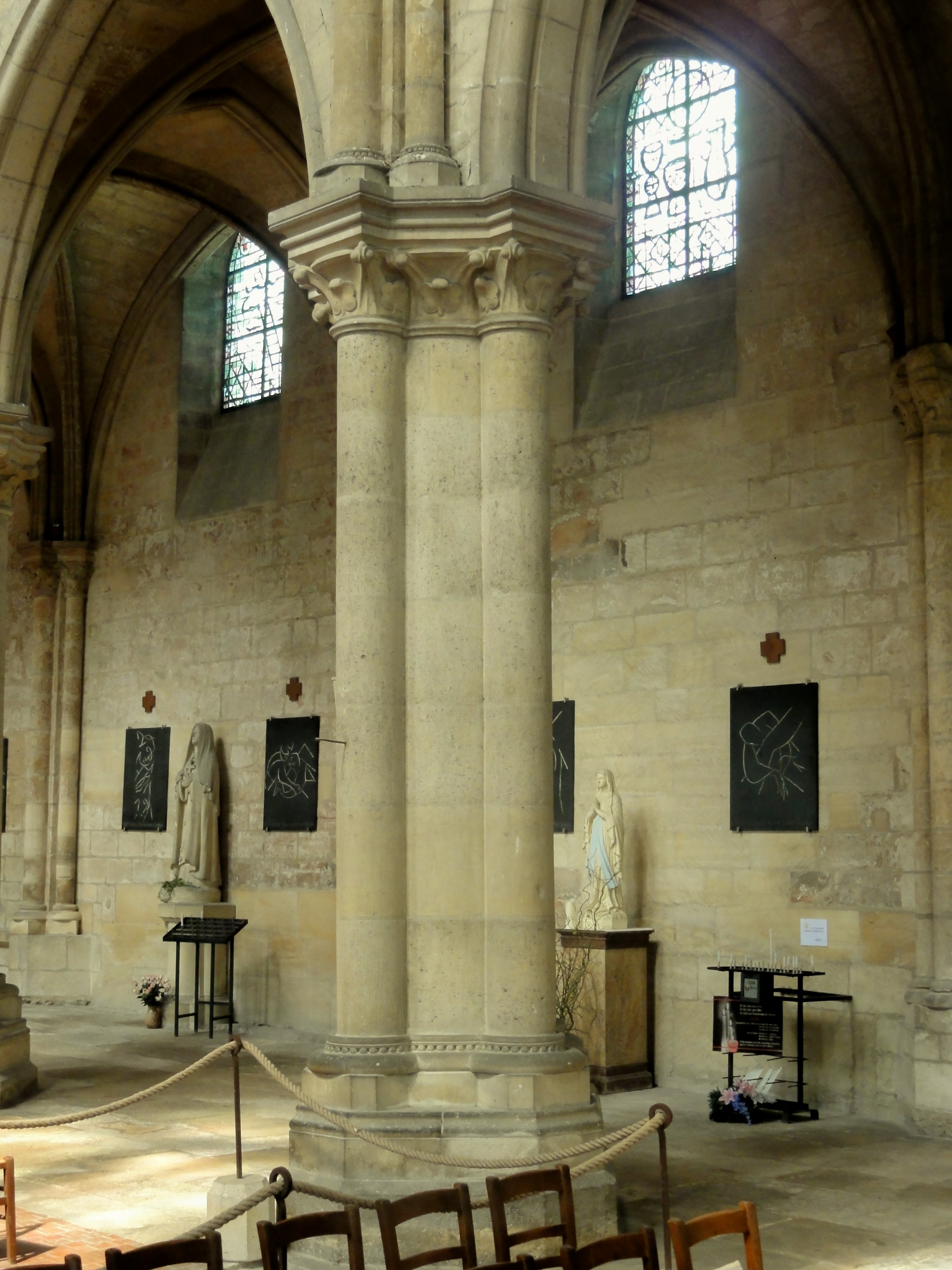
Pilier cantonné

== See also ==
- Compound arch

== Sources ==
- Hoey, Lawrence R. (1989). "Pier Form and Vertical Wall Articulation in English Romanesque Architecture". Journal of the Society of Architectural Historians. 48 (3). [Society of Architectural Historians, University of California Press]: 258–283. ISSN 0037-9808. JSTOR 990431.
- Compound pier at the Encyclopædia Britannica
