= List of NHS trusts in England =

This list of NHS trusts in England provides details of current and former English NHS trusts, NHS foundation trusts, acute hospital trusts, ambulance trusts, mental health trusts, and the unique Isle of Wight NHS Trust. As of April 2020, 217 extant trusts employed about 800,000 of the NHS's 1.2 million staff.

NHS trusts were introduced in 1992, and their number, composition, form and naming has changed over time such that there are perhaps 1,000 distinct trust names in the literature; this list seeks to identify establishment, merger, dissolution and renaming events, and the succession of services from one name or trust to another. Sufficiently distinct names are listed on distinct rows; minimally changed names (especially X NHS Trust changed to X NHS Foundation Trust) are listed on a single row. Dates are generally as established in underlying legislation; operational start and end dates may differ. Former trusts are listed below the current trusts.

This list excludes community health trusts established under the National Health Service and Community Care Act 1990 and their successors, primary care trusts, for which see the list of primary care trusts in England. All such trusts were abolished on 31 March 2013.

All trusts are supervised by NHS England.

- For the distinct system of NHS Health Boards in Scotland, see NHS Scotland
- For the system in Northern Ireland, see Health and Social Care in Northern Ireland
- For the system in Wales, see NHS Wales and List of NHS Wales trusts and health boards

== A ==
- Airedale NHS Foundation Trust, established 1 November 1991 as Airedale NHS Trust, authorised as a foundation trust on 1 June 2010.
- Alder Hey Children's NHS Foundation Trust, established 21 December 1990 as Royal Liverpool Children's Hospital and Community Services NHS Trust, changed its name to The Royal Liverpool Children's National Health Service Trust on 15 March 1996, authorised as a foundation trust 1 August 2008.
- Ashford and St Peter's Hospitals NHS Foundation Trust
- Avon and Wiltshire Mental Health Partnership NHS Trust

== B ==
- Barking, Havering and Redbridge University Hospitals NHS Trust
- Barnsley Hospital NHS Foundation Trust
- Barts Health NHS Trust
- Bedfordshire Hospitals NHS Foundation Trust was formed on 1 April 2020 from the acquisition by Luton and Dunstable Hospital NHS Foundation Trust of Bedford Hospital NHS Trust
- Berkshire Healthcare NHS Foundation Trust
- Birmingham and Solihull Mental Health NHS Foundation Trust
- Birmingham Community Healthcare NHS Foundation Trust
- Birmingham Women's and Children's NHS Foundation Trust
- Black Country Partnership NHS Foundation Trust
- Blackpool Teaching Hospitals NHS Foundation Trust
- Bolton NHS Foundation Trust
- Bradford District Care NHS Foundation Trust
- Bradford Teaching Hospitals NHS Foundation Trust
- Bridgewater Community Healthcare
- Bristol NHS Foundation Trust formed in July 2026 after merging North Bristol NHS Trust and University Hospitals Bristol and Weston NHS Foundation Trust
- Buckinghamshire Healthcare NHS Trust

== C ==
- Calderdale and Huddersfield NHS Foundation Trust
- Cambridge University Hospitals NHS Foundation Trust
- Cambridgeshire and Peterborough NHS Foundation Trust
- Cambridgeshire Community Services NHS Trust
- Central and North West London NHS Foundation Trust
- Central London Community Healthcare NHS Trust
- Chelsea and Westminster Hospital NHS Foundation Trust
- Cheshire and Wirral Partnership NHS Foundation Trust
- Chesterfield Royal Hospital NHS Foundation Trust
- The Christie NHS Foundation Trust
- Clatterbridge Cancer Centre NHS Foundation Trust
- Cornwall Partnership NHS Foundation Trust
- County Durham and Darlington NHS Foundation Trust
- Countess of Chester Hospital NHS Foundation Trust
- Coventry and Warwickshire Partnership NHS Trust
- Croydon Health Services NHS Trust, established 22 January 1993 as Mayday Healthcare NHS Trust, adopted its current name on 1 October 2010.

== D ==
- Dartford and Gravesham NHS Trust
- Derbyshire Community Health Services NHS Trust
- Derbyshire Healthcare NHS Foundation Trust
- Devon Partnership NHS Trust
- Doncaster and Bassetlaw Teaching Hospitals NHS Foundation Trust
- Dorset County Hospital NHS Foundation Trust
- Dorset HealthCare University NHS Foundation Trust
- Dudley Group NHS Foundation Trust

== E ==
- East and North Hertfordshire Teaching NHS Trust
- East Cheshire NHS Trust
- East Kent Hospitals University NHS Foundation Trust
- East Lancashire Hospitals NHS Trust
- East London NHS Foundation Trust
- East Midlands Ambulance Service NHS Trust
- East of England Ambulance Service NHS Trust
- East Suffolk and North Essex NHS Foundation Trust was created by a merger of Colchester Hospital University NHS Foundation Trust and Ipswich Hospital NHS Trust in 2018
- East Sussex Healthcare NHS Trust
- Epsom and St Helier University Hospitals NHS Trust
- Essex Partnership University NHS Foundation Trust created 2017 by merger between South Essex Partnership University NHS Foundation Trust and North Essex Partnership University NHS Foundation Trust.

== F ==
- Frimley Health NHS Foundation Trust

== G ==
- Gateshead Health NHS Foundation Trust
- George Eliot Hospital NHS Trust, Warwickshire
- Gloucestershire Health and Care NHS Foundation Trust formed by merger of 2gether NHS Foundation Trust and Gloucestershire Care Services NHS Trust in October 2019
- Gloucestershire Hospitals NHS Foundation Trust
- Great Ormond Street Hospital for Children NHS Foundation Trust
- Great Western Hospitals NHS Foundation Trust
- Guy's and St Thomas' NHS Foundation Trust

== H ==
- Hampshire Hospitals NHS Foundation Trust
- Harrogate and District NHS Foundation Trust
- Hertfordshire Community NHS Trust
- Hertfordshire Partnership University NHS Foundation Trust
- Hillingdon Hospitals NHS Foundation Trust
- Homerton University Hospital NHS Foundation Trust
- Hounslow and Richmond Community Healthcare NHS Trust
- Hull University Teaching Hospitals NHS Trust
- Humber Teaching NHS Foundation Trust

== I ==
- Imperial College Healthcare NHS Trust
- Isle of Wight NHS Trust

== J ==
- James Paget University Hospitals NHS Foundation Trust

== K ==
- Kent and Medway NHS and Social Care Partnership Trust
- Kent Community Health NHS Foundation Trust
- Kettering General Hospital NHS Foundation Trust
- King's College Hospital NHS Foundation Trust
- Kingston Hospital NHS Foundation Trust

== L ==
- Lancashire Teaching Hospitals NHS Foundation Trust
- Lancashire and South Cumbria NHS Foundation Trust, formerly known as Lancashire Care NHS Foundation Trust
- Leeds and York Partnership NHS Foundation Trust
- Leeds Community Healthcare NHS Trust
- Leeds Teaching Hospitals NHS Trust
- Leicestershire Partnership NHS Trust
- Lewisham and Greenwich NHS Trust
- Lincolnshire Community Health Services
- Lincolnshire Partnership NHS Foundation Trust
- Liverpool Community Health NHS Trust
- Liverpool Heart and Chest Hospital NHS Foundation Trust
- Liverpool University Hospitals NHS Foundation Trust formed by merger of Royal Liverpool and Broadgreen University Hospitals NHS Trust and Aintree University Hospitals NHS Foundation Trust in October 2019
- Liverpool Women's NHS Foundation Trust
- London Ambulance Service NHS Trust
- London North West University Healthcare NHS Trust, formerly the London North West Healthcare NHS Trust

== M ==
- Maidstone and Tunbridge Wells NHS Trust
- Manchester University NHS Foundation Trust formed by merger of Central Manchester University Hospitals NHS Foundation Trust and University Hospital of South Manchester NHS Foundation Trust in 2017
- Medway NHS Foundation Trust
- Mersey and West Lancashire Teaching Hospitals NHS Trust formed on 1 July 2023 from the merger of Southport and Ormskirk Hospital NHS Trust and St Helens and Knowsley Teaching Hospitals NHS Trust
- Mersey Care NHS Foundation Trust
- Mid and South Essex NHS Foundation Trust
- Mid Cheshire Hospitals NHS Foundation Trust
- Mid Yorkshire Hospitals NHS Trust
- Midlands Partnership NHS Foundation Trust was formed by a merger of Staffordshire and Stoke-on-Trent Partnership NHS Trust and South Staffordshire and Shropshire Healthcare NHS Foundation Trust in 2018
- Milton Keynes University Hospital NHS Foundation Trust
- Moorfields Eye Hospital NHS Foundation Trust

== N ==
- Newcastle upon Tyne Hospitals NHS Foundation Trust
- Norfolk and Norwich University Hospitals NHS Foundation Trust
- Norfolk and Suffolk NHS Foundation Trust
- Norfolk Community Health and Care NHS Trust
- North Cumbria Integrated Care NHS Foundation Trust created in October 2019 by a merger between Cumbria Partnership NHS Foundation Trust and North Cumbria University Hospitals NHS Trust
- North East Ambulance Service NHS Foundation Trust
- North East London NHS Foundation Trust
- North Middlesex University Hospital NHS Trust
- North Staffordshire Combined Healthcare NHS Trust
- North Tees and Hartlepool NHS Foundation Trust
- North West Ambulance Service NHS Trust
- North West Anglia NHS Foundation Trust formed from the acquisition by Peterborough and Stamford Hospitals NHS Foundation Trust of Hinchingbrooke Health Care NHS Trust in 2017
- North West Boroughs Healthcare NHS Foundation Trust, from 1 April 2017 the new name of 5 Boroughs Partnership NHS Foundation Trust. Services in Wigan, Bolton and Greater Manchester transferred to Greater Manchester Mental Health NHS Foundation Trust in April 2021. Cheshire and Merseyside services merged into Mersey Care NHS Foundation Trust from June 2021.
- Northampton General Hospital NHS Trust
- Northamptonshire Healthcare NHS Foundation Trust
- Northern Care Alliance NHS Group, created by merger of Salford Royal NHS Foundation Trust and The Pennine Acute Hospitals NHS Trust in 2021
- Northern Lincolnshire and Goole Hospitals NHS Foundation Trust
- Northumberland, Tyne and Wear NHS Foundation Trust
- Northumbria Healthcare NHS Foundation Trust
- Nottingham University Hospitals NHS Trust
- Nottinghamshire Healthcare NHS Foundation Trust

== O ==
- Online NHS Trust
- Oxford Health NHS Foundation Trust
- Oxford University Hospitals NHS Foundation Trust
- Oxleas NHS Foundation Trust

== P ==
- Pennine Care NHS Foundation Trust
- Portsmouth Hospitals NHS Trust
- The Princess Alexandra Hospital NHS Trust

== Q ==
- Queen Elizabeth Hospital, King's Lynn, NHS Foundation Trust
- Queen Victoria Hospital NHS Foundation Trust

== R ==
- Robert Jones and Agnes Hunt Orthopaedic Hospital NHS Foundation Trust
- Rotherham Doncaster and South Humber NHS Foundation Trust
- Rotherham NHS Foundation Trust
- Royal Berkshire NHS Foundation Trust
- Royal Brompton and Harefield NHS Foundation Trust
- Royal Devon University Healthcare NHS Foundation Trust
- Royal Free London NHS Foundation Trust
- Royal Marsden NHS Foundation Trust
- Royal National Orthopaedic Hospital NHS Trust
- Royal Orthopaedic Hospital NHS Foundation Trust
- Royal Papworth Hospital NHS Foundation Trust
- Royal Surrey County Hospital NHS Foundation Trust
- Royal United Hospitals Bath NHS Foundation Trust
- Royal Wolverhampton Hospitals NHS Trust

== S ==
- Salisbury NHS Foundation Trust
- Sandwell and West Birmingham Hospitals NHS Trust
- Sheffield Children's NHS Foundation Trust
- Sheffield Health Partnership University NHS Foundation Trust
- Sheffield Teaching Hospitals NHS Foundation Trust
- Sherwood Forest Hospitals NHS Foundation Trust
- Shrewsbury and Telford Hospital NHS Trust
- Shropshire Community Health NHS Trust established 2011
- Solent NHS Trust
- Somerset NHS Foundation Trust, established by merger in 2020, further expanded in April 2023 by merger with Yeovil District Hospital NHS Foundation Trust
- South Central Ambulance Service NHS Foundation Trust
- South East Coast Ambulance Service NHS Foundation Trust
- South London and Maudsley NHS Foundation Trust
- South Staffordshire Healthcare NHS Trust, established 19 January 2001, authorised as South Staffordshire and Shropshire Healthcare NHS Foundation Trust on 1 May 2006, and renamed South Staffordshire and Shropshire Healthcare NHS Foundation Trust on 1 June 2007 after integration of services from Shropshire.
- South Tees Hospitals NHS Foundation Trust
- South Tyneside and Sunderland NHS Foundation Trust formed by merger of City Hospitals Sunderland NHS Foundation Trust and South Tyneside NHS Foundation Trust in April 2019
- South Warwickshire NHS Foundation Trust
- South West London and St George's Mental Health NHS Trust
- South West Yorkshire Partnership NHS Foundation Trust
- South Western Ambulance Service NHS Foundation Trust
- Southern Health NHS Foundation Trust
- St George's University Hospitals NHS Foundation Trust
- Stockport NHS Foundation Trust
- Surrey and Borders Partnership NHS Foundation Trust
- Surrey and Sussex Healthcare NHS Trust
- Sussex Community NHS Trust
- Sussex Partnership NHS Trust

== T ==
- Tavistock and Portman NHS Foundation Trust
- Tees, Esk and Wear Valleys NHS Foundation Trust
- Torbay and South Devon NHS Foundation Trust

== U ==
- United Lincolnshire Hospitals NHS Trust
- University College London Hospitals NHS Foundation Trust
- University Hospitals Coventry and Warwickshire NHS Trust
- University Hospitals Birmingham NHS Foundation Trust
- University Hospitals Dorset NHS Foundation Trust
- University Hospitals of Derby and Burton NHS Foundation Trust
- University Hospitals of Leicester NHS Trust
- University Hospitals of Morecambe Bay NHS Foundation Trust
- University Hospitals of North Midlands NHS Trust
- University Hospitals Plymouth NHS Trust
- University Hospital Southampton NHS Foundation Trust
- University Hospitals Sussex NHS Foundation Trust

== W ==
- Walsall Healthcare NHS Trust
- Walton Centre NHS Foundation Trust
- Warrington and Halton Hospitals NHS Foundation Trust
- West Hertfordshire Teaching Hospitals NHS Trust
- West Midlands Ambulance Service University NHS Foundation Trust
- West Suffolk NHS Foundation Trust
- The Whittington Hospital NHS Trust
- Wirral Community NHS Trust
- Wirral University Teaching Hospital NHS Foundation Trust
- Worcestershire Acute Hospitals NHS Trust
- Worcestershire Health and Care NHS Trust
- Wrightington, Wigan and Leigh NHS Foundation Trust
- Wye Valley NHS Trust

== Y ==
- York and Scarborough Teaching Hospitals NHS Foundation Trust
- Yorkshire Ambulance Service NHS Trust

== Former NHS trusts ==
=== 0-9 ===
- ^{2}gether NHS Foundation Trust, established as Gloucestershire Partnership NHS Trust on 1 April 2002, acquired Gloucestershire Care Services NHS Trust on 1 October 2019, becoming Gloucestershire Health and Care NHS Foundation Trust.
- 5 Boroughs Partnership NHS Trust was established on 1 April 2002, and authorised as a foundation trust in or after 2009, becoming 5 Boroughs Partnership NHS Foundation Trust. It changed its name to North West Boroughs Healthcare NHS Foundation Trust on 1 April 2017 after widening its activities outside the 5 boroughs from which it took its name.

=== A ===
- Addenbrooke's NHS Trust, established 4 November 1992, was authorised as a foundation trust and renamed Cambridge University Hospitals NHS Foundation Trust on 1 July 2004
- Aintree Hospitals NHS Trust, established 1 November 1991, was authorised as a foundation trust and renamed Aintree University Hospitals NHS Foundation Trust on 1 August 2006. It merged with Royal Liverpool and Broadgreen University Hospitals NHS Trust to form Liverpool University Hospitals NHS Foundation Trust on 1 October 2019.
- Alexandra Healthcare NHS Trust established 8 February 1994, dissolved 1 April 2000 and replaced by the Worcestershire Acute Hospitals NHS Trust.
- Allington NHS Trust, established 1 November 1991, merged into Local Health Partnerships NHS Trust on 1 April 1999.
- Andover District Community Health Care NHS Trust, established 4 November 1992, dissolved 1 April 2000, replaced by Winchester and Eastleigh Healthcare NHS Trust.
- Anglian Harbours NHS Trust, Yarmouth, established 1990, dissolved 1997
- Ascot University Hospitals NHS Foundation Trust
- Ashford Hospital NHS Trust merged into Ashford and St Peter's Hospitals NHS Trust in 1998
- Ashton, Leigh and Wigan Community Healthcare NHS Trust changed its name to Bridgewater Community Healthcare NHS Trust in 2011
- Avalon, Somerset, NHS Trust changed its name to Somerset Partnership National Health Service and Social Care Trust in 1999
- Avon Ambulance Service NHS trust merged into Great Western Ambulance Service NHS Trust in 2006
- Aylesbury Vale Community Healthcare NHS Trust merged into Buckinghamshire Mental Health NHS Trust in 2001

=== B ===
- Barnet and Chase Farm NHS Hospitals Trust acquired by Royal Free London NHS Foundation Trust in July 2014.
- Barnet Community Health Care NHS Trust merged into Barnet, Enfield and Haringey Mental Health NHS Trust 2001.
- Barnet, Enfield and Haringey Mental Health NHS Trust merged with Camden and Islington NHS Foundation Trust to form North London NHS Foundation Trust in November 2024.
- Barnsley Community & Priority Services NHS Trust dissolved 2002
- Barts and The London NHS Trust merged into Barts Health NHS Trust in 2012
- Bethlem and Maudsley NHS Trust merged into South London and Maudsley NHS Trust in 1999
- Bexley Community Health NHS Trust changed its name to Oxleas NHS Trust in 1995
- BHB Community NHS Trust merged into North East London NHS Trust in 2000
- Barts NHS Trust merged into Royal Hospital of St. Bartholomew, the Royal London Hospital, Whipps Cross Hospital and London Chest Hospital NHS Trust in 1994
- Basildon and Thurrock University Hospitals NHS Foundation Trust merged into Mid and South Essex NHS Foundation Trust on 1 April 2020
- Basingstoke and North Hampshire NHS Foundation Trust merged into Hampshire Hospitals NHS Foundation Trust in 2012
- Bassetlaw Hospital & Community Services NHS Trust merged into Doncaster and Bassetlaw Hospitals NHS Trust in 2000
- Bath and West Community NHS Trust dissolved 2001
- Bath Mental Health Care NHS Trust changed its name to Avon and Wiltshire Mental Health Partnership NHS Trust in 1999.
- Bay Community NHS Trust, Morecambe, dissolved 2001
- Bedford and Shires Health and Care NHS Trust merged into Bedfordshire & Luton Community NHS Trust in 1999
- Bedford Hospital NHS Trust was acquired by Luton and Dunstable Hospital NHS Foundation Trust, forming Bedfordshire Hospitals NHS Foundation Trust on 1 April 2020
- Bedfordshire and Hertfordshire Ambulance and Paramedic Service NHS Trust merged into East of England Ambulance Service NHS Trust in 2006
- Bedfordshire & Luton Community NHS Trust changed its name to Bedfordshire and Luton Mental Health and Social Care Partnership NHS Trust in 2005
- Bedfordshire and Luton Mental Health and Social Care Partnership NHS Trust was taken over by South Essex Partnership University NHS Foundation Trust in 2010
- Birmingham Children's Hospital NHS Foundation Trust merged into Birmingham Women's and Children's NHS Foundation Trust in 2017
- Birmingham Heartlands & Solihull NHS Trust became Heart of England NHS Foundation Trust in 2005
- Birmingham Heartlands Hospital NHS Trust merged into Birmingham Heartlands & Solihull NHS Trust in 1996
- Birmingham Specialist Community NHS Trust merged into Birmingham Community Healthcare NHS Trust 2002
- Birmingham Women's NHS Foundation Trust merged into Birmingham Women's and Children's NHS Foundation Trust in 2017
- Bishop Auckland Hospitals NHS Trust merged into South Durham NHS Trust in 1998
- Black Country Mental Health NHS Trust changed its name to Sandwell Mental Health National Health Service and Social Care Trust in 2003
- Blackburn Hyndburn and Ribble Valley Health Care NHS Trust merged into East Lancashire Hospitals NHS Trust in 2011
- Blackpool, Fylde and Wyre Hospitals NHS Trust became Blackpool Teaching Hospitals NHS Foundation Trust in 2007
- Blackpool Victoria Hospital NHS Trust merged into Blackpool, Fylde and Wyre Hospitals NHS Trust in 2002
- Blackpool, Wyre and Fylde Community Health Services NHS Trust merged into Blackpool, Fylde and Wyre Hospitals NHS Trust in 2002
- Bolton, Salford and Trafford Mental Health NHS Trust became Greater Manchester West Mental Health NHS Foundation Trust in 2008
- Bournewood Community and Mental Health Services Trust changed its name to North West Surrey Mental Health National Health Service Partnership Trust in 2002
- Bradford Community Health NHS Trust merged into Bradford District Care NHS Foundation Trust in 2002
- Brent, Kensington & Chelsea and Westminster Mental Health NHS Trust merged into Central and North West London NHS Trust in 2002
- Brighton and Sussex University Hospitals NHS Trust merged into University Hospitals Sussex NHS Foundation Trust in 2021
- Brighton Health Care NHS Trust merged into Brighton and Sussex University Hospitals NHS Trust
- Broadgreen Hospital NHS Trust merged into Royal Liverpool and Broadgreen University Hospitals NHS Trust in 1994
- Bromley Hospitals NHS Trust merged into South London Healthcare NHS Trust in 2009
- Buckinghamshire Hospitals NHS Trust changed its name to Buckinghamshire Healthcare NHS Trust in 2010
- Buckinghamshire Mental Health NHS Trust merged into Oxfordshire and Buckinghamshire Mental Health Partnership NHS Trust in 2006
- Burnley Health Care NHS Trust merged into East Lancashire Hospitals NHS Trust in 2011
- Burton Hospitals NHS Foundation Trust merged into University Hospitals of Derby and Burton NHS Foundation Trust in 2018
- Bury Health Care NHS Trust merged into Pennine Acute Hospitals NHS Trust in 2002

=== C ===
- Calderdale Healthcare NHS Trust merged into Calderdale and Huddersfield NHS Trust in 2001
- Calderstones Partnership NHS Foundation Trust taken over by Mersey Care NHS Trust in 2016
- Camden and Islington NHS Foundation Trust merged with Barnet, Enfield and Haringey Mental Health NHS Trust to form North London NHS Foundation Trust in November 2024.
- Canterbury and Thanet Community Healthcare NHS Trust changed its name to East Kent National Health Service and Social Care Partnership Trust in 2003
- Cardiothoracic Centre Liverpool NHS Trust changed its name to Liverpool Heart and Chest Hospital NHS Foundation Trust in 2008
- Carlisle Hospitals NHS Trust merged into North Cumbria Acute Hospitals NHS Trust in 2001
- Central Manchester Healthcare NHS Trust merged into Central Manchester and Manchester Children's University Hospitals NHS Trust in 2001
- Central Manchester University Hospitals NHS Foundation Trust merged into Manchester University NHS Foundation Trust 2017
- Central Middlesex Hospital NHS Trust merged into North West London Hospitals NHS Trust in 1999
- Central Nottinghamshire Healthcare NHS Trust dissolved 2001
- Central Sheffield University Hospitals NHS Trust merged into Sheffield Teaching Hospitals NHS Trust in 2001
- Chase Farm Hospitals NHS Trust merged into Barnet and Chase Farm NHS Hospitals Trust in 1999
- Cheshire Community Healthcare NHS Trust dissolved 2002
- Chester and Halton Community NHS Trust, established 21 December 1990, dissolved 1 April 2002.
- Chesterfield and North Derbyshire Royal Hospital trust became Chesterfield Royal Hospital NHS Foundation Trust in 2005
- Cheviot and Wansbeck NHS Trust merged into Northumbria Healthcare NHS Trust in 1998
- Chichester Priority Care Services NHS Trust changed its name to Sussex Weald and Downs NHS Trust in 1998
- Chorley & South Ribble NHS Trust merged into Lancashire Teaching Hospitals NHS Trust in 2002
- Churchill John Radcliffe NHS Trust changed its name to Oxford Radcliffe Hospital NHS Trust in 1994
- City and Hackney Community Services NHS Trust dissolved 2001
- City Hospital NHS Trust merged into Sandwell and West Birmingham Hospitals NHS Trust in 2002
- City Hospitals Sunderland NHS Foundation Trust merged into South Tyneside and Sunderland NHS Foundation Trust in April 2019
- Cleveland Ambulance NHS Trust merged into Tees, East and North Yorkshire Ambulance Service NHS Trust in 1999
- Colchester Hospital University NHS Foundation Trust merged into East Suffolk and North Essex NHS Foundation Trust in 2018
- CommuniCare NHS Trust, Accrington, dissolved 2002
- Community Healthcare Bolton NHS Trust dissolved 2002
- Community Health Care Service (North Derbyshire) NHS Trust was taken over by North Eastern Derbyshire Primary Care Trust in 2002
- Community Health Care: North Durham NHS Trust merged into North Durham Health Care NHS Trust in 1998
- Community Health Services, Southern Derbyshire NHS Trust merged into Derbyshire Mental Health Services NHS Trust in 2002
- Community Health Sheffield NHS Trust changed its name to Sheffield Care Trust in 2003
- Community Health South London NHS Trust dissolved 2002
- Cornwall and Isles of Scilly Mental Handicap NHS Trust, established 21 December 1990, changed its name to Cornwall and Isles of Scilly Learning Disabilities NHS Trust on 24 April 1993, and to Trecare NHS Trust on 18 July 1996; it was dissolved on 1 April 1999.
- Cornwall Community Healthcare NHS Trust, established 21 December 1990, dissolved 1 April 1993, its functions merged into Cornwall Healthcare NHS Trust.
- Cornwall Healthcare NHS Trust changed its name to Cornwall Partnership NHS Trust in 2002
- County Durham and Darlington Priority Services NHS Trust merged into Tees, Esk and Wear Valleys NHS Trust 2006
- Coventry and Warwickshire Ambulance NHS Trust merged with West Midlands Ambulance Service NHS Foundation Trust in 2006
- Coventry Healthcare NHS Trust dissolved 2002
- Crawley Horsham NHS Trust merged into Surrey and Sussex Healthcare NHS Trust in 1998
- Croydon Community NHS Trust, established 21 December 1990, changed its name to Croydon and Surrey Downs Community NHS Trust on 1 February 2000, and was dissolved on 1 April 2002 and replaced by Mayday Healthcare NHS Trust.
- Croydon and Surrey Downs Community NHS Trust, from 1 February 2000 the new name of Croydon Community NHS Trust, was dissolved on 1 April 2002 and replaced by Mayday Healthcare NHS Trust.
- Cumbria Ambulance Service NHS Trust merged into North West Ambulance Service NHS Trust in 2006
- Cumbria Partnership NHS Foundation Trust merged into North Cumbria Integrated Care NHS Foundation Trust in October 2019

=== D ===
- Dacorum and St Albans Community NHS Trust dissolved 1994
- Darlington Memorial Hospital NHS Trust merged into South Durham Health Care NHS Trust in 1998
- Derby City General Hospital NHS Trust merged into Southern Derbyshire Acute Hospitals NHS Trust in 1998
- Derby Hospitals NHS Foundation Trust merged into University Hospitals of Derby and Burton NHS Foundation Trust in 2018
- Derbyshire Ambulance Service NHS Trust merged into East Midlands Ambulance Service NHS Trust in 2006
- Derbyshire Mental Health Services NHS Trust became Derbyshire Healthcare NHS Foundation Trust in 2011
- Derbyshire Royal Infirmary NHS Trust merged into Southern Derbyshire Acute Hospitals NHS Trust in 1998
- Devon Ambulance Service NHS Trust merged into Westcountry Ambulance Services NHS Trust in 1993
- Dewsbury Health Care NHS Trust merged into Mid Yorkshire Hospitals NHS Trust in 2002
- Doncaster Healthcare NHS Trust changed its name to Doncaster and South Humber Healthcare NHS Trust in 1999
- Doncaster Royal Infirmary and Montagu Hospital NHS Trust became Doncaster and Bassetlaw Hospitals NHS Foundation Trust in 2004
- Doncaster & South Humber Healthcare NHS Trust merged into Rotherham Doncaster and South Humber NHS Foundation Trust in 2007
- Dorset Ambulance NHS Trust merged into South Western Ambulance Service NHS Trust in 2006
- Dorset Community NHS Trust dissolved 2001
- Dudley and Walsall Mental Health Partnership NHS Trust merged with Black Country Partnership NHS Foundation Trust to form Black Country Healthcare NHS Foundation Trust
- Dudley Integrated Health and Care NHS Trust dissolved in 2024
- Dudley Priority Health NHS Trust dissolved 2002
- Durham County Ambulance Service NHS Trust merged into North East Ambulance Service NHS Trust in 2006
- Durham County Priority Services NHS Trust changed its name to County Durham and Darlington Priority Services NHS Trust in 1999

=== E ===
- Ealing Hospital NHS Trust merged into London North West Healthcare NHS Trust in 2014
- Ealing, Hammersmith & Fulham Mental Health NHS Trust merged into West London Mental Health NHS Trust in 2001
- East Anglian Ambulance NHS Trust merged into East of England Ambulance Service NHS Trust in 2006
- East Berkshire Community NHS Trust dissolved 2002
- East Berkshire National Health Service Trust for People with Learning Disabilities merged into Berkshire Healthcare NHS Trust in 2000
- East Birmingham Hospital NHS Trust changed its name to Birmingham Heartlands Hospital NHS Trust in 1993
- East Gloucestershire NHS Trust merged into Gloucestershire Hospitals NHS Foundation Trust in 2002
- East Hertfordshire Health NHS Trust merged into East and North Hertfordshire NHS Trust in 2000
- East Kent Community NHS Trust changed its name to East Kent National Health Service and Social Care Partnership Trust in 2003
- East Kent National Health Service and Social Care Partnership Trust merged into Kent and Medway National Health Service and Social Care Partnership Trust in 2006
- East London and The City Mental Health NHS Trust became East London NHS Foundation Trust in 2000
- East Somerset NHS Trust became Yeovil District Hospital NHS Foundation Trust
- East Suffolk Local Health Services NHS Trust merged into Local Health Partnerships NHS Trust 1999
- East Surrey Healthcare NHS Trust merged into Surrey and Sussex Healthcare NHS Trust in 1998
- East Surrey Hospital and Community Healthcare NHS Trust changed its name to East Surrey Healthcare NHS Trust in 1995
- East Surrey Learning Disability and Mental Health Service NHS Trust changed its name to East Surrey Priority Care NHS Trust in 1995
- East Surrey Priority Care NHS Trust merged into Surrey and Sussex Healthcare NHS Trust 1998
- East Sussex County NHS Trust merged into Sussex Partnership NHS Trust in 2006
- East Sussex Hospitals NHS Trust changed its name to East Sussex Healthcare NHS Trust in 2011
- East Wiltshire Healthcare NHS Trust merged into Wiltshire & Swindon Health Care NHS Trust in 1999
- East Yorkshire Community Healthcare NHS Trust Hull & East Riding Community Health NHS Trust in 1999
- East Yorkshire Hospitals NHS Trust merged into Hull and East Yorkshire Hospitals NHS Trust in 1999
- Eastbourne & County Healthcare NHS Trust changed its name to East Sussex County NHS Trust in 2002
- Eastbourne Hospitals NHS trust merged into East Sussex Hospitals NHS Trust in 2002
- Eastern and Coastal Kent Community Health NHS Trust changed its name to Kent Community Health NHS Trust in 2011
- Enfield Community Care NHS Trust merged into Barnet, Enfield and Haringey Mental Health NHS Trust 2001
- Epsom Health Care merged into Epsom and St Helier University Hospitals NHS Trust in 1999
- Essex Ambulance Service NHS Trust merged into East of England Ambulance Service NHS Trust in 2006
- Essex and Hertfordshire Community NHS Trust dissolved 2001
- Essex Rivers Healthcare NHS Trust became Colchester Hospital University NHS Foundation Trust in 2008
- Exeter & District Community Health Services NHS Trust dissolved 2001

=== F ===
- First Community NHS Trust, established 21 December 1990, was dissolved 1 April 2001, replaced by South Staffordshire Healthcare NHS trust.
- Forest Healthcare Community NHS Trust merged into North East London NHS Trust in 2000
- Fosse Health, Leicestershire Community NHS trust merged into Leicestershire and Rutland Healthcare NHS Trust in 1998
- Foundation NHS Trust, Mid Staffordshire, merged into South Staffordshire Healthcare NHS Trust 2001
- Freeman Group of Hospitals NHS Trust merged into Newcastle upon Tyne Hospitals NHS Foundation Trust in 1998
- Frenchay Healthcare NHS Trust merged into North Bristol NHS Trust in 1999
- Frimley Park Hospital NHS Foundation Trust became Frimley Health NHS Foundation Trust in October 2014
- Furness Hospitals NHS Trust merged into Morecambe Bay Hospitals NHS Trust in 1998

=== G ===
- Gateshead Community Health NHS Trust became Gateshead Healthcare NHS Trust in 1994
- Gateshead Healthcare NHS Trust dissolved 1998
- Glenfield Hospital NHS Trust merged into University Hospitals of Leicester NHS Trust in 1999
- Gloucestershire Ambulance Services NHS Trust merged into Great Western Ambulance Service NHS Trust in 2006
- Gloucestershire Care Services NHS Trust merged into Gloucestershire Health and Care NHS Foundation Trust in October 2019
- Gloucestershire Partnership NHS Trust, established 1 April 2002 became 2gether NHS Foundation Trust in 2007
- Gloucestershire Royal NHS Trust merged into Gloucestershire Hospitals NHS Foundation Trust in 2002
- Good Hope Hospital NHS Trust merged into Heart of England NHS Foundation Trust in 2007
- Grantham and District Hospital NHS Trust merged into United Lincolnshire Hospitals NHS Trust in 2000
- Great Western Ambulance Service NHS Trust merged with South Western Ambulance Service NHS Trust in 2013
- Greater Manchester Ambulance Services NHS Trust merged into North West Ambulance Service NHS Trust in 2006
- Greater Manchester West Mental Health NHS Foundation Trust became Greater Manchester Mental Health NHS Foundation Trust in 2017
- Greenwich Healthcare NHS Trust changed its name to Queen Elizabeth Hospital NHS Trust in 2001
- Grimsby Health NHS Trust changed its name to North East Lincolnshire NHS Trust in 1996
- Guild Community Healthcare NHS Trust merged into Lancashire Care NHS Trust in 2000
- Guy's and Lewisham NHS Trust was divided between Lewisham Hospital NHS Trust and Guy's and St Thomas' NHS Foundation Trust in 1993

=== H ===
- Halton General Hospital NHS Trust merged into North Cheshire Hospitals NHS Trust in 2001
- Hammersmith Hospitals NHS Trust merged into Imperial College Healthcare NHS Trust in 2007
- Hampshire Ambulance Service NHS Trust merged into South Central Ambulance Service NHS Trust in 2006
- Hampshire Partnership NHS Foundation Trust merged into Southern Health NHS Foundation Trust in 2011
- Harefield Hospital NHS Trust merged into Royal Brompton and Harefield NHS Foundation Trust in 1998
- Haringey Healthcare NHS Trust merged into Barnet, Enfield and Haringey Mental Health NHS Trust 2001
- Harrow and Hillingdon Healthcare Trust merged into Central and North West London NHS Foundation Trust in 2002
- Harrow Community Health Services NHS Trust merged into Harrow and Hillingdon Healthcare Trust 1994
- Hartlepool and East Durham NHS Trust merged into North Tees and Hartlepool NHS Foundation Trust in 1999
- Hartlepool and Peterlee Hospitals NHS Trust merged into Hartlepool and East Durham NHS Trust 1996
- Hartlepool Community Care NHS Trust merged into Hartlepool and East Durham NHS Trust 1996
- Hastings and Rother NHS Trust merged into East Sussex Hospitals NHS Trust in 2002
- Havering Hospitals NHS Trust merged into Barking, Havering and Redbridge University Hospitals NHS Trust in 2000
- Heart of England NHS Foundation Trust merged with University Hospitals Birmingham NHS Foundation Trust in 2018
- Heatherwood and Wexham Park Hospitals NHS Foundation Trust was taken over by Frimley Health NHS Foundation Trust October 2014
- Heathlands Mental Health NHS trust merged into Surrey Hampshire Borders NHS Trust in 1998
- Hereford and Worcester Ambulance Service NHS Trust merged with West Midlands Ambulance Service NHS Foundation Trust in 2006
- Hereford Hospitals NHS Trust changed its name to Wye Valley NHS Trust in 2011
- Herefordshire Community Health NHS Trust dissolved 2000
- Hillingdon Community Health NHS trust merged into Harrow and Hillingdon Healthcare Trust 1994
- Hinchingbrooke Health Care NHS Trust managed by Circle Health from 2010; franchise ended in 2015, with management returned to the NHS; acquired by Peterborough and Stamford Hospitals NHS Foundation Trust, forming North West Anglia NHS Foundation Trust in 2017
- Homewood NHS Trust merged into Bournewood Community and Mental Health Services Trust 1995
- Horizon NHS Trust, Hertfordshire, dissolved 2001
- Horton General Hospital NHS Trust merged into Oxford Radcliffe Hospitals NHS Trust in 1998
- Hounslow and Spelthorne Community and Mental Health NHS Trust joined West London Mental Health NHS Trust in 2002
- Huddersfield Health Care Services NHS Trust merged into Calderdale and Huddersfield NHS Trust in 2001
- Hull & East Riding Community Health NHS Trust changed its name to Humber Mental Health Teaching NHS Trust in 2005
- Hull and East Yorkshire Hospitals NHS Trust changed its name to Hull University Teaching Hospitals NHS Trust in March 2019
- Hull and Holderness Community Health NHS Trust merged into Hull & East Riding Community Health NHS Trust in 1999
- Humber Mental Health Teaching NHS Trust became Humber NHS Foundation Trust in 2010
- Humberside Ambulance Service NHS Trust split into Tees, East and North Yorkshire Ambulance Service NHS Trust (North Humberside) and Lincolnshire Ambulance Service NHS Trust (South Humberside) in 1999

=== I ===
- Invicta Community Care NHS Trust merged into West Kent National Health Service and Social Care Trust in 2002
- Ipswich Hospital NHS Trust merged into East Suffolk and North Essex NHS Foundation Trust in 2018
- Isle of Wight Community Healthcare NHS Trust merged into Isle of Wight Primary Care Trust in 2006

=== K ===
- Kent and Canterbury Hospitals NHS Trust merged into East Kent Hospitals NHS Trust in 1999
- Kent Ambulance Trust merged into South East Coast Ambulance Service NHS Trust in 2006
- Kent and Sussex Weald NHS Trust merged into Maidstone and Tunbridge Wells NHS Trust in 2000
- Kent Community Health NHS Trust became Kent Community Health NHS Foundation Trust in March 2015
- Kidderminster Health Care NHS Trust merged with Worcestershire Acute Hospitals NHS Trust in 1999
- King's Lynn & Wisbech Hospitals NHS Trust became Queen Elizabeth Hospital King's Lynn NHS Trust in 2005
- Kings Mill Centre for Health Care Services NHS Trust changed its name to Sherwood Forest Hospitals NHS Trust in 2001
- Kingston and District Community NHS Trust dissolved 2001

=== L ===
- Lambeth Healthcare NHS Trust merged into South London and Maudsley NHS Trust in 1999
- Lancashire Ambulance Service NHS Trust merged into North West Ambulance Service NHS Trust in 2006
- Lancashire Care NHS Foundation Trust merged into Lancashire and South Cumbria NHS Foundation Trust in 2019
- Lancaster Acute Hospitals NHS Trust merged into Morecambe Bay Hospitals NHS Trust in 1998
- Lancaster Priority Services NHS Trust merged into Bay Community NHS Trust in 1998
- Leeds Community and Mental Health Services Teaching NHS Trust became Leeds and York Partnership NHS Foundation Trust in 2007
- Leeds General Infirmary and Associated Hospitals NHS Trust changed its name to United Leeds Teaching Hospitals NHS Trust in 1991
- Leeds Partnerships NHS Foundation Trust changed its name to Leeds and York Partnership NHS Foundation Trust in 2011
- Leicester General Hospital NHS Trust merged into University Hospitals of Leicester NHS Trust in 1999
- Leicester Royal Infirmary NHS trust merged into University Hospitals of Leicester NHS Trust in 1999
- Leicestershire Ambulance and Paramedic Service NHS Trust merged into East Midlands Ambulance Service NHS Trust in 2006
- Leicestershire & Rutland Healthcare NHS Trust changed its name to Leicestershire Partnership NHS Trust in 2002
- Leicestershire Mental Health Service NHS Trust merged into Leicestershire and Rutland Healthcare NHS Trust in 1998
- Lewisham and Guy's Mental Health NHS Trust merged into South London and Maudsley NHS Trust in 1999
- Lewisham Healthcare NHS Trust merged into Lewisham and Greenwich NHS Trust in 2014
- Lifecare NHS Trust, established 21 December 1990, dissolved 1 April 1999.
- Lifespan Cambridge NHS Trust merged into Cambridgeshire and Peterborough Mental Health Partnership in 2002
- Lincoln and Louth NHS Trust merged into United Lincolnshire Hospitals NHS Trust in 2000
- Lincoln District Healthcare NHS Trust merged into Lincolnshire Healthcare NHS Trust in 2001
- Lincoln Hospitals NHS Trust changed its name to Lincoln and Louth NHS Trust in 1996
- Lincolnshire Ambulance and Health Transport Service NHS Trust merged into East Midlands Ambulance Service NHS Trust in 2006
- Lincolnshire Healthcare NHS Trust changed its name to Lincolnshire Partnership NHS Trust in 2002
- Liverpool Obstetric and Gynaecology Services NHS trust changed its name to Liverpool Women's Hospital NHS Trust in 1994
- Local Health Partnerships NHS Trust changed its name to Suffolk Mental Health Partnership NHS Trust in 2004
- Louth and District Healthcare NHS Trust merged into Lincoln and Louth NHS Trust in 1996
- Luton and Dunstable Hospital NHS Foundation Trust acquired Bedford Hospital NHS Trust, forming Bedfordshire Hospitals NHS Foundation Trust on 1 April 2020

=== M ===
- Maidstone Priority Care NHS trust merged into Invicta Community Care NHS Trust in 1997
- Manchester Central Hospitals and Community Care NHS Trust changed its name to Central Manchester Healthcare NHS Trust in 1993
- Manchester Children's Hospital NHS Trust merged into Central Manchester and Manchester Children's University Hospitals Trust in 2001
- Manchester Mental Health and Social Care Trust taken over by Greater Manchester West Mental Health NHS Foundation Trust 2016
- Mancunian Community Health NHS Trust dissolved 2001 and divided between three Manchester primary care trusts
- Mayday Healthcare NHS, established 22 January 1993, changed its name to Croydon Health Services NHS Trust on 1 October 2010.
- Medway Community Healthcare is now classified as an Independent provider and not an NHS trust
- Mental Health Foundation of Mid Staffordshire NHS Trust changed its name to Foundation NHS Trust in 1993
- Mental Health Services of Salford NHS Trust merged into Bolton, Salford and Trafford Mental Health NHS Trust in 2003
- Mersey Regional Ambulance Service NHS Trust merged into North West Ambulance Service NHS Trust in 2006
- Merton and Sutton Community NHS Trust merged into South West London Community NHS Trust in 1999
- Mid Anglia Community Health NHS Trust merged into Local Health Partnerships NHS Trust 1999
- Mid Essex Community & Mental Health NHS Trust dissolved 2001
- Mid Essex Community Health NHS Trust was dissolved in 1993 into the Mid Essex Community & Mental Health NHS Trust
- Mid Essex Hospital Services NHS Trust merged into Mid and South Essex NHS Foundation Trust on 1 April 2020
- Mid Kent Healthcare NHS Trust merged into Maidstone and Tunbridge Wells NHS Trust in 2000
- Mid Staffordshire NHS Foundation Trust dissolved 2014
- Mid Sussex NHS Trust merged into Brighton and Sussex University Hospitals NHS Trust in 2002
- Milton Keynes Community Health NHS trust dissolved 2000
- Morecambe Bay Hospitals NHS Trust became University Hospitals of Morecambe Bay NHS Trust in 2005
- Mount Vernon & Watford Hospitals NHS Trust merged into West Hertfordshire Hospitals NHS Trust in 2000
- Mulberry NHS trust merged into Lincoln District Healthcare NHS Trust 1999

=== N ===
- New Possibilities NHS Trust dissolved 2002
- Newcastle City Health NHS Trust merged into Newcastle, North Tyneside and Northumberland Mental Health NHS trust in 2001
- Newcastle Mental Health Trust merged into Newcastle City Health NHS Trust in 1994
- Newcastle, North Tyneside and Northumberland Mental Health NHS trust merged into Northumberland, Tyne and Wear NHS Trust in 2006
- Newham Community Health Services NHS Trust dissolved 2001
- Newham University Hospital NHS Trust merged with Barts Health NHS Trust 2012
- NHS Direct NHS Trust was closed in 2014
- Norfolk Ambulance NHS Trust merged into East Anglian Ambulance NHS Trust in 1993
- Norfolk and Waveney Mental Health Partnership NHS Trust merged with Suffolk Mental Health Partnership NHS Trust in 2012 to form Norfolk and Suffolk NHS Foundation Trust
- Norfolk Mental Health Care NHS Trust changed its name to Norfolk and Waveney Mental Health Partnership NHS Trust in 2004
- North and East Devon Partnership NHS Trust changed its name to Devon Partnership NHS Trust in 2002
- North Cheshire Hospitals NHS trust became Warrington and Halton Hospitals NHS Foundation Trust in 2008
- North Cumbria Acute Hospitals NHS Trust is now called North Cumbria University Hospitals NHS Trust
- North Cumbria University Hospitals NHS Trust acquired by Cumbria Partnership NHS Foundation Trust, becoming North Cumbria Integrated Care NHS Foundation Trust in October 2019
- North Bristol NHS trust merged into University hospitals Bristol and Weston NHS Foundation trust to form Bristol NHS Foundation Trust in July 2026
- North Downs Community Health NHS Trust merged into Surrey Hampshire Borders NHS Trust in 1998
- North Durham Acute Hospitals NHS Trust dissolved 1998
- North Durham Health Care NHS Trust merged into County Durham and Darlington NHS Trust 2002
- North East Essex Mental Health NHS Trust dissolved 2001
- North East Lincolnshire NHS Trust dissolved 2001
- North East Worcestershire Community HealthCare NHS Trust merged into Worcestershire Community Healthcare NHS Trust 1996
- North Essex Partnership University NHS Foundation Trust merged into Essex Partnership University NHS Foundation Trust in 2017
- North Hampshire Hospitals NHS Trust became Basingstoke and North Hampshire NHS Foundation Trust in 2006
- North Hampshire Loddon Community NHS Trust dissolved 2001
- North Hertfordshire NHS Trust merged into East and North Hertfordshire NHS Trust in 2000
- North Kent Healthcare NHS Trust merged into Thames Gateway NHS Trust in 1998
- North Lakeland Healthcare NHS Trust merged into North Cumbria Acute Hospitals NHS Trust in 2001
- North Manchester Healthcare NHS Trust merged into Pennine Acute Hospitals NHS Trust in 2002, but from 2020 North Manchester General Hospital is managed by Manchester University NHS Foundation Trust
- North Mersey Community NHS Trust dissolved 2002
- North Sefton & West Lancashire Community NHS Trust merged into Lancashire Care NHS Trust in 2000
- North Staffordshire Hospital Centre NHS Trust changed its name to North Staffordshire Hospital NHS Trust in 1993 and again to University Hospital of North Staffordshire NHS Trust in 2003
- North Tees NHS Trust merged into North Tees and Hartlepool NHS Trust in 1999
- North Tyneside Health Care NHS Trust merged into Northumbria Health Care National Health Service Trust in 1998
- North Warwickshire NHS Trust dissolved 2002
- North West Anglia Healthcare NHS Trust merged into Cambridgeshire and Peterborough Mental Health Partnership in 2002
- North West London Hospitals NHS Trust merged into London North West Healthcare NHS Trust in 2014
- North West London Mental Health NHS Trust merged into Brent, Kensington & Chelsea and Westminster Mental Health NHS Trust 1998
- North West Surrey Mental Health National Health Service Partnership Trust merged into Surrey and Borders Partnership NHS Trust in 2005
- North Yorkshire Ambulance Service NHS Trust merged into Tees, East and North Yorkshire Ambulance Service NHS Trust in 1999
- Northallerton Health Services NHS Trust dissolved 2002
- Northampton Community Healthcare NHS Trust dissolved 2001
- Northern Birmingham Community Health NHS Trust merged into Birmingham Specialist Community NHS Trust in 1999
- Northern Birmingham Mental Health Trust merged into Birmingham and Solihull Mental Health NHS Trust in 2003
- Northern Devon Healthcare NHS Trust merged with Royal Devon and Exeter NHS Foundation Trust in April 2022 to form Royal Devon University Healthcare NHS Foundation Trust
- Northern General Hospital NHS Trust merged into Sheffield Teaching Hospitals NHS Foundation Trust in 2001
- Northgate and Prudhoe NHS Trust merged into Northumberland, Tyne and Wear NHS Trust in 2006
- Northgate NHS trust merged into Northgate and Prudhoe NHS Trust 1994
- Northumberland Community Health NHS Trust merged into Northumbria Healthcare NHS Trust in 1998
- Northumberland Mental Health NHS Trust merged into Newcastle, North Tyneside and Northumberland Mental Health NHS trust in 2001
- Northumbria Ambulance Service NHS Trust merged into North East Ambulance Service NHS Trust in 2006
- Norwich Community Health Partnership NHS Trust dissolved 2001
- Northwick Park and St. Mark's NHS Trust merged into North West London Hospitals NHS Trust in 1999
- Northwick Park Hospital NHS Trust was renamed Northwick Park and St. Mark's NHS Trust in 1994
- Nottingham City Hospital NHS Trust merged into Nottingham University Hospitals NHS Trust in 2006
- Nottingham Community Health NHS Trust
- Nottingham Healthcare NHS Trust dissolved 2001
- Nottinghamshire Ambulance Service NHS Trust merged into East Midlands Ambulance Service NHS Trust in 2006
- Nottinghamshire Healthcare NHS Trust became Nottinghamshire Healthcare NHS Foundation Trust in March 2015
- Nuffield Orthopaedic Centre NHS Trust merged into Oxford University Hospitals NHS Trust in 2011

=== O ===
- Oldham NHS Trust merged into Pennine Acute Hospitals NHS Trust in 2002
- Optimum Health Services NHS Trust merged into South London and Maudsley NHS Trust in 1999
- Oxford Radcliffe Hospitals NHS Trust changed its name to Oxford University Hospitals NHS Trust in 2011
- Oxfordshire Ambulance NHS Trust merged into South Central Ambulance Service NHS Trust in 2006
- Oxfordshire and Buckinghamshire Mental Health Partnership NHS Trust became Oxford Health NHS Foundation Trust in 2008
- Oxfordshire Community Health NHS Trust dissolved 2001
- Oxfordshire Learning Disability NHS Trust merged with Southern Health NHS Foundation Trust in 2012
- Oxfordshire Mental Healthcare NHS Trust changed its name to Oxfordshire and Buckinghamshire Mental Health Partnership NHS Trust in 2006

=== P ===
- Parkside Health NHS Trust, Westminster, dissolved 2002
- Pathfinder NHS trust changed its name to South West London and St George's Mental Health NHS Trust in 1999
- Pennine Acute Hospitals NHS Trust became part of Northern Care Alliance NHS Group in 2017
- Peterborough and Stamford Hospitals NHS Foundation Trust acquired Hinchingbrooke Hospital NHS Trust, forming North West Anglia NHS Foundation Trust in 2017
- Peterborough Hospitals NHS Trust became Peterborough and Stamford Hospitals NHS Foundation Trust in 2004
- Phoenix NHS Trust dissolved 2000
- Pilgrim Health NHS Trust merged into United Lincolnshire Hospitals NHS Trust in 2000
- Pinderfields & Pontefract NHS Trust merged into Mid Yorkshire Hospitals NHS Trust in 2002
- Pinderfields Hospitals NHS Trust merged into Pinderfields & Pontefract NHS Trust in 1997
- Plymouth Community Services NHS Trust dissolved 2001
- Plymouth Hospitals NHS Trust renamed as University Hospitals Plymouth NHS Trust 2018
- Pontefract Hospitals NHS Trust merged into Pinderfields & Pontefract NHS Trust in 1997
- Poole Hospital NHS Foundation Trust merged into University Hospitals Dorset NHS Foundation Trust in 2020
- Portsmouth Healthcare NHS Trust dissolved 2002
- Premier Health NHS Trust merged into South Staffordshire Healthcare NHS Trust 2001
- Preston Acute Hospitals NHS Trust merged into Lancashire Teaching Hospitals NHS Trust in 2002
- Princess Royal Hospital NHS Trust merged into Shrewsbury and Telford Hospital NHS Trust in 2004
- Priority Health Care, Wearside NHS Trust merged into South of Tyne and Wearside Mental Health NHS Trust in 2002

=== Q ===
- Queen Elizabeth Hospital NHS Trust merged into South London Healthcare NHS Trust in 2009
- Queen's Medical Centre, Nottingham, University Hospital NHS Trust merged into Nottingham University Hospitals NHS Trust in 2006
- Queen Mary's Sidcup NHS Trust merged into South London Healthcare NHS Trust in 2009

=== R ===
- Radcliffe Infirmary NHS Trust became Oxford Radcliffe Hospitals NHS Trust in 1999
- Ravensbourne Priority Health NHS trust dissolved 2001 and transferred to Bromley Primary Care Trust
- Redbridge Healthcare NHS Trust merged into Barking, Havering and Redbridge University Hospitals NHS Trust in 2000
- Richmond, Twickenham and Roehampton Healthcare NHS Trust merged into merged into South West London Community NHS Trust in 1999
- Riverside Community Healthcare NHS Trust, Fulham, dissolved 2002
- Riverside Mental Health NHS Trust merged into Brent, Kensington & Chelsea and Westminster Mental Health NHS Trust 1998
- Rochdale Healthcare NHS Trust merged into Pennine Acute Hospitals NHS Trust in 2002
- Rockingham Forest NHS Trust dissolved 2001 became Northamptonshire Healthcare NHS Foundation Trust
- Rotherham Priority Health Service NHS Trust dissolved 2002
- Royal Berkshire Ambulance NHS Trust merged into South Central Ambulance Service NHS Trust in 2006
- The Royal Bournemouth and Christchurch Hospitals NHS Foundation Trust merged into University Hospitals Dorset NHS Foundation Trust in 2020
- Royal Brompton Hospital NHS Trust merged into Royal Brompton and Harefield NHS Trust in 1998
- Royal Cornwall Hospitals and West Cornwall Hospital changed its name to Royal Cornwall Hospitals NHS Trust in 1992
- Royal Devon and Exeter NHS Foundation Trust merged with Northern Devon Healthcare NHS Trust in April 2022 to form Royal Devon University Healthcare NHS Foundation Trust
- Royal Hospital of St. Bartholomew, the Royal London Hospital and London Chest Hospital NHS Trust changed its name to Barts and The London NHS Trust in 1999
- Royal Hull Hospitals NHS Trust merged into Hull and East Yorkshire Hospitals NHS Trust in 1999
- Royal Liverpool and Broadgreen University Hospitals NHS Trust merged into Liverpool University Hospitals NHS Foundation Trust in October 2019
- Royal Liverpool Children's NHS Trust became Alder Hey Children's NHS Foundation Trust in 2008
- Royal Liverpool NHS Trust merged into Royal Liverpool and Broadgreen University Hospitals NHS Trust in 1994
- Royal London Homoeopathic Hospital NHS Trust merged with Parkside Health NHS Trust in 2002
- Royal London Hospital and Associated Community Services NHS Trust merged into Royal Hospital of St. Bartholomew, the Royal London Hospital and London Chest Hospital NHS Trust in 1994
- Royal Manchester Children's Hospital Trust merged with Central Manchester and Manchester Children's University Hospitals NHS Foundation Trust in 2009
- Royal National Hospital for Rheumatic Diseases NHS Foundation Trust merged into Royal United Hospital Bath NHS Foundation Trust in 2015.
- Royal National Throat, Nose and Ear Hospital NHS Trust dissolved 1996 and became part of the Royal Free London NHS Foundation Trust
- Royal Shrewsbury Hospitals NHS Trust merged into Shrewsbury and Telford Hospital NHS Trust in 2004
- Royal Surrey County & St Lukes Hospital NHS Trust changed its name to Royal Surrey County Hospital NHS Foundation Trust in 1996
- Royal United Hospital Bath NHS Trust became Royal United Hospital Bath NHS Foundation Trust in 2014
- Royal Victoria Infirmary and Associated Hospitals NHS trust became part of Newcastle upon Tyne Hospitals NHS Foundation Trust in 1998
- Royal West Sussex NHS Trust merged into Western Sussex Hospitals NHS Foundation Trust in 2009
- Rugby NHS Trust merged into North Warwickshire NHS Trust in 1998

=== S ===
- Salford Community Health Care NHS Trust dissolved 2001
- Salford Royal NHS Foundation Trust became part of Northern Care Alliance NHS Group in 2017
- Sandwell Healthcare NHS Trust merged into Sandwell and West Birmingham Hospitals NHS Trust in 2002
- Sandwell Mental Health National Health Service and Social Care Trust
- Scarborough and North East Yorkshire NHS Trust merged with York Teaching Hospital NHS Foundation Trust 2012
- Scunthorpe & Goole Hospitals NHS Trust dissolved 2001
- Scunthorpe Community Health Care NHS Trust was abolished 1999
- Severn NHS Trust merged into Gloucestershire Hospitals NHS Foundation Trust in 2002
- Sheffield Care Trust became Sheffield Health & Social Care NHS Foundation Trust in 2008, and then Sheffield Health Partnership University NHS Foundation Trust in 2025
- Shropshire Community and Mental Health Services NHS Trust dissolved 2002
- Shropshire Mental Health NHS Trust merged into Shropshire Community and Mental Health Services NHS Trust in 1998
- Solihull Healthcare NHS Trust dissolved 2001
- Somerset Partnership NHS Foundation Trust merged into Somerset NHS Foundation Trust in 2020
- South Bedfordshire Community Health Care NHS Trust merged into Bedfordshire & Luton Community NHS Trust in 1999
- South Birmingham Community Health NHS Trust changed its name to Southern Birmingham Community NHS Trust in 1994
- South Birmingham Mental Health NHS Trust merged into Birmingham and Solihull Mental Health NHS Trust in 2003
- South Buckinghamshire NHS Trust merged into Buckinghamshire Hospitals NHS Trust 2002
- South Cumbria Community and Mental Health NHS Trust merged into Bay Community NHS Trust in 1998
- South Devon Healthcare NHS Foundation Trust merged into Torbay and South Devon NHS Foundation Trust in October 2015
- South Downs Health NHS Trust merged into Sussex Community NHS Trust in 2010
- South Durham Health Care NHS Trust merged into South Durham NHS Trust 1996
- South Durham NHS Trust merged into County Durham and Darlington NHS Trust 2002
- South East London Mental Health NHS Trust changed its name to Lewisham and Guy's Mental Health NHS Trust on 1994
- South Essex Mental Health and Community Care NHS Trust became South Essex Partnership University NHS Trust in 2006
- South Essex Partnership University NHS Foundation Trust merged into Essex Partnership University NHS Foundation Trust in 2017
- South Kent Community Healthcare NHS Trust merged into Canterbury and Thanet Community Healthcare NHS Trust in 1998
- South Kent Hospitals NHS Trust merged into East Kent Hospitals NHS Trust in 1999
- South Lincolnshire Community and Mental Health Services NHS Trust merged into Lincolnshire Healthcare NHS Trust in 2001
- South London Healthcare NHS Trust dissolved 1 October 2013
- South Manchester University Hospital Trust became University Hospital of South Manchester NHS Foundation Trust in 2006
- South of Tyne and Wearside Mental Health NHS Trust merged into Northumberland, Tyne and Wear NHS Trust in 2006
- South Staffordshire and Shropshire Healthcare NHS Foundation Trust, formed as South Staffordshire Healthcare NHS Trust on 19 January 2001, merged with Staffordshire and Stoke on Trent Partnership NHS Trust to form Midlands Partnership NHS Foundation Trust on 1 June 2018
- South Tees Community and Mental Health NHS Trust dissolved 1999
- South Tyneside NHS Foundation Trust merged into South Tyneside and Sunderland NHS Foundation Trust in April 2019
- South Warwickshire Combined Healthcare NHS Trust dissolved 2002
- South Warwickshire Health Care NHS Trust merged into South Warwickshire Combined Healthcare NHS Trust in 1998
- South Warwickshire Mental Health NHS Trust merged into South Warwickshire Combined Healthcare NHS Trust in 1998
- South West Durham Mental Health NHS Trust merged into South Durham NHS Trust 1996
- South West London Community NHS Trust dissolved 2002
- South West Yorkshire Mental Health NHS Trust became South West Yorkshire Partnership NHS Foundation Trust in 2009
- South Worcestershire Community NHS Trust merged into Worcestershire Community Healthcare NHS Trust 1996
- South Yorkshire Metropolitan Ambulance and Paramedic Service NHS Trust merged into Yorkshire Ambulance Service NHS Trust in 2006
- Southend Community Care Services NHS trust merged into South Essex Mental Health and Community Care NHS Trust in 2000
- Southend University Hospital NHS Foundation Trust merged into Mid and South Essex NHS Foundation Trust on 1 April 2020
- Southern Birmingham Community Health NHS Trust merged into Birmingham Specialist Community NHS Trust in 1999
- Southern Derbyshire Acute Hospitals NHS Trust became Derby Hospitals NHS Foundation Trust in 2004
- Southern Derbyshire Community and Mental Health Services NHS Trust changed its name to Derbyshire Mental Health Services NHS Trust in 2002
- Southampton Community Health Service NHS Trust dissolved 2002
- Southampton University Hospitals NHS Trust became University Hospital Southampton NHS Foundation Trust in 2011
- Southmead Health Services NHS Trust merged into North Bristol NHS Trust in 1999
- Southport and Formby Community Health Services NHS Trust merged into Sefton and Lancashire Community NHS Trust in 1999
- Southport and Formby NHS Trust merged into Southport and Ormskirk Hospital NHS Trust in 1999
- Southport and Ormskirk Hospital NHS Trust merged into Mersey and West Lancashire Teaching Hospitals NHS Trust in 2023.
- St Albans & Hemel Hempstead NHS Trust merged into West Hertfordshire Hospitals NHS Trust in 2000
- St George's Healthcare NHS Trust became St George's University Hospitals NHS Foundation Trust in February 2015
- St Helens & Knowsley Community Health NHS Trust dissolved 2002
- St Helens and Knowsley Teaching Hospitals NHS Trust merged into Mersey and West Lancashire Teaching Hospitals NHS Trust in 2023.
- St. Helier NHS Trust merged into Epsom and St Helier University Hospitals NHS Trust in 1999
- St. James's and Seacroft University Hospitals NHS Trust merged into Leeds Teaching Hospitals NHS Trust in 1998
- St Mary's Hospital NHS Trust merged into Imperial College Healthcare NHS Trust in 2007
- St Peter's Hospital NHS Trust merged with Ashford Hospital NHS Trust in 1998
- St Thomas' Hospital NHS Trust merged into Guy's and St Thomas' NHS Foundation Trust in 1993
- Staffordshire Ambulance Service NHS Trust merged with West Midlands Ambulance Service NHS Foundation Trust in 2007
- Staffordshire and Stoke-on-Trent Partnership NHS Trust merged with South Staffordshire and Shropshire Healthcare NHS Foundation Trust in 2018 to form Midlands Partnership NHS Foundation Trust
- Stockport Acute Services NHS Trust merged into Stockport NHS Trust 2000
- Stockport Healthcare NHS Trust merged into Stockport NHS Trust 2000
- Stoke Mandeville Hospital NHS Trust merged into Buckinghamshire Hospitals NHS Trust 2002
- Suffolk Mental Health Partnership NHS Trust merged with Norfolk and Waveney Mental Health Partnership NHS Trust in 2012 to form Norfolk and Suffolk NHS Foundation Trust
- Surrey Ambulance Service NHS Trust merged into South East Coast Ambulance Service NHS Trust in 2006
- Surrey Hampshire Borders NHS Trust merged into Surrey and Borders Partnership NHS Trust in 2005
- Surrey Heartlands NHS Trust merged into Surrey Oaklands NHS Trust in 1998
- Surrey Oaklands NHS Trust merged into Surrey and Borders Partnership NHS Trust in 2005
- Sussex Ambulance Service NHS Trust merged into South East Coast Ambulance Service NHS Trust in 2006
- Sussex Weald and Downs NHS Trust merged into West Sussex Health and Social Care NHS Trust in 2002
- Swindon & Marlborough NHS Trust became Great Western Hospitals NHS Foundation Trust in 2008

=== T ===
- Tameside and Glossop Acute Services NHS Trust became Tameside Hospital NHS Foundation Trust in 2008
- Tameside and Glossop Community and Priority Services NHS Trust merged into Lancashire Care NHS Trust in 2001
- Tameside Hospital NHS Foundation Trust became Tameside and Glossop Integrated Care NHS Foundation Trust in 2017
- Taunton and Somerset NHS Foundation Trust merged into Somerset NHS Foundation Trust in 2020
- Teddington Memorial Hospital and Community NHS Trust dissolved 2001
- Tees & North East Yorkshire NHS Trust merged into Tees, Esk and Wear Valleys NHS Trust 2006
- Tees, East and North Yorkshire Ambulance Service NHS Trust merged (apart from Teesside) into Yorkshire Ambulance Service NHS Trust in 2006. The Tees locality merged into North East Ambulance Service NHS Trust
- Thames Gateway NHS Trust merged into West Kent National Health Service and Social Care Trust in 2002
- Thameside Community Health Care NHS Trust merged into South Essex Mental Health and Community Care NHS Trust in 2000
- Thameslink Healthcare Services NHS Trust merged into Thames Gateway NHS Trust in 1998
- Thanet Health Care NHS Trust merged into East Kent Hospitals NHS Trust in 1999
- Torbay and Southern Devon Health and Care NHS Trust was taken over by South Devon Healthcare NHS Foundation Trust to form Torbay and South Devon NHS Foundation Trust in October 2015
- Tower Hamlets Healthcare NHS Trust dissolved 2001
- Trafford Healthcare NHS Trust taken over by Central Manchester and Manchester Children's University Hospitals NHS Foundation Trust in 2012
- Trecare NHS Trust dissolved 1999
- Two Shires Ambulance NHS Trust merged into South Central Ambulance Service NHS Trust in 2006

=== U ===
- United Bristol Healthcare NHS Trust became University Hospitals Bristol NHS Foundation Trust in 2008
- United Leeds Teaching Hospitals NHS Trust merged into Leeds Teaching Hospitals NHS Trust in 1998
- Unityne Health NHS Trust merged into Newcastle City Health NHS Trust in 1994
- University Hospital Aintree NHS Trust became Aintree University Hospitals NHS Foundation Trust in 2006
- University Hospital of South Manchester NHS Foundation Trust merged into Manchester University NHS Foundation Trust 2017
- University Hospitals Bristol NHS Foundation Trust merged with Weston Area Health Trust in 2020 to form University Hospitals Bristol and Weston NHS Foundation Trust
- University Hospitals Bristol and Weston NHS Foundation Trust merged with North Bristol NHS Trust to form Bristol NHS Foundation Trust in July 2026
- University Hospital of North Staffordshire NHS Trust merged into University Hospitals of North Midlands NHS Trust 2014

=== W ===
- Wakefield and Pontefract Community Health NHS Trust merged into South West Yorkshire Mental Health NHS Trust in 2002
- Walsall Community Health NHS Trust dissolved 2002
- Walsgrave Hospitals NHS Trust changed its name to University Hospitals Coventry and Warwickshire NHS Trust in 2000
- Wandsworth Community Health NHS Trust merged into South West London Community NHS Trust in 1999
- Warrington Hospital NHS Trust merged into North Cheshire Hospitals NHS Trust in 2001
- Warrington Community Health Care (NHS) Trust became 5 Boroughs Partnership NHS Foundation Trust in 2002
- Warwickshire Ambulance Service NHS Trust changed its name to Coventry and Warwickshire Ambulance NHS Trust in 2004
- Weald of Kent Community NHS Trust merged into Invicta Community Care NHS Trust in 1997
- Wellhouse NHS Trust merged into Barnet and Chase Farm NHS Hospitals Trust in 1999
- West Berkshire Priority Care NHS Trust merged into Berkshire Healthcare NHS Trust in 2000
- West Cheshire NHS Trust merged into Wirral and West Cheshire Community NHS Trust in 1997
- West Cumbria Health Care NHS Trust merged into North Cumbria Acute Hospitals NHS Trust in 2001
- West Dorset Community Health NHS Trust merged into Dorset Community NHS Trust in 1994
- West Dorset General Hospital NHS Trust became Dorset County Hospital NHS Foundation Trust in 2004
- West Dorset Mental Health NHS Trust merged into Dorset Community NHS Trust in 1994
- West Hampshire NHS Trust changed its name to Hampshire Partnership NHS Trust in 2004
- West Herts Community Health NHS Trust dissolved 2001
- West Kent National Health Service and Social Care Trust merged into Kent and Medway National Health Service and Social Care Partnership Trust in 2006
- West Lambeth Community Care NHS trust changed its name to Lambeth Healthcare NHS Trust in 1996
- West Lancashire NHS trust merged into Southport and Ormskirk Hospital NHS Trust in 1999
- West Lindsey NHS trust merged into merged into Lincoln District Healthcare NHS Trust 1999
- West London Healthcare NHS Trust merged into Brent, Kensington & Chelsea and Westminster Mental Health NHS Trust 1998
- West London Mental Health NHS Trust changed its name to West London NHS Trust in 2018
- West Middlesex University Hospital NHS Trust taken over by Chelsea and Westminster Hospital NHS Foundation Trust in September 2015
- West Sussex Health and Social Care NHS Trust merged into Sussex Partnership NHS Trust in 2006
- West Yorkshire Metropolitan Ambulance Service NHS Trust merged into Yorkshire Ambulance Service NHS Trust in 2006
- Westcountry Ambulance Services NHS Services merged into South Western Ambulance Service NHS Trust in 2006
- Western Sussex Hospitals NHS Foundation Trust merged into University Hospitals Sussex NHS Foundation Trust in 2021
- Westmorland Hospitals NHS trust merged into Morecambe Bay Hospitals NHS Trust in 1998
- Weston Area Health NHS Trust; merged into University Hospitals Bristol and Weston NHS Foundation Trust in 2020
- Weston Park Hospital NHS Trust merged into Central Sheffield University Hospitals NHS Trust in 1999
- Weybourne Community NHS Trust merged into Bournewood Community and Mental Health Services Trust 1995
- Whipps Cross University Hospital NHS Trust merged with Barts Health NHS Trust 2012
- Wigan & Leigh Health Services NHS Trust merged into Wrightington, Wigan and Leigh NHS Trust in 2001
- Wiltshire Ambulance Service NHS Trust merged into Great Western Ambulance Service NHS Trust in 2006
- Wiltshire & Swindon Health Care NHS Trust dissolved in 2002
- Wiltshire Health Care NHS Trust merged into Wiltshire & Swindon Health Care NHS Trust in 1999
- Winchester & Eastleigh Healthcare NHS Trust was acquired by Basingstoke and North Hampshire NHS Foundation Trust in 2011
- Wirral & West Cheshire Community NHS Trust merged into Cheshire and Wirral Partnership NHS Trust in 2002
- Wolverhampton Healthcare NHS Trust became Royal Wolverhampton Hospitals NHS Trust in 2002
- Wolverley NHS Trust, Kidderminster, dissolved 1995
- Worcestershire Community and Mental Health NHS Trust
- Worcestershire Community Healthcare NHS Trust merged into Worcestershire Community and Mental Health NHS Trust in 2000
- Worcestershire Mental Health Partnership NHS Service merged into Worcestershire Health and Care NHS Trust in 2011
- Worthing and Southlands Hospitals NHS Trust merged into Western Sussex Hospitals NHS Foundation Trust in 2009
- Worthing Priority Care Services Trust merged into West Sussex Health and Social Care NHS Trust in 2002
- Wrightington Hospital NHS Trust merged into Wrightington, Wigan and Leigh NHS Foundation Trust

=== Y ===
- Yeovil District Hospital NHS Foundation Trust merged into Somerset NHS Foundation Trust in April 2023.
