= South Essex Partnership University NHS Foundation Trust =

Former UK healthcare trust

Somerset Partnership NHS Foundation Trust
- Type: Mental health trust community health trust
- Established: 1 May 2008
- Budget: £324m
- Hospitals
- Chair: Stephen Ladyman
- Chief executive: Peter Lewis
- Staff: 7,000

South Essex Partnership University NHS Foundation Trust was an NHS foundation trust providing mental health, learning disability, social care and community services across Bedfordshire, Essex, Luton and Suffolk, England.

It was involved in running the Aldeburgh Cottage Hospital in Suffolk through a partnership or joint venture with Serco and others.

It was named by the Health Service Journal as one of the top hundred NHS trusts to work for in 2015. At that time it had 5,084 full-time equivalent staff and a sickness absence rate of 5.07%. 65% of staff recommend it as a place for treatment and 55% recommended it as a place to work.

It merged with North Essex Partnership University NHS Foundation Trust in April 2017 forming a new organisation Essex Partnership University NHS Foundation Trust. “Significant” service reconfiguration is expected to follow.

== See also ==
- Healthcare in Bedfordshire
- Healthcare in Essex
- List of NHS trusts
