= Mental health trust =

Social care services for people with mental health disorders in England

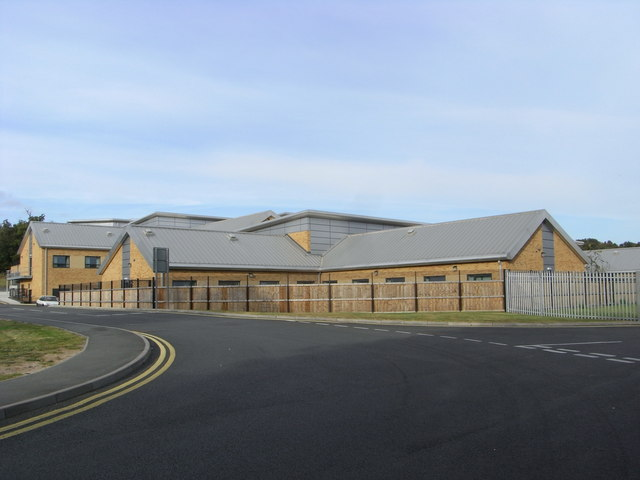
- Birmingham & Solihull Mental Health Trust, Treatment Suite The new psychiatric unit that has replaced the one displaced by the University Hospital's new super hospital. This latter is now approaching completion (at least externally) as of October 2009.
- Region served: United Kingdom

A mental health trust provides health and social care services for people with mental health disorders in England.

There are 54 mental health trusts. They are commissioned and funded by clinical commissioning groups.

Patients usually access the services of mental health trusts through their GP (primary care medical doctor) or via a stay in hospital. Most of the services are for people who live in the region, although there may be specialist services for the whole of the UK or services that accept national referrals. Mental Health Trusts may or may not provide inpatient psychiatric hospital services themselves (they may form part of a general hospital run by a hospital trust). The various trusts work together and with local authorities and voluntary organisations to provide care.

== Services ==
Services provided by mental health trusts vary but typically include:

- Counselling sessions - one-to-one or in a group
- Courses - such as on how to deal with stress, anger, and bereavement. Courses may also be available for carers of those with mental health disorders
- Resources - such as leaflets and books on mental health issues
- Psychotherapy - treatment sessions with a therapist. Commonly cognitive behavioural therapy
- Family support - providing support to the family, friends, and carers of those with a mental health problem.
- Community drug and alcohol clinics - helping people to cope with addiction
- Community mental health houses - supported housing to help people live in the community
- Day hospitals and day centres - short-term outpatient sessions with a psychiatrist, clinical psychologist or other mental health professional, and drop-in centres for peer support and therapeutic activities.

If more specialist hospital treatment is required, Mental Health Trusts will help with rehabilitation back into the community (social inclusion). Trusts may operate community mental health teams, which may include Crisis Resolution and Home Treatment, assertive outreach and early intervention services.

The Mental Health Act 1983, Mental Health Act 2007 and Mental Capacity Act 2005 cover the rights, assessment and treatment of people diagnosed with a mental disorder who are judged as requiring to be detained ("sectioned") or treated against their will. A mental health trust will typically have a Mental Health Act team responsible for ensuring that the Act is administered correctly, including to protect the rights of inpatients, or of service users in the community who may now be under community treatment orders. The Care Quality Commission is the body with overall national responsibility for inspecting and regulating the operation of the mental health act by the regional trusts.

== Capacity ==
According to the British Medical Association the number of beds for psychiatric patients was reduced by 44% between 2001 and 2017. An average of 726 mental health patients were placed in institutions away from their home area in 2016.

Children of school age are normally treated through Child and Adolescent Mental Health Services (CAMHS), usually organised by local government area. Young people who become psychiatric in-patients frequently are treated in adult wards due to lack of beds in wards that are suitable for people of their ages. Young people frequently stay in hospital wards when they are fit for discharge because the mental health support facilities they need are not available where they live.

== List of MHTs ==
These are the mental health trusts in the NHS in England in 2017 (note that many have foundation trust status – a type of trust that has more independence from government):

- ^{2}gether NHS Foundation Trust
- 5 Boroughs Partnership NHS Foundation Trust
- Avon and Wiltshire Mental Health Partnership NHS Trust
- Barnet, Enfield and Haringey Mental Health NHS Trust
- Berkshire Healthcare NHS Foundation Trust
- Birmingham and Solihull Mental Health NHS Foundation Trust
- Bradford District Care Trust
- Cambridgeshire and Peterborough NHS Foundation Trust
- Camden and Islington NHS Foundation Trust
- Central and North West London NHS Foundation Trust
- Cheshire and Wirral Partnership NHS Foundation Trust
- Cornwall Partnership NHS Foundation Trust
- Coventry and Warwickshire Partnership NHS Trust
- Cumbria, Northumberland, Tyne and Wear NHS Foundation Trust
- Derbyshire Healthcare NHS Foundation Trust
- Devon Partnership NHS Trust
- Dorset HealthCare University NHS Foundation Trust
- Dudley and Walsall Mental Health Partnership NHS Trust
- East London NHS Foundation Trust
- Greater Manchester Mental Health NHS Foundation Trust
- Humber Teaching NHS Foundation Trust
- Isle of Wight NHS Trust
- Kent and Medway NHS and Social Care Partnership Trust
- Lancashire Care NHS Foundation Trust
- Leeds and York Partnership NHS Foundation Trust
- Leicestershire Partnership NHS Trust
- Lincolnshire Partnership NHS Foundation Trust
- Mersey Care NHS Trust
- Midlands Partnership University NHS Foundation Trust
- Norfolk and Suffolk NHS Foundation Trust
- North East London NHS Foundation Trust
- North Essex Partnership University NHS Foundation Trust
- North Staffordshire Combined Healthcare NHS Trust
- Northamptonshire Healthcare NHS Foundation Trust
- North Cumbria Integrated Care NHS Foundation Trust
- Nottinghamshire Healthcare NHS Foundation Trust
- Oxford Health NHS Foundation Trust
- Oxleas NHS Foundation Trust
- Pennine Care NHS Foundation Trust
- Rotherham Doncaster and South Humber NHS Foundation Trust
- Sheffield Health Partnership University NHS Foundation Trust
- Somerset Partnership NHS Foundation Trust
- South Essex Partnership University NHS Foundation Trust
- South London and Maudsley NHS Foundation Trust
- South Staffordshire and Shropshire Healthcare NHS Foundation Trust
- South West London and St George's Mental Health NHS Trust
- South West Yorkshire Partnership NHS Foundation Trust
- Southern Health NHS Foundation Trust
- Surrey and Borders Partnership NHS Foundation Trust
- Sussex Partnership NHS Foundation Trust
- Tavistock and Portman NHS Foundation Trust
- Tees, Esk and Wear Valleys NHS Foundation Trust
- West London NHS Trust
- Worcestershire Health and Care NHS Trust

== See also ==
- National Mental Health Development Unit
- Category:NHS mental health trusts
