= Bradford District Care NHS Foundation Trust =

Healthcare organisation in Bradford, England

- Type: Mental health and community health trust
- Established: 1 May 2015
- Headquarters: New Mill, Victoria Road, Saltaire, Bradford, BD18 3LD
- Budget: £132,600,000
- Chair: Dr Linda Patterson OBE FRCP
- Chief executive: Therese Patten
- Website: www.bdct.nhs.uk

Bradford District Care NHS Foundation Trust provides mental health, dentistry, community health, and specialist learning disability services in Bradford, Keighley, Ilkley and Craven in Yorkshire, England. It achieved foundation trust status in May 2015.

== Services ==
The trust opened an older people's mental health ward in May 2014 at the Airedale Centre for Mental Health, in the grounds of Airedale Hospital. The new Bracken Ward has 22 en-suite rooms, arranged across separate corridors for men and women, and a 'therapeutic' kitchen for activities such as baking.

As of 2013, Bradford children continued to have the poorest oral health in Yorkshire and the Humber, which was attributed to the high levels of deprivation in the area. Swarngit Shahid, clinical director of the trust said "Research suggests there are clear links between levels of deprivation and poor oral health, and many of the factors that cause this also cause poor general health."

== Performance ==
The trust received an overall 'Good' rating from the Care Quality Commission after an inspection over three days in mid-June 2014. The end-of-life service was described as outstanding.

It was named by the Health Service Journal as one of the top hundred NHS trusts to work for in 2015. At that time it had 2,384 full-time equivalent staff and a sickness absence rate of 5.3%. 64% of staff recommend it as a place for treatment and 60% recommended it as a place to work.
