= Coventry and Warwickshire Partnership NHS Trust =

Healthcare trust in England

- Type: Mental health trust
- Established: 1 October 2006
- Headquarters: Wayside House, Wilsons Lane, Coventry, CV6 6NY
- Budget: £225 million
- Chair: Eamonn Kelly
- Chief executive: Mel Coombes
- Staff: 4,530
- Website: www.covwarkpt.nhs.uk

Coventry and Warwickshire Partnership NHS Trust was formed in 2006 and took over community services from NHS Coventry in April 2011. It provides mental health and learning disability services for people in Coventry and Warwickshire, England.

A Commissioning for Quality and Innovation scheme established by the Trust in 2011 showed less than 50% of the mental health budget was being spent on local services because many patients were being placed outside the area in expensive facilities. 400 out of area patients were identified. By March 2014, 134 had been returned to the area and the number being sent out of the area was reduced because more specialist beds were provided locally. During the three years of the project a total of £10.5m was saved. The project has now been expanded to include patients with dementia and learning difficulties.

In December 2013 it was announced that the trust would be among the first to trial the Care Quality Commission's planned approach to inspecting mental health services because Monitor and the NHS Trust Development Authority wanted assurance on the quality of the services they provide before progressing their foundation trust applications.

A report to Coventry City Council's health and social care scrutiny board in January 2015 criticised mental health service for children and young people. Some were waiting up to a year for treatment in the face of rising demand, with a 20 per cent rise in referrals from 2013/4.

== See also ==
- List of NHS trusts
- Healthcare in West Midlands
- University Hospital Coventry
