= Cathia Jenainati =

Feminist author

Academic background
- Education: BS, Biology, MA, English Literature, American University of Beirut; BA, American literature, Lebanese American University; PhD, Comparative Literary Studies, 2003, University of Warwick
- Thesis: Narrating the self: memory as narrative strategy in the fiction of Margaret Atwood (2003)

Cathia Jenainati is a feminist author and an academic. She is professor of gender and leadership at the University of Gloucestershire.

== Early life and education ==
Jenainati earned her Bachelor of Science and Master's degree from the American University of Beirut (AUB) before enrolling at the University of Warwick for her PhD. She also earned a Bachelor of Arts degree from Lebanese American University in English Literature.

== Career ==
Upon receiving her PhD, Jenainati joined the faculty of English and Comparative Literary Studies at the University of Warwick. During her tenure at the university, she founded the School for Cross-faculty Studies, including the Global Sustainable Development and Liberal Arts divisions, and founded the Institute for Global Sustainable Development. Prior to leaving the institution, she was appointed a Founding Fellow of the Warwick International Higher Education Academy from 2015 until 2018 and was nominated for their Inspirational Leadership Award. Jenainati also sits on various boards including chairing the UK’s Interdisciplinary Group and the International Advisory Board for the Dean and Management of AUB which meets once a year in Amsterdam.

From 2019 to 2023, Jenainati was dean of the school of arts and sciences at the Lebanese American University (LAU).

As of 2025, Jenainati is professor of gender and leadership at the University of Gloucestershire, and heads the university's school of business, computing and social science. She is an associate non-executive director at the Gloucestershire Health and Care NHS Foundation Trust.

In 2019, Jenainati published Introducing Feminism: A Graphic Guide with illustrations by Judy Groves.
