= Greater Manchester Mental Health NHS Foundation Trust =

NHS foundation trust in Greater Manchester

- Type: NHS foundation trust and mental health trust
- Budget: £522.9 million
- Chair: Tony Warne
- Chief executive: Karen Howell OBE
- Staff: 4,750
- Website: www.gmmh.nhs.uk

Greater Manchester Mental Health NHS Foundation Trust is an NHS foundation trust in North West England, with headquarters in Prestwich, near Manchester. It provides mental health services in Bolton, Salford and Trafford, inpatient alcohol and drug recovery services in Prestwich as well as community services in Salford, Trafford, Cumbria, Wigan and Leigh, Blackburn with Darwen and Central Lancashire. It also provides secure services for adults and various specialist mental health services.

The Trust's Greenway Unit at Trafford General Hospital was the subject of a King's Fund project "Enhancing the Healing Environment" in 2005.

== Performance ==
Nursing placements at the trust received ‘outstanding’ ratings in a report published in 2010 following an inspection by the Nursing and Midwifery Council.

It was named by the Health Service Journal as one of the top hundred NHS trusts to work for in 2015. At that time it had 2,650 full-time equivalent staff and a sickness absence rate of 6.5%. 61% of staff recommend it as a place for treatment and 59% recommended it as a place to work.

In January 2020, the trust received a rating of "Good" by the Care Quality Commission. It was found to have done "Outstanding" work with substance misuse patients, and had a "Good" rating for in-patient care, but was rated as "Requires Improvement" for its community mental health services for young people and working-age adults.

A January 2021 investigation by the Manchester Evening News reported that the trust suffered from staff shortages, with minutes from a March 2020 board meeting detailing a discrepancy of over 300 out of 4,731 total staff in January 2020. One senior member of staff told the newspaper that "barely any" of the community teams in the region have a full complement of nurses. The MEN highlighted two cases of patients receiving inadequate attention in particular: Zak Bennett-Eko, a paranoid schizophrenic who had asked to be sectioned over mental health concerns and later threw his 11-month old son into the River Irwell in September 2019 due to a belief he was "the devil"; and Eltiona Skana, who fatally stabbed 8-year-old Emily Jones in March 2020 at Queen's Park in Bolton. Skana also had been treated for paranoid schizophrenia but after her nurse took sick leave, Skana was not seen by a mental health professional for three months prior to the attack, during which time she stopped taking her medication.

Panorama broadcast a programme in September 2022 filmed by an undercover Panorama reporter embedded in the Edenfield high security unit which showed apparent humiliation, verbal abuse, mocking and assault of patients. 12 staff were sacked and 18 more suspended from duties pending further investigation. The unit normally has 600 staff looking after 200 adult patients on 11 adult wards.

== Development ==
In 2016 it took over Manchester Mental Health and Social Care Trust. and in January 2017 changed its name to Greater Manchester Mental Health NHS Foundation Trust.

The trust was one of the biggest beneficiaries of Boris Johnson's announcement of capital funding for the NHS in August 2019, with an allocation of £72.3 million for a new adult mental health inpatient unit on the North Manchester site.

== See also ==
- Healthcare in Greater Manchester
- List of NHS trusts
