= Healthcare in Gloucestershire =

Healthcare in Gloucestershire was the responsibility of two clinical commissioning groups, covering Gloucestershire and South Gloucestershire, until July 2022. The health economy of Gloucestershire has always been linked with that of Bristol.

== Sustainability and transformation plans ==
The Gloucestershire sustainability and transformation partnership was one of four integrated care systems established by NHS England in May 2018.

== Health inequality ==
People living in the most deprived areas of the city of Gloucester – Barton and Tredworth, Matson, Podsmead, Tuffley and Westgate – live almost 14 years less than those in the most affluent areas like Longlevens and Quedgeley.

== History ==
From 1947 to 1974, NHS services in Gloucestershire were managed by the South-West Regional Hospital Board. In 1974 the boards were abolished and replaced by regional health authorities; Gloucestershire came under the South Western RHA. Regions were reorganised in 1996 and Gloucestershire still came under the South Western Regional Health Authority. From 1974 there was a single area health authority covering the county. From 1982 it was split into two district health authorities, Cheltenham and District DHA and Gloucester DHA. There were four primary care trusts established in the county in 2002: South Gloucestershire PCT, West Gloucestershire PCT, Cotswold & Vale PCT, and Cheltenham & Tewkesbury PCT. They were managed by the Avon, Gloucestershire and Wiltshire Strategic Health Authority and in 2006 three were merged into Gloucestershire PCT while South Gloucestershire PCT remained a separate organization. In 2013, PCTs were abolished and replaced by clinical commissioning groups. In 2022, the CCGs were in turn abolished and replaced with integrated care systems.

Bristol, North Somerset and South Gloucestershire formed a sustainability and transformation plan area in March 2016 with Robert Woolley, Chief Executive of University Hospitals Bristol NHS Foundation Trust as its leader. The remainder of Gloucestershire formed a separate area under Mary Hutton, the Accountable Officer of Gloucestershire CCG.

== Commissioning ==
The implementation of Transforming Community Services in the county was controversial. The transfer to the community interest company Gloucester Care Services was challenged in the courts by local resident and service user Michael Lloyd on behalf of a well organised campaign, Stroud Against The Cuts, which claimed that social enterprises were a stepping stone to privatisation, allowing the private sector to compete for contracts after only a few years. It was successfully argued in court by David Lock QC that while services could be commissioned from NHS providers without the need for a procurement process, it had been unlawful for them to be transferred to a social enterprise without competition. It was therefore decided to set up a new NHS trust, Gloucestershire Care Services NHS Trust.

Gloucestershire CCG supported an "arts on prescription" service, known as Artlift, to prevent chronic conditions from becoming acute. Patients with long term conditions such as depression or chronic pain were referred for ten weeks of arts activity. The scheme had better completion and attendance rates than other health referral programmes such as exercise schemes.

The CCGs for Bristol, North Somerset and South Gloucestershire merged in April 2018. Gloucestershire Care Services NHS Trust merged with ^{2}gether NHS Foundation Trust (which also covered Herefordshire) in October 2019 to form Gloucestershire Health and Care NHS Foundation Trust.

=== Service restrictions ===
In 2015, a survey by the Health Service Journal showed that 34 of 188 CCGs who responded had restricted access to some services. Restrictions were usually introduced by a number of CCGs acting together across an area. Gloucestershire and Bristol CCGs were proposing restricted access to acupuncture, adenoidectomy and post-operative physiotherapy.

It was reported in 2017 that NHS cuts in South Gloucestershire would increase delays to cancer treatment and include cuts to care for children with complex needs. Patients would wait longer for non-urgent operations. Holly Maltby of 38 Degrees said, "These plans shed light on just how seriously patient care in South Gloucestershire could be affected. They also begin to paint a picture for how services in other areas of England are likely to be hit too – with cancer treatment and children in need affected."

== Primary care ==
As of 2020, there are 27 GP surgeries in South Gloucestershire. Out-of-hours services formerly provided by South Western Ambulance Service NHS Foundation Trust were transferred to Care UK in 2017.

== Community care ==
Gloucestershire Health and Care NHS Foundation Trust is the main provider.

Palliative care is provided by Sue Ryder at Leckhampton Court in Cheltenham, Longfield in Minchinhampton, Great Oaks in Coleford, and Longfield's Hospice in Stroud.

== Mental health ==
Gloucestershire Health and Care NHS Foundation Trust provides mental health and learning disability services throughout Gloucestershire and Herefordshire.

== Hospital provision ==
Gloucestershire Hospitals NHS Foundation Trust and North Bristol NHS Trust provide most of the county's acute care. Specialist stroke services in the county were centralised at Gloucestershire Royal Hospital from summer 2012.

In 2021, Gloucestershire Integrated Care System decided to centralise emergency general surgery, vascular surgery and acute medicine at Gloucestershire Royal Hospital, and to move orthopaedic and gastroenterology services to Cheltenham General Hospital. Cheltenham, where 34 beds would be closed, would keep a reduced-hours emergency department. Gloucestershire Royal would have 41 extra beds.

== See also ==
- Category:Health in Gloucestershire
