= Queen Elizabeth Hospital, King's Lynn =

Hospital in Norfolk, England

Queen Elizabeth Hospital
- Queen Elizabeth Hospital King's Lynn NHS Foundation Trust
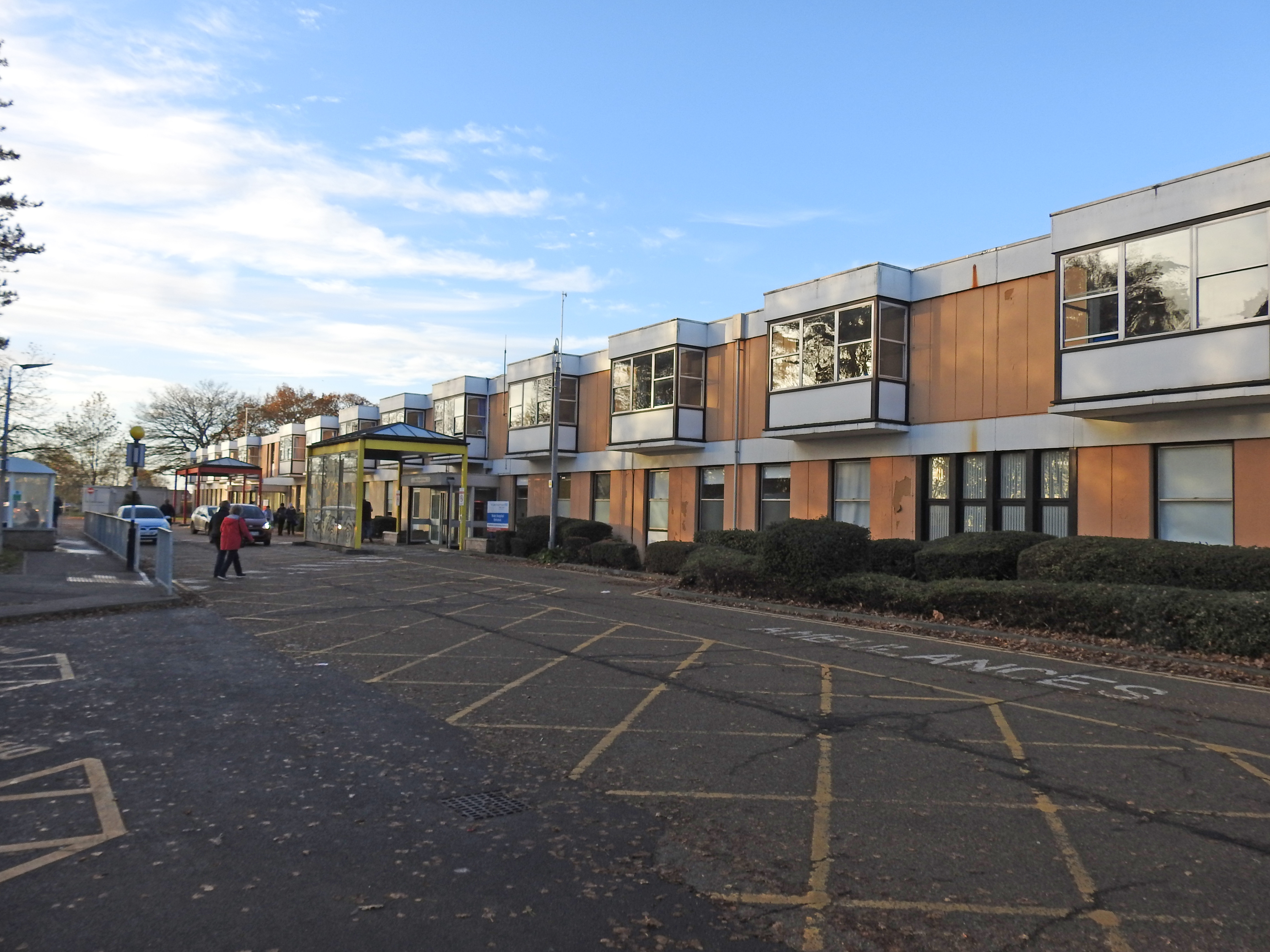
- Queen Elizabeth Hospital

- Shown in Norfolk

Geography
- Location: King's Lynn, England
- Coordinates: 52.7566°N 0.4471°E

Organisation
- Care system: NHS
- Type: District General
- Affiliated university: University of East Anglia, University of Cambridge

Services
- Emergency department: Yes
- Beds: 515

History
- Founded: 1980

Links
- Website: www.qehkl.nhs.uk
- Lists: Hospitals in England

Queen Elizabeth Hospital is a district general hospital situated on the eastern outskirts of King's Lynn, Norfolk, England. It serves a broad catchment area spanning West Norfolk, parts of Breckland District, South Holland District in Lincolnshire, and the northern section of Fenland District in Cambridgeshire—covering approximately 1,500 square kilometres and serving a population of around 250,000. The hospital is operated by the Queen Elizabeth Hospital King's Lynn NHS Foundation Trust. It is named in honour of Queen Elizabeth the Queen Mother, not Queen Elizabeth II.

== History ==
The Queen Elizabeth Hospital was constructed to replace the former King's Lynn hospital on Hospital Walk, a town centre site originally founded in 1835 as the West Norfolk and Lynn Hospital, later known as the West Norfolk and King's Lynn Hospital. The new facility opened in 1980 as a two-storey building, with a roof constructed from reinforced autoclaved aerated concrete (RAAC) planks—a lightweight material commonly used in public buildings during the mid-20th century.

In February 1998, the Queen Mother was admitted to the hospital after fracturing her hip at nearby Sandringham House; she was later transferred to King Edward VII's Hospital in London. The Arthur Levin Day Surgery Centre was officially opened by Queen Elizabeth II on 11 January 1999. Later that month, the Queen Mother returned to the hospital for treatment following a series of nosebleeds, during which her nose was cauterised.

During her Golden Jubilee in 2002, the Queen—who traditionally spent accession day in private at Windsor Castle—opened the hospital's £1.2 million Macmillan Cancer Unit. In January 2003, she was admitted for a knee scan and subsequently transferred to King Edward VII's Hospital in London for surgery to remove torn cartilage.

Other members of the royal family have also visited the hospital. Princess Anne opened the £5 million Critical Care Unit in 2005. The Roxburgh Children's Day Centre, offering outpatient care for children and a comprehensive sexual health clinic, opened in summer 2008. On 1 February 2011, the hospital was granted Foundation Trust status.

The hospital was originally designed for a life expectancy of 30 years. In March 2021, after 40 years of use, its reinforced autoclaved aerated concrete (RAAC) plank roof was declared structurally unsafe, and hundreds of jack posts had to be installed. The foundation trust began lobbying for funding to replace the hospital with a new building. Shortly afterwards, it had to evacuate and temporarily close the critical care unit (CCU) while additional steel roof supports were installed.

Around a decade earlier, proposals had been considered to replace the hospital as it approached the end of its intended lifespan. A site between the existing campus and the Gaywood River was identified, but NHS authorities later concluded that refurbishing parts of the current site would be more cost-effective than constructing a new hospital. Subsequent development focused on priority areas, including an expanded Accident & Emergency department, a new breast care unit, and additional office space.

In response to the roof crisis, the Trust applied for £22 million in loan finance to fund a multi-year replacement programme, described by its director of resources as "substantial works over five to six years." The project was complicated by the presence of asbestos, extensive rooftop equipment, and the need to decant wards during phased construction.

On 25 May 2023, it was announced that the hospital would be rebuilt due to the presence of significant amounts of RAAC throughout the structure. The Guardian noted that a 2020 proposal to rebuild Queen Elizabeth Hospital was not funded by HM Treasury during Rishi Sunak's term as Chancellor of the Exchequer, despite a "catastrophic" grade of risk and a warning that an incident was "likely".

== Services ==
The hospital site contains the main hospital building as well as the Fermoy Unit and the Arthur Levin Day Surgery Centre, which are both joined to the main hospital building by a long service corridor. The hospital has a full accident and emergency department. The hospital has MRI and CT scanners on site for imaging and diagnosis. There are 7 operating theatres and 19 inpatient wards. The wards are all named after local villages and towns. In March 2022, the hospital had over 500 beds, and the trust had around 4,000 staff and volunteers. The hospital works in partnership with Norwich Medical School, the School of Nursing and Midwifery at the University of East Anglia and the School of Clinical Medicine of the University of Cambridge.

== Performance ==
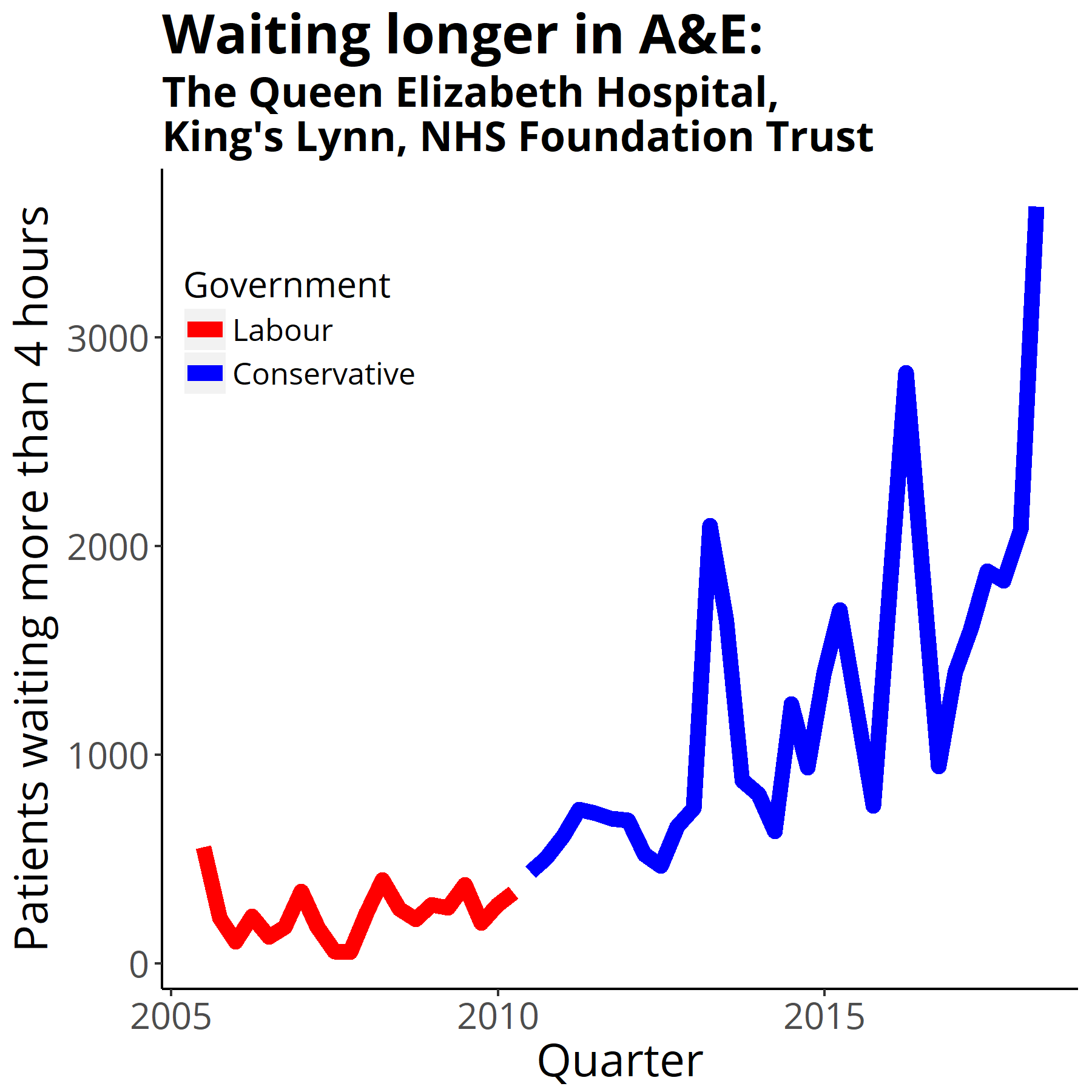
Four-hour target in the emergency department quarterly figures from NHS England Data from https://www.england.nhs.uk/statistics/statistical-work-areas/ae-waiting-times-and-activity/

The Care Quality Commission, formerly the Healthcare Commission, reviews hospitals annually and rates a hospital on two points: "Use of Resources" (which is based on finances) and "Quality of Service" (which is based on clinical performance). These two points are rated on a scale of "weak", "Fair", "Good" and "Excellent". In the 2007/08 Healthcare Commission's review, it rated the Queen Elizabeth Hospital's "Use of Resources" as "Weak" and "Quality of Service" as "Good". The "weak" rating for use of resources was due primarily to the hospital's debts, now all cleared. The "good" rating for quality of service is indicative of its clinical performance and waiting times. The Queen Elizabeth Hospital had good patient satisfaction rates, is nationally acknowledged for its infection control excellence and arrangements for keeping patients safe. The Critical Care Centre has consistently been rated amongst the best in the country by external ICNARC review (ICNARC Casemix Programme).

The hospital has an international reputation for research into the prevention of ventilator-associated pneumonia. The Accident and Emergency department in the hospital in 2014-15 performed at 90.8% against the four-hour target. The Arthur Levin Day Surgery Centre is consistently ranked amongst the top in the country. MRSA rates are now also amongst the best in the country, with the biggest reduction. Research by a consultant at the QEH, Professor Lynn Liebowitz, led to a dramatic reduction in MRSA cases, and is now assisting the Department of Health to reduce MRSA in other hospitals. In March 2014 it marked two years MRSA free.

In October 2013, the trust was warned after consistently failing to meet the national standards of quality and safety by the Care Quality Commission and put in the highest risk category. It was placed in special measures by Monitor. A contingency planning team was sent to the hospital in March 2014, tasked with making recommendations to the foundation trust regulator about options for ensuring sustainable patient services at the trust.

It was removed from special measures in August 2015 after an inspection found "marked improvement in the quality of care being delivered".

In 2014/5 the trust was given a loan of £16.8 million by the Department of Health which is supposed to be paid back in five years.

It was rated as having the lowest index of digital maturity of any NHS hospital trust in England in April 2016.

In 2018, it was put back in special measures, with particular concerns around maternity services. Staffing shortfalls—exceeding 40% on multiple wards—prompted the trust to contemplate suspending non-urgent surgeries during 2018. In July 2019 the Care Quality Commission extended the special measures after inspectors said they found an "extremely concerning" lack of improvement, with "significant concerns and risks to patients within the urgent and emergency service, medicine, end of life care and gynaecology".

It was announced in February 2022 that the hospital was out of special measures and considered by the Care Quality Commission to be "caring, effective and well led".

== Finances ==
The hospital trust successfully applied for Foundation Status in 2010. The trust predicted a deficit of £14m in 2013–14.

== Trust Charitable Fund ==
Many patients and their families make donations to the hospital. These donations are treated separately to the main hospital income as they go to The Queen Elizabeth Hospital, King's Lynn, NHS Trust Charitable Fund. The registered charity number is 1051327.

== League of Friends ==
The League of Friends of the King's Lynn Area Hospitals was registered as a charity (Registered charity no 207408) in 1953. Since then, the band of volunteers, who staff the hospital shop and carry out other fundraising activities, have raised millions of pounds, which have been spent on essential equipment for the hospital.

== Fiction ==
Birthplace of Alan Partridge.

== See also ==
- List of NHS trusts
