= University Hospital Lewisham =

- Lewisham and Greenwich NHS Trust
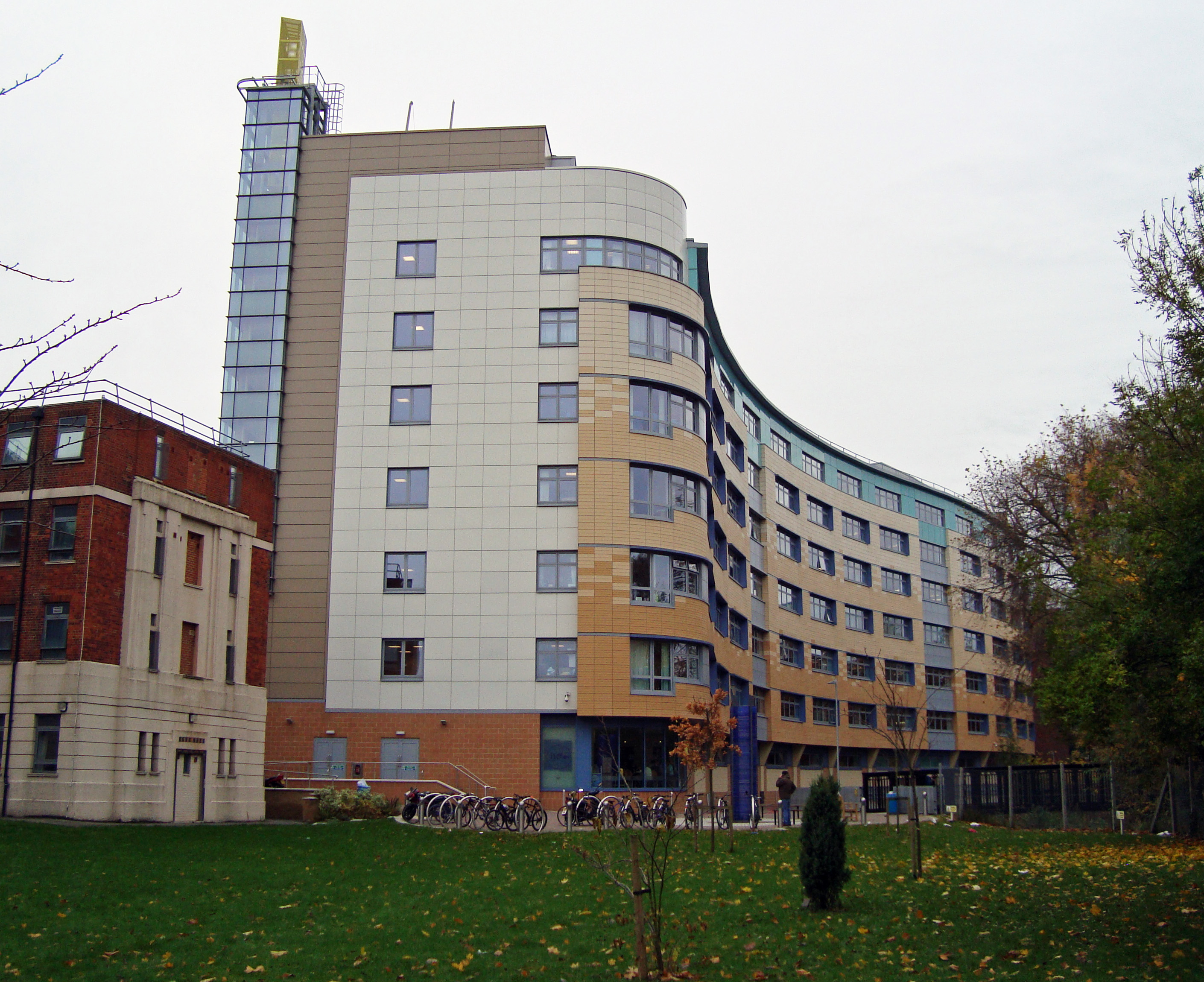
- The Riverside Building

- Location within Lewisham

Geography
- Location: Lewisham High Street, Lewisham, London SE13 6LH, England, United Kingdom
- Coordinates: 51.4533°N 0.0172°W

Organisation
- Care system: National Health Service
- Type: District General
- Affiliated university: King's College London

Services
- Emergency department: Yes Accident & Emergency
- Beds: 450

History
- Founded: 1894; 132 years ago

Links
- Website: lewishamandgreenwich.nhs.uk
- Lists: Hospitals in England

University Hospital Lewisham (formerly known as Lewisham Hospital) is a teaching hospital run by Lewisham and Greenwich NHS Trust and serving the London Borough of Lewisham. It is now affiliated with King's College London and forms part of the King's Health Partners academic health science centre. It is situated on Lewisham High Street between Lewisham and Catford.

== History ==
=== Early history ===
The site of the current hospital was originally a workhouse, following the bequest of a house on Rushey Green to Lewisham Parish for the relief of the poor in 1612. When the Lewisham workhouse became overcrowded, a new workhouse building was erected in 1817. The Lewisham Poor Law Union was formed in 1836, and the workhouse was enlarged. This improvement included the building of cholera wards behind the workhouse building.

A report in The Lancet in 1865 showed that the workhouse was essentially functioning as a hospital at that time: "Sick, infirm, and able-bodied – so called at least, but we saw none in the entire house – were placed in close approximation". At that time there were seven "sick wards", with 72 beds, and four "infection wards" with 22 beds. Land to the north of the workhouse was used to construct a separate infirmary from 1892, and this was formally opened in 1894.

During the First World War the infirmary became the Lewisham Military Hospital. Most workhouse inmates were relocated, but parts of the workhouse still functioned until 1929. Following the Local Government Act 1929, the hospital came within the administration of the London County Council (LCC). The LCC invested in substantial redevelopment with a new block opened by Lord Dawson of Penn in 1934. The new block consisted of three wings to house a maternity department with 63 beds, a children's section with 35 cots and two general wards with 66 beds. During the Second World War the hospital was hit by a V-1 flying bomb, which destroyed two wards, injured 70 people and killed one nurse.

Following the formation of the National Health Service in 1948, the hospital continued to expand with new buildings opened in the 1950s and 60s. These included the Outpatients Department in 1958, and an extension to the Accident Department in 1964. In 1954 a premature baby unit was opened, and in 1968 this was replaced by a Special Care Baby Unit. In 1968 the Intensive Therapy Unit was also opened – this was the first such unit in a district general hospital in England.

In 1991, the Sydenham Children's Hospital closed and moved to Lewisham Hospital. In November 1996 the Women's and Children's Wing was opened by Princess Alexandra. Lewisham Hospital NHS Trust was established in April 1993 when it formally separated from Guy's Hospital. In 1997 Hither Green Hospital closed, and the Elderly Care service was transferred to Lewisham Hospital.

=== Redevelopment ===
Further improvements culminated in the construction of the Riverside Building which was procured under a Private Finance Initiative contract in 2004. The works were designed by RTKL Associates and completed by Carillion at a cost of £58 million in December 2006. The building was officially opened by Archbishop Desmond Tutu in May 2007. It reflects current thinking about patient care, replacing Nightingale wards with multiple four-bedded bays. The design also reflects contemporary environmental concerns and was the first major NHS building to generate a proportion of its own power using photovoltaic panels installed on the roof.

In 2012, architects AWW worked with the hospital to re-plan five wards and medical facilities whilst maintaining the Emergency Department. The expanded facilities improve efficiency with the addition of a new Children's Emergency Department, Urgent Care Centre and new emergency x-ray facilities.

=== Proposed Accident and Emergency closure ===
In July 2012, South London Healthcare NHS Trust was put into financial administration. A government report in 2012 recommended that three SLHT hospitals should be taken over by nearby NHS trusts and that the University Hospital Lewisham Accident and Emergency unit should close, with A&E patients instead going to the SLHT-run Queen Elizabeth Hospital in Woolwich to make that hospital more viable.

There was a strong campaign in Lewisham against the proposed closure, including a march on 24 November 2012 and a successful legal challenge. In July 2013, the High Court ruled that the closure of Lewisham A&E could not go ahead. In October 2013, the Court of Appeal ruled that Health Secretary Jeremy Hunt did not have power to implement cuts at Lewisham Hospital. The director of the Save Lewisham Hospital campaign described this as "a complete victory".

== Facilities ==
The hospital offers a wide range of services including adult and children's Emergency departments and specialist services including neonatology, paediatric surgery, cystic fibrosis treatment, haemophilia treatment and Ear Nose and Throat (ENT) services. The hospital provides teaching and training for medical staff and gained university status in 1997. The Ladywell Unit on the premises is operated by the South London and Maudsley NHS Foundation Trust.

== Notable staff ==
Isabella Barbour Clunas OBE, was matron of Lewisham Hospital from 1929 to 1947. She was also a member of the Royal College of Nursing Council from 1934 to 1935.

Nurses' badges

== See also ==
- Healthcare in London
- List of hospitals in England
- King's Health Partners
