= Leeds and York Partnership NHS Foundation Trust =

Healthcare trust in England

- Type: Mental health trust
- Chair: Merran McRae
- Chief executive: Sara Munro
- Website: www.leedsandyorkpft.nhs.uk

Leeds and York Partnerships NHS Foundation Trust became an NHS Foundation Trust in August 2007. It merged with mental health and learning disability services from NHS North Yorkshire and York in February 2012 becoming Leeds and York Partnership NHS Foundation Trust.

It is the main provider of specialist mental health and learning disability services in Leeds. It also provides adult neurodiversity services in Leeds, some specialist services across West Yorkshire and Humber and North Yorkshire, and some highly specialised services across the North of England.

In 2019 the Care Quality Commission rated the Trust as good overall. In December 2025, Acute wards for adults of working age and psychiatric intensive care units, Long stay or rehabilitation mentla health wards for working age adults, and Wards for older people with mental health problems were rated as requires improvement. In September 2025, Child and adolescent mental health wards were rated as good and in August 2024, Perinatal services were rated as good.

== See also ==
- List of NHS trusts
