= Sheffield Health Partnership University NHS Foundation Trust =

NHS mental health trust

- Type: Mental health trust
- Chair: Sharon Mays
- Chief executive: Salma Yasmeen

Sheffield Health Partnership University NHS Foundation Trust is an NHS foundation trust which runs mental health and learning difficulty services in Sheffield, South Yorkshire, England. It runs the Central Health Clinic, Intensive Support Services, Jordanthorpe Health Centre, the Supported Living Service, Highgate Surgery, Darnall Community Health, Longley Meadows, Woodland View, Respite Service at 136 Warminster Road, Bolehill View, Hurlfield View, The Longley Centre, Michael Carlisle Centre, Warminster Road, Fulwood House, Forest Close, Forest Lodge, Grenoside Grange and Wainwright Crescent.

Prior to 25 September 2025, the trust was known as Sheffield Health and Social Care NHS Foundation Trust.

== Primary care ==
The trust made plans in June 2015 to set up a new company which could bid to run NHS services. The current board of directors would become shareholders. The new company would include the Clover Group of GP practices - Darnall Primary Care Centre, Highgate Surgery, Jordanthorpe Health Centre, and the Mulberry Practice. It could provide supported living services and respite care services. In April 2017 it had taken over the management of six GP practices with a GP list of 26,500.

== Performance ==
A Care Quality Commission inspection in 2015 found great variation in service delivery. The trust's forensic inpatient services were rated as "outstanding". Mental health crisis services, wards for older people with mental health problems and community mental health services for older people were rated "good" but, overall, the trust was rated as "requires improvement" because of concerns about staff shortages and medicines management.

It was named by the Health Service Journal as one of the top hundred NHS trusts to work for in 2015. At that time it had 2,392 full-time equivalent staff and a sickness absence rate of 5.97%. 67% of staff recommend it as a place for treatment and 65% recommended it as a place to work. In 2021 it came out lowest on all of the main quality and safety-related questions in the annual NHS Staff Survey, where it had shown deterioration over several years.

In 2016 the trust reported that it had removed the need for placing patients in beds out of the area. In 2011/12 there had been 2939 bed nights out of the area, but in 2015/6 only 188. The number of inpatient beds in use dropped over the same period from 141 to 84. £2 million saved had been used to employ more community nurses, and there were now always beds available in a crisis.

Between April 2017 and March 2018 the trust spent over £382,780 on out of city beds. In the same period it has spent £151,751 on agency nursing costs. The trust now has access to only 46 adult inpatient beds regardless of the increase in population of 10,000 in the past ten years.

The trust was warned by the Care Quality Commission in February 2020 that the leadership appeared to be unaware of various high-risk practices used by staff, including the use of mechanical restraint and allowing shared accommodation between young people and adults. Furthermore, mandatory training completion rates fell below the required standards.

== See also ==
- List of NHS trusts
- Sheffield Teaching Hospitals NHS Foundation Trust
- Mental health in the United Kingdom
- Healthcare in the United Kingdom
- Austerity
