= Lewisham and Greenwich NHS Trust =

NHS trust

- Type: NHS trust
- Established: 22 March 1993
- Hospitals: Queen Elizabeth Hospital; University Hospital Lewisham
- Staff: 8,347 (2023/24) WTE
- Website: www.lewishamandgreenwich.nhs.uk

Lewisham and Greenwich NHS Trust is an NHS trust which was formed on 1 October 2013 and is responsible for running two acute hospitals, Queen Elizabeth Hospital and University Hospital Lewisham, in addition to community health services in Lewisham.

The trust was formed by the acquisition of Queen Elizabeth Hospital by Lewisham Healthcare NHS Trust upon the dissolution of South London Healthcare NHS Trust. Despite extensive local opposition and legal challenges in Lewisham, the merger was approved by Secretary of State for Health Jeremy Hunt on 26 September 2013.

Both hospitals continue to operate emergency departments, acute medicine services and maternity units following the High Court decision which ruled that the plan to close services at Lewisham Hospital was unlawful, a judgement which was subsequently upheld in the Court of Appeal.

== History ==
The trust was established as the Lewisham Hospital NHS Trust on 22 March 1993, and became operational on 1 April 1993.

== Overseas patients ==
From 2015 the trust used Experian to identify overseas visitors who could be charged for NHS treatment. In 2018–19 it issued bills to ineligible patients for £4.1 million, slightly down on the previous year, but collected only £528,000. In September 2019 they suspended this policy and the contract was cancelled in January 2020. An independent review subsequently found some of its patients were left feeling "uncomfortable, scared or unable to seek timely treatment" by this approach, although the panel had received "independent assurances" their application of the current framework was "in line" with legislative guidance.

== Performance ==
The Trust was given an £8.5m bailout of public dividend capital by the Department of Health to cover an unexpected deficit for the financial year 2014–15.

The General Medical Council put the trust on an enhanced monitoring list in February 2017 after complaints from junior doctors about "clinical supervision, serious incident reporting, trust leadership, rotas and rota management, workload, educational supervision, pastoral support and access to educational opportunities".

It was inspected by the Care Quality Commission in 2014 and was rated inadequate. In 2016 it had improved and was rated 'requires improvement'. The maternity and gynaecology department was rated as good.

It planned for a year end deficit of £22.8 million for 2017-18 but by the end of July it was £12.4 million behind plan. In January 2018, it had to borrow £95 million on a turnover of £539 million. It had a plan, which was not achieved, equalling 8.6% of turnover, the closure of seven wards and a reduction in the average length of stay from 8.1 to 4.7 days. Its elective procedures are outsourced, orthopaedic surgery to BMI Healthcare and vascular surgery to Frontière Médicale.

== Choir ==
The Trust's choir, the Lewisham and Greenwich NHS Choir, appeared on Gareth Malone's BBC Two competition show The Choir: Sing While You Work in 2013, where they finished second. They reached Christmas singles chart number one in 2015 with their charity record "A Bridge over You", beating Justin Bieber's top-selling "Love Yourself" in the process. In 2020, they recorded a version of Bieber's "Holy", with the two former rivals combining to challenge for the Christmas number one spot. However, when the record was released on 18 December 2020 it still had a credit for Chance the Rapper, like the original version, which first entered the UK chart on 25 September 2020. As the new record was seen as just a remix, "Holy" ended up at Number 41 in the Christmas chart with 17,594 sales, after being classed as per the original release with no additional credit for the Lewisham and Greenwich NHS Choir.

They also were seen performing Joy to the World after the Queen's Speech on Christmas Day 2020.
