= Devon Partnership NHS Trust =

Mental health trust in Devon, England

- Former name: North and East Devon Partnership NHS Trust
- Type: Mental health trust
- Established: 1 April 2001
- Headquarters: Wonford House, Dryden Road, Exeter, EX2 5AF
- Region served: Devon
- Chair: Andy Willis
- Chief executive: Phill Mantay
- Staff: 4,484 (2023/24)
- Website: www.dpt.nhs.uk

Devon Partnership NHS Trust is a mental health trust established in 2001. It commissions and delivers mental health, learning disability, neurodiversity, gender and children's community services across Devon (excluding Plymouth), the wider South West and nationally.

== History ==
The North and East Devon Partnership NHS Trust was established in April 2001, before renaming to Devon Partnership NHS Trust in March 2002.

In December 2016, the Trust announced that it had applied for planning permission to build a brand new, £5.5 million psychiatric intensive-care unit (PICU) in Exeter. Work on site started in November 2017, and was completed in January 2019.

In March 2025, the Chadwell Centre in Paignton, which is owned by the Trust, was damaged by an arson attack.

== Services ==
Some of the services provided by Devon Partnership include:

- Mental health including older persons and veterans
- Children and Family Health Devon
- Drug and alcohol support
- Early intervention in psychosis
- Eating disorder support
- Learning disability support
- Police and Criminal Justice
- Perinatal support
- Rehabilitation and recovery.

In 2004 the trust established the "Mindful Employer" initiative, which aims to foster and promote positive attitudes to mental ill health across the UK and to support employers with the recruitment and retention of staff. The Mindful Employer initiative is administered by a team of mental health and employment professionals within the Trust. The initiative is now operated nationally, and promotes Mindful Employer Charter, a "Charter for Employers who are Positive about Mental Health". In 2014, then-Minister of State Norman Lamb referred to the initiative as "less well known" than Devon's English Riviera and Dartmoor, but nevertheless "hugely popular". At that time more than 1200 employers had signed up to the initiative, and he noted that the idea had been adopted in Australia, New Zealand and Canada.

== Performance ==
The trust was last inspected by the Care Quality Commission (CQC) in June 2021, with the report was published in September 2021. Its overall rating was 'Good'.

== See also ==
- List of NHS trusts
