= 2gether NHS Foundation Trust =

UK public sector healthcare provider in Gloucestershire, England

^{2}gether NHS Foundation Trust (^{2}gether) was an NHS Foundation Trust that provided mental and social health care services to the population of Gloucestershire and Herefordshire, England.

It ran services at Charlton Lane Centre and Honeybourne in Cheltenham, Wotton Lawn and Laurel House in Gloucester, Westridge Assessment and Treatment Service in Stonehouse, Gloucestershire, Hollybrook in Stroud, the Stonebow Unit and Oak House in Hereford.

It was formerly known as Gloucestershire Partnership NHS Trust and became a Foundation Trust in July 2007.

It was named by the Health Service Journal as one of the top hundred NHS trusts to work for in 2015. At that time it had 1,700 full-time equivalent staff and a sickness absence rate of 5.35%. 67% of staff recommended it as a place for treatment and 57% recommended it as a place to work. It was rated as 'good' by the Care Quality Commission at its first full inspection in 2015.

== Merger ==
In September 2017 the trust announced plans to merge with Gloucestershire Care Services NHS Trust. The trusts merged in October 2019, forming Gloucestershire Health and Care NHS Foundation Trust.

== See also ==
- List of NHS trusts
- Healthcare in Gloucestershire
