= NHS Online =

Digital NHS trust

The Online NHS Trust is an NHS trust which was established in 2026 to provide care for health conditions which can be safely diagnosed and managed by NHS clinicians virtually. These will include menopause and prostate problems, urinary tract infections, iron deficiency anaemia, inflammatory bowel disease and some eye conditions.

It is planned to provide up to 8.5 million virtual appointments and assessments in its first three years using the NHS App and video consultations.

Dame Caroline Clarke was appointed chief executive. She was previously group chief executive of the Royal Free London NHS Foundation Trust. John Browett is the chair of the trust. He is also chair of the Institute of Directors. Browett was formerly the CEO of Tesco.com.
