= Gloucestershire Care Services NHS Trust =

Gloucestershire Care Services NHS Trust was a community health trust established in 2012 under the Transforming Community Services programme to run community services in Gloucestershire after proposals to set up a community interest company, Gloucester Care Services, were abandoned. The trust was superseded by Gloucestershire Health and Care NHS Foundation Trust in 2019.

The organisation provided a range of in-patient and out-patient services to a population of about 600,000, including nursing, physiotherapy, re-ablement and adult social care services. It adopted Medworxx Patient Flow Solution to optimise patient flow and discharge.

Katie Norton, who was working for Deloitte but had been chief executive at Neath Port Talbot Health Board and North Somerset Primary Care Trust, was appointed Chief Executive in 2016.

Contraceptive services were provided at St Paul's Wing of Cheltenham General Hospital, while genito-urinary medicine was delivered at Benhall Clinic. In 2015, the trust set up an integrated service in a new purpose-built clinic.

Anne Frances MacCallum, the trust's head of specialist services, was awarded the British Empire Medal for services to nursing in the Queen's Birthday Honours 2015.

In September 2017 the trust announced plans to merge with ^{2}gether NHS Foundation Trust, which also covers Herefordshire. The merger was completed in October 2019 to form Gloucestershire Health and Care NHS Foundation Trust.

== See also ==
- Healthcare in Gloucestershire
- List of NHS trusts
