= South London Healthcare NHS Trust =

English national health service trust (2009–2013)

South London Healthcare NHS Trust was an English National Health Service trust which ran three hospitals in south east London. It was dissolved on 1 October 2013 after going into administration.

South London Healthcare NHS Trust was formed in 2009 by amalgamating three small trusts (Queen Mary's Sidcup NHS Trust, Queen Elizabeth Hospital NHS Trust and Bromley Hospitals NHS Trust), each of which was losing money. Subsequently it ran up debts of more than £250m and was the first NHS Trust to be put into administration, in July 2012.

The decision by the Trust Special Administrator to propose changes to Lewisham Hospital as part of the winding up process was controversial and was successfully challenged in court by the London Borough of Lewisham and the Save Lewisham Hospital Campaign.

Its constituent hospitals have been transferred to other NHS organisations:

- Princess Royal University Hospital (Bromley), Beckenham Beacon and Orpington Hospital have been transferred to King's College Hospital NHS Foundation Trust.
- Queen Elizabeth Hospital, London has been transferred to Lewisham and Greenwich NHS Trust, a new organisation.
- Queen Mary's Hospital, Sidcup has been transferred to Oxleas NHS Foundation Trust.

== See also ==
- List of NHS trusts
