= Community health trust =

As part of the English NHS programme of separating the provision of services from commissioning known as Transforming Community Services a number of community health trusts were established when these services were separated from primary care trusts.

This was one of a number of options taken. In some places community services were transferred to an existing mental health trust or hospital trust. In South West England there was considerable pressure for staff to establish social enterprises such as Peninsula Community Health to take on these services.

Campaigners in Gloucestershire successfully challenged the decision to establish a social enterprise to provide community health services there in 2012.

Contracts to run NHS community services are subject to competitive tendering processes under the Health and Social Care Act 2012, so it is not clear whether these organisations will survive. The NHS community health services sector, not including mental health services, is said to be worth £9.7 billion - about 10% of the entire NHS budget. This is the sector in which competition from private providers such as Virgin Healthcare and Serco is most intense. There is a great deal of pressure to move NHS services out of hospitals and into the community, but up to now most of these services have been funded by block contracts. There are measures of activity but no outcome measures and no NHS tariff, so there is no financial incentive for providers to ensure services are effective. As of 2016 it remains to be seen what impact the instigation of Any Qualified Provider contracts will have on this sector.

Community services have been repeatedly reorganised since the abolition of district health authorities in 1996. Established as NHS trusts, they were under the same imperative to become NHS foundation trusts as existing trusts, but it seems unlikely that many of them will be able to pass the tests in their present form.

Community healthcare trusts may provide services including:

- District nursing, including out of hours nursing
- Health visiting
- School nursing
- Community physiotherapy
- Speech and language therapy
- Community podiatry

== Free-standing community health trusts existing in 2013 ==
- Birmingham Community Healthcare NHS Trust
- Bridgewater Community Healthcare (based in Wigan)
- Cambridgeshire Community Services NHS Trust
- Central London Community Healthcare NHS Trust (also provides services in Hertfordshire)
- Croydon Community Health Services
- Derbyshire Community Health Services NHS Trust
- Gloucestershire Care Services NHS Trust
- Hertfordshire Community NHS Trust
- Hounslow and Richmond Community Healthcare NHS Trust
- Kent Community Health NHS Foundation Trust
- Leeds Community Healthcare NHS Trust
- Lincolnshire Community Health Services
- Liverpool Community Health NHS Trust
- Medway Community Healthcare
- Norfolk Community Health and Care NHS Trust
- Shropshire Community Health NHS Trust
- Sussex Community NHS Trust
- Tameside and Glossop Community Healthcare
- Wirral Community NHS Trust
