= Lincolnshire Partnership NHS Foundation Trust =

- Type: NHS Foundation Trust
- Established: June 2002
- Headquarters: The Point, Lions Way, Sleaford, England
- Region served: Lincolnshire
- Chief executive: John Turner
- Website: www.lpft.nhs.uk

Lincolnshire Partnership NHS Foundation Trust is an NHS Foundation Trust serving Lincolnshire, England. It was established in June 2002 when social care and health services, formerly provided by Lincolnshire County Council and Lincolnshire Healthcare NHS Trust, were brought together. It was authorised as a foundation trust on 1 October 2007.

The trust established Universal Health Ltd a joint venture with Lincolnshire and District Medical Services in 2015. It took over the running of the Burton Road Surgery in Lincoln in June 2015.

It runs Long Leys Court and the Peter Hodgkinson Centre in Lincoln. Long Leys Court cares for 16 people with a learning disability, who often have complex needs. It was closed temporarily in 2015 while police investigated three serious incidents.

It was named by the Health Service Journal as one of the top hundred NHS trusts to work for in 2015. At that time it had 1886 full-time equivalent staff and a sickness absence rate of 4.6%. 62% of staff recommend it as a place for treatment and 56% recommended it as a place to work.

The trust deployed a new Servelec RiO electronic patient record system in September 2018 with 202,080 patient records.

== See also ==
- List of NHS trusts
