= Derbyshire Healthcare NHS Foundation Trust =

Organization

- Former name: Derbyshire Mental Health Services NHS Trust
- Type: NHS foundation trust
- Established: 1 February 2011
- Region served: Derbyshire
- Chair: Selina Ullah
- Chief executive: Mark Powell
- Staff: 3,010
- Website: www.derbyshirehealthcareft.nhs.uk

Derbyshire Healthcare NHS Foundation Trust is a specialist NHS provider of health services including mental health services, neurodevelopmental services, children's health services, drug and alcohol recovery services and gambling support services. It is currently rated 'good' by health regulator the Care Quality Commission.

== History ==
The Southern Derbyshire Mental Health NHS Trust was established in 1992, before renaming as Southern Derbyshire Community and Mental Health Services NHS Trust in 2001. The Trust became Derbyshire Mental Health Services National Health Service Trust in 2002, providing some services previously provided by Community Health Care (North Derbyshire) NHS Trust which was dissolved. When the Trust became an NHS foundation trust in February 2011 it renamed to Derbyshire Healthcare.

In April 2011, following a tender process, the trust became the provider of Children's Universal and Specialist Services for Derby. In addition, as part of the Transforming Community Services programme, Community Paediatric Services and Substance Misuse Services from NHS Derby City were transferred into the organisation.

In 2013, the trust began a large-scale transformation programme which has resulted in the establishment of a neighbourhood-based approach to its adult community mental health services. Services are now provided on a needs-led basis, regardless of the service receiver's age. The staff within the eight neighbourhood teams work closely with each other and other local health professionals, and draw on local community resources to help people rebuild their lives after an episode of mental ill health.

In 2015, working in partnership with charitable organisations Aquarius and Phoenix Futures, the trust secured the contract to provide an integrated drug and alcohol recovery service within Derby city from 1 April 2015. Following a competitive tender process, the three partners were awarded the three-year contract by Derby City Council to deliver an integrated drug and alcohol treatment system, including both community and complex support.

In 2015, the trust again secured the contract to provide children's services for Derby, starting in 2016. Earlier in the year, the trust's health visiting service secured level 3 of Unicef's Baby Friendly Initiative for Derby.

In 2015, an employment tribunal ruled that, in 2013, the then chairman of the trust colluded with the chief executive to dismiss the director of human resources after she rejected the chairman's advances. The director of HR was awarded compensation of £832,711 in February 2016.

It announced plans to explore a merger with Derbyshire Community Health Services NHS Foundation Trust in November 2016. In June 2017 it was decided that the two trusts would not merge, but would continue to work closely together.

In 2022 the trust announced that it had secured funding to develop new healthcare facilities so that inpatients have single-room, en-suiite accommodation. The building programme is called the Making Room for Dignity and the first of the new facilities opened in 2024.

== Services ==
The trust is the largest provider of mental health, learning disabilities, and substance misuse services in Derbyshire, primarily serving the people of Derbyshire and Derby city which has a combined population of approximately 1 million, with 71 languages spoken. The trust runs a Centre for Research and Development which focuses on specific clinical areas including compassion-focused care, dementia and delirium, and the prevention of suicide and self-harm.

The Trust has over 3,000 staff who cover a range of services over 66 sites throughout Derby city and Derbyshire. These include community settings, inpatient (hospital) units and specialist locations such as courts and prisons.

== Sites ==
The trust's inpatient units are as follows:

• The Radbourne Unit in Derby, which provides four acute mental health inpatient wards (including a recovery-focused centre called the Hope and Resilience Hub), an enhanced care ward, mental health and substance misuse liaison services for the Accident & Emergency department at Royal Derby Hospital, mental health crisis services, occupational therapy services and an ECT (Electro-Convulsive Therapy) suite.

• The Hartington Unit in Chesterfield, which provides three acute mental health inpatient wards, an outpatient unit, mental health crisis home treatment teams, and mental health and substance misuse liaison services for the Accident & Emergency department at Chesterfield Royal Hospital.

• Older people's mental health services - including at Tissington House at Kingsway Hospital in Derby (this service was formerly based at London Road Community Hospital in Derby), a specialist dementia ward on the Kingsway site in Derby and a Dementia Rapid Response Team to support people with dementia to remain in their community for as long as possible, as well as physiotherapy services.

• Forensic and rehabilitation services, including gender specific low-secure services on the Kingsway site in Derby, prison in-reach and criminal justice liaison teams.

== See also ==
- List of NHS trusts
