= Leeds Community Healthcare NHS Trust =

Healthcare trust in England

- Type: NHS community trust
- Chief executive: Selina Douglas
- Website: www.leedscommunityhealthcare.nhs.uk

Leeds Community Healthcare NHS Trust was established in 2011. It runs a wide range of services in and around Leeds.

It runs the Leeds Eating and Drinking Team which aims to tackle the growing problem of malnutrition.

In April 2015 the trust was criticised by the Care Quality Commission which raised concerns about insufficient staffing levels and a "high reliance" on temporary staff, particularly at the South Leeds Independence Centre.

Wendy Neill, one of the trust's speech and language therapists, set up the Giving Voice choir in 2014. It helps people with conditions like strokes, multiple sclerosis, Parkinson's and dementia to socialise and stretch their vocal cords.

Haris Sultan (Youth Board Member) and Chris Lake (Youth Board Facilitator) set up the Youth Board for Leeds Community Healthcare Trust in July 2018, it now has over 40 members

It runs the Assisted Living Leeds centre in a partnership with Leeds City Council. This houses the Community Equipment Service, providing equipment for daily living and nursing needs at home, and also the council's Telecare service, which enables vulnerable residents to stay safe by fitting sensors and alarms around the house.

The Trust's service for homeless patients in Leeds, York Street Health practice, was said to be outstanding by the Care Quality Commission in 2016, and described by Richard Vautrey as a national exemplar. Steve Field said it was a 'thoroughly outstanding practice', which was 'one of the best the CQC has visited'. The contract was transferred to Bevan Healthcare CIC in 2017.

It formed an alliance in September 2017 with three local GP Federations, Local Care Direct, which provides the out-of-hours service, and One Medical Group, which provides walk-in services, to provide a primary care streaming service for A&E departments across Leeds. This is intended to form the basis of a primary care home model.

== See also ==
- List of NHS trusts
