= Gloucestershire Health and Care NHS Foundation Trust =

- Type: NHS foundation trust
- Established: 1 October 2019
- Chair: Graham Russell
- Chief executive: Douglas Blair
- Website: ghc.nhs.uk

Gloucestershire Health and Care NHS Foundation Trust is an NHS foundation trust which provides physical health, mental health and learning disability services throughout Gloucestershire.

The trust was formed on 1 October 2019 by the merger of ^{2}gether NHS Foundation Trust and Gloucestershire Care Services NHS Trust.
