= NHS trust =

Self-governing administrative body within the National Health Service

An NHS trust is an organisational unit within the National Health Services of England and Wales, generally serving either a geographical area or a specialised function (such as an ambulance service). In any particular location there may be several trusts involved in the different aspects of providing healthcare to the local population. As of April 2020, there were altogether 217 trusts, and they employ around 800,000 of the NHS's 1.2 million staff.

== History ==
NHS trusts were established under the National Health Service and Community Care Act 1990 and were set up in five waves. Each one was established by a statutory instrument.

NHS trusts are not trusts in the legal sense but are in effect public sector corporations. Each trust is headed by a board consisting of executive and non-executive directors, and is chaired by a non-executive director. There were about 2,200 non-executives across 470 organisations in the NHS in England in 2015. Non-executive directors are recruited by open advertisement. All trusts (foundation trusts and those which have yet to reach foundation trust status) are regulated by NHS England and the Care Quality Commission. Board members are, from November 2014, subject to a fit and proper person test.

All trust boards are required to have an audit committee consisting only of non-executive directors, on which the chair may not sit. This committee is entrusted not only with the supervision of financial audit, but of systems of corporate governance within the trust. Hospital board members have a duty to act on signals of poor performance on quality and safety data, and yet many of the papers presented to them have been found to be lacking good data visualisations.

The High Court of Justice decided in December 2019 that NHS trusts were not charities for the purposes of the Local Government Finance Act 1988, so they have to pay business rates at the full rate.

A study by the University of Exeter in 2020 found that in 70 out of the 213 trusts all the board members were white. Overall BAME representation at board level was 8.9%. Medical directors of BAME ethnicity accounted for 19.4%, about the same as the overall percentage of BAME doctors.

== Future development ==
In September 2015 Jeremy Hunt was reported as saying "I think we do have too many trusts as independent organisations" in a context where mergers between trusts and the establishment of chains of hospitals were being discussed. Subsequently Simon Stevens made it clear that he did not expect the remaining NHS trusts to become foundation trusts, saying "We are frankly kidding ourselves if we think the non-FTs are going to pass the kinds of criteria that have been set by Monitor."

== Types ==
There are several types of NHS trusts:

- Hospital trust (also known as an acute trust), which provides secondary care services
- Mental health trust
- Ambulance services trust
- Community health trust

Over time the distinction between different types has eroded, and both hospital and mental health trusts have taken on responsibility for various community services. Sustainability and transformation plans all propose to move services out of hospitals into the community and the hospital trusts are generally planning to follow these initiatives.

=== Foundation trusts ===
Foundation trust status may be applied for by the above categories of NHS trust. Successive governments have announced that all NHS trusts should become foundation trusts, and deadlines have been set for this transformation, which have repeatedly been missed.

=== Former types ===
- Primary care trust (PCT) (abolished 1 April 2013), which provided primary care services, public health functions and commissioned secondary care services
- Care trust (abolished 1 April 2013), provided/commissioned health and social care services, usually with responsibilities of both a PCT and a local authority

== Other types of NHS organisation ==
Several special health authorities, organised on a national basis, deal with NHS-wide issues. An example is NHS Blood and Transplant.

== See also ==
- List of NHS trusts in England
- List of NHS Wales trusts and health boards
