= NHS foundation trust =

Semi-autonomous organisational unit within the National Health Service in England

NHS foundation trusts are semi-autonomous organisational units within the National Health Service (NHS) in England. They operate with a degree of independence from the Department of Health and Social Care, and—prior to the abolition of strategic health authorities (SHAs) in 2013—from their respective SHA. Foundation trusts were established to decentralise decision-making and improve responsiveness to local needs. As of March 2019, there were 151 foundation trusts in operation.

== Inspiration ==
Alan Milburn's trip in 2001 to the Hospital Universitario Fundación Alcorcón in Spain is thought to have been influential in developing ideas around foundation status. That hospital was built by the Spanish National Health System, but its operational management is contracted out to a private company, and exempt from many of the rules normally imposed on state-owned hospitals, and in particular, that hospital was allowed to negotiate its own contracts with workers. The governance of that hospital includes local government, trade unions, health workers and community groups.

== History ==
Foundation trusts were announced by Health Secretary Alan Milburn in 2002, and the legislative basis was the Health and Social Care (Community Health and Standards) Act 2003. The first ten NHS hospitals to become foundation trusts were announced in 2004. Gordon Brown prevented plans by Alan Milburn that they should be financially autonomous in 2002. By 2012, the Monitor website listed 145 foundation trusts.

Successive governments set target dates by which all NHS trusts were supposed to have reached foundation status. For example, by 2009 the Department of Health was promoting "A new type of NHS hospital". In 2011, the 116 trusts then in the pipeline to make applications were required to sign a formal agreement, with a deadline for the application to be made. Board members at a number of trusts which missed the deadline were sacked.

It was accepted by Andrew Lansley that a number of trusts would never reach foundation trust status, and a new organisation – the NHS Trust Development Authority – was established by the Health and Social Care Act 2012 to supervise trusts which have not reached foundation status, of which there were 99 in April 2013, 47 of which were never expected to reach foundation status.

The Health and Social Care Bill 2011, overseen by Lansley, proposed that all NHS trusts become foundation trusts or part of an existing foundation trust by April 2014.

The early foundation trusts were generally financially buoyant, but during 2013 and 2014 more faced financial difficulties. A foundation trust finance facility, managed by an advisory committee to the Department of Health, was established to process loans for capital developments, but during 2014 applications were made by trusts which had trouble paying utility bills or replacing medical equipment. Guidance issued under the tenure of Jeremy Hunt in October 2014 said that conditions could be set which could include: reductions in the use of temporary staff, "use of collaborative procurement routes" or "the adoption of a shared services solution". By the end of 2013–14, foundation trusts collectively had built up cash reserves of £4.3 billion and it was suggested in the NHS Five Year Forward View that the government would "support" foundation trusts to spend this money "to help local service transformation". In response, the chief executive of the Foundation Trust Network, Chris Hopson, said: "The responsibility for these surpluses lies with the FTs; any attempt by the statutory bodies to make a grab for them will be furiously resisted".

By 2016, the distinction between foundation trusts and other NHS trusts was widely regarded as eroded, and in that year the two regulators were combined into a new body, NHS Improvement. The notion that every trust should become a foundation trust was abandoned, and the widespread financial crisis undermined the supposed autonomy when almost all had to rely on money borrowed from the Department of Health, to which strings were attached.

== Function ==
Foundation trusts have some managerial and financial freedom when compared to NHS trusts. The introduction of foundation trusts represented a change in the history of the National Health Service and the way in which hospital services are managed and provided. At the time of introduction, they were described "as a sort of halfway house between the public and private sectors". This form of NHS trust is an important part of the United Kingdom government's programme to create a "patient-led" NHS with an internal market. The stated purpose is to devolve decision-making from a centralised NHS to local communities, in an effort to be more responsive to their needs and wishes. But after Gordon Brown prevented plans by Alan Milburn to make them financially autonomous they have been much more in the public sector and less autonomous than was originally expected.

== Statistics ==
By March 2013 there were 145 foundation trusts, of which 41 were mental health trusts and three were ambulance trusts. They included acute trusts, mental health, community and ambulance trusts. By March 2019, the number of foundation trusts had shown a small increase to 151.

== Governance ==
The basic governance structure and form of foundation trusts is described in Schedule 7 of the National Health Service Act 2006, with the formal corporate form being called a "public benefit corporation".

Each foundation trust has a council of governors. This is made up of elected governors and appointed governors. Elected governors are chosen by a secret postal ballot of the membership, which is open to the general public. The elections are usually held in separate constituencies. Typically there is a staff constituency, a patient constituency, and a "public member" constituency, consisting of members who are neither patients nor staff but live in a defined geographical area. In addition, there are governors appointed by bodies with whom the trust works in partnership. So, for example, appointments may be made by local councils, local medical schools, and local voluntary organisations. Governors are intended to act as a link between the community and the board of directors. The size of the council of governors and its exact composition are determined by the constitution of the particular trust. Each trust adopts its own constitution subject to certain restrictions in legislation. These restrictions include that a majority of the council of governors must be elected governors and governors must be unpaid volunteers. Some trusts are more committed to co-operative principles and have even written the Rochdale Principles into their constitution; they aspire to work closely and in partnership with other mutual and local organisations.

At first, foundation trusts were authorised and regulated by Monitor, a non-executive body under the Department of Health. Monitor was merged into NHS Improvement in 2016.

The trade body for foundation trusts is NHS Providers, formerly known as the Foundation Trust Network, which has 95% of all acute, ambulance, community and mental health foundation trusts in its membership.

A 2014 report by the Socialist Health Association said that on the whole after 10 years, "Foundation Trusts [had]... not deepened in terms of democratic practice and participation".

The independence of Foundation Trust governors was challenged in 2021 when the governors of Queen Victoria Hospital, a small specialist trust, called for a pause to plans for it to merge with University Hospitals Sussex NHS Foundation Trust. NHS Improvement were said to have effectively ordered the council of governors to work towards a merger.

== Reception ==
A study undertaken in 2005 by the King's Fund of Homerton University Hospital NHS Foundation Trust found some governors disappointed and disillusioned.

Another report in 2005, funded by the Nuffield Foundation, found that it was too easy to invite members to sit on sub-committees, where they quickly became bogged down in the minutiae of operational planning, whilst the main decisions were taken at meetings that they only heard about after they took place.

The public's perception of foundation trust status implying a high standard of clinical care was changed by the Mid Staffordshire NHS Foundation Trust scandal of the late 2000s (Stafford Hospital Scandal) and the ensuing Francis inquiry, published in 2013. At the outset, some critics claimed that foundation trusts went against the spirit of the principles laid out by Aneurin Bevan, the founder of the NHS. Others feared that it would lead to a two-tier system. Others doubted whether foundation trust members would succeed in having any effective influence over hospital management.

In 2011, some argued in a report financed by the Nuffield Foundation that the success associated with foundation trusts had been due to other factors than governance.

In June 2014, Bill Moyes, former Monitor executive chair, urged the NHS to reconsider "whether the model of foundation trusts is sensible", arguing "If one-third of the hospital system is permanently not demonstrating good viability and good governance, is that telling you something about actually how the system should run as opposed to how we thought it should run?".

In January 2022 Sajid Javid, writing in The Times said he was planning a “revolution” that would allow “well-run hospitals more freedom”.

== Comparison with other NHS trusts ==
Foundation trusts had a cap on the proportion of their income that can come from non-NHS treatments. It did not only apply to income derived from individual patients, it covered income from all non-NHS sources. This could include joint ventures to develop medical technologies, employers paying for counselling services or income from treating UK military personnel overseas.

The Health and Social Care Act 2012 abolished the private patient income cap but FTs have to do the majority of their work for the NHS. This restriction was kept to reassure those concerned about future developments that FTs would continue to have NHS work as their central concern. Previously each FT had its own cap, set at the level of its private activity when the first FTs were established in 2003/4. About three-quarters of all FTs had a cap of 1.5% or less. Until 2010 all mental health trusts were completely barred from undertaking non-NHS work, but after lobbying from the Foundation Trust Network it was raised to 1.5%. These caps disappeared on 1 October 2012. Collective earnings from private patients increased 14%, from £346.1 million in 2012–13 to £395.9 million for 2014–15. Private earning is concentrated on specialist hospitals in London who see many patients from other countries. Most trusts have negligible private income.

== Achieving foundation trust status ==
In order to achieve foundation trust status, NHS trusts have to pass a variety of tests, which have changed over time. In 2003 only trusts with three stars from the Commission for Health Improvement were eligible for foundation status. In that year Aintree Hospitals, Essex Rivers Healthcare, Newcastle upon Tyne Hospitals and Walsall Hospitals were all downgraded to two stars and so did not make the first wave of foundation trusts.

== Highly secure psychiatric services (EFT) ==
Formerly referred to as foundation trust equivalent (FTe) instead of Equivalent Foundation Trusts, this designation applies only to trusts providing high secure psychiatric services, of which there are three: Nottinghamshire Healthcare NHS Trust, West London Mental Health NHS Trust and Mersey Care NHS Trust.

These trusts abide by the Department of Health definition of a foundation trust, but the Secretary of State for Health maintains a direct line of communication and accountability with them because he or she has the responsibility to provide healthcare to patients who have been detained under the Mental Health Act, and have been judged to pose a grave and immediate danger to the public.

Unlike full foundation trusts, governors have no statutory role, and the board of directors have no statutory duty towards the governors. The governors cannot, without the board of directors' permission, have any control over the direction of the trust, and cannot appoint or remove trust auditors. The chair and directors are not appointed by their board of governors.

== See also ==
- History of the National Health Service
- List of NHS trusts in England
- Category:NHS foundation trusts
