= Racism in the United Kingdom =

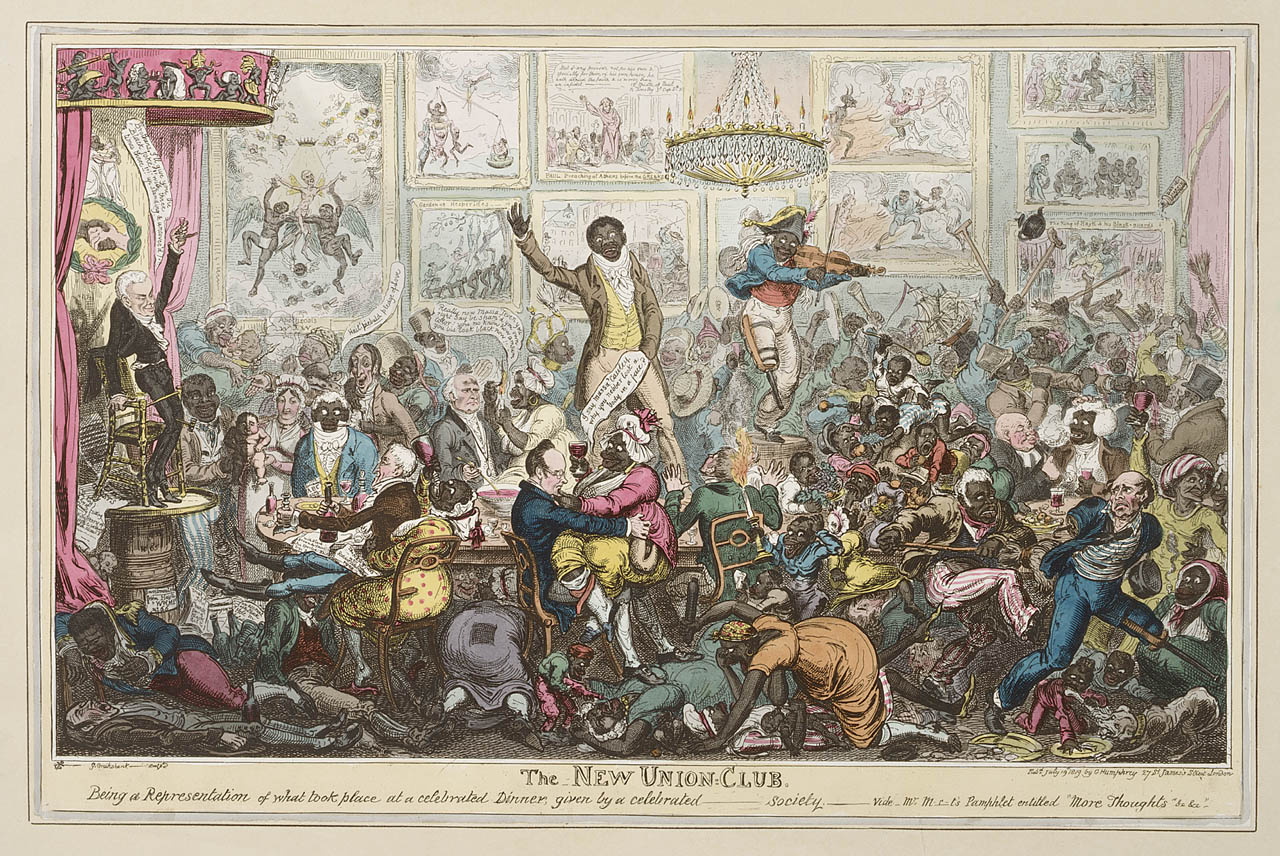
George Cruikshank's caricature of a dinner party in 1819 held by abolitionists depicting black people as drunken, aggressive and sexually promiscuous

Racism in the United Kingdom has existed since the very creation of the united Kingdom of Great Britain in 1707. It has included structural discrimination and hostile attitudes against various ethnic minorities. The extent and the targets have varied over time. It has resulted in cases of discrimination, riots, racially motivated murders and de facto segregation.

Among the populations targeted historically and today have been Jews, who have experienced antisemitism for centuries; Irish people and other subsequent subjects of British colonialism, black people, Romani people, migrants, and refugees. Some studies suggest Brexit led to a rise in racist incidents and hostility to foreigners or immigrants, adversely affecting Poles, Romanians and other European groups.

Levels of racist attitudes have increased in recent decades, and structural disadvantages persist and hate incidents continue.

== History ==
At the time of the initial formation of the United Kingdom in 1707, thousands of families in the country owned slaves. By the mid-18th century, London had the largest Black population in Britain, made up of free and enslaved people, as well as many runaways. The total number may have been about 10,000. Some of these people were forced into beggary due to the lack of jobs and racial discrimination. Owners of African slaves in England would advertise slave-sales and for re-capture runaways.

=== After abolition ===
Racism against black people grew after 1860, when race-based discrimination was fed by then-popular theories of scientific racism. Attempts to support these theories cited 'scientific evidence', such as brain size. James Hunt, President of the London Anthropological Society, wrote in 1863 in his paper, On the Negro's Place in Nature, "the Negro is inferior intellectually to the European...[and] can only be humanised and civilised by Europeans."

Following disarmament in 1919, a surplus of labour and shortage of housing led to dissatisfaction among Britain's working class, in particular sailors and dock workers. In ports, such as South Shields, Glasgow, London's East End, Liverpool, Cardiff, Barry and Newport there were fierce race riots targeting ethnic minority populations. During violence in 1919, there were five fatalities as well as widespread vandalism of property. One hundred and twenty black workers were sacked in Liverpool after whites refused to work with them. A modern study of the 1919 riots by Jacqueline Jenkinson showed that police arrested nearly twice as many blacks (155) as whites (89). While most of the whites were convicted, however, nearly half of Black arrestees were acquitted. Jenkinson suggests that the courts acknowledged their innocence and were attempting to correct for police bias.

Racial segregation existed throughout much of the country in the early twentieth century. The landmark case Constantine v Imperial Hotels Ltd (1944) established an important step in the development of modern anti-discrimination law and according to Peter Mason, it "was one of the key milestones along the road to the creation of the Race Relations Act of 1965." Popular Trinidadian cricketer Learie Constantine was awarded damages at the High Court after being turned away from the Imperial Hotel in Russell Square, London in 1943. The proprietor believed his presence would offend white American servicemen staying at the hotel, as the United States Armed Forces were still racially segregated. Public and political opinion was in Constantine's favour over the case. In Parliament, then Under-Secretary of State for Dominion Affairs Paul Emrys-Evans said the government: "most strongly condemns any form of racial discrimination against Colonial people in this country."

Although racial discrimination continued in England, this case was the first to challenge such practices in court. Commentators regard it as a milestone in British racial equality, demonstrating that black people had legal recourse against some forms of racism.

There were further riots targeting immigrant and minority populations in East London and Notting Hill in the 1950s, leading to the establishment of the Notting Hill Carnival.

=== 1970s and 1980s ===
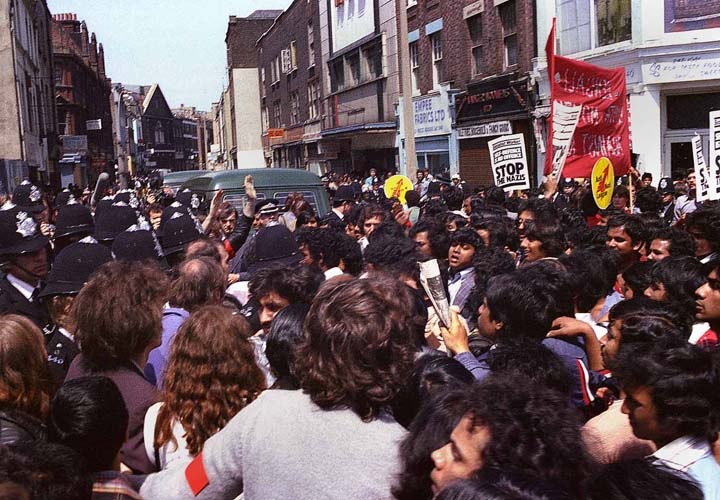
Demonstration in June 1978, after the killing by racists of Altab Ali, a young Bangladeshi man, in May 1978, against the National Front and other racists who were active in the Brick Lane area

In the 1970s and 1980s, black people and south Asian people in Britain were the victims of racist violence perpetrated by far-right groups such as the National Front. During this period, it was also common for black footballers to be subjected to racist chanting from crowd members.

In the early 1980s, societal racism, discrimination and poverty—alongside further perceptions of powerlessness and oppressive policing—sparked a series of riots in areas with substantial African-Caribbean populations. These riots took place in St Pauls in 1980, Brixton, Toxteth and Moss Side in 1981, St Pauls again in 1982, Notting Hill Gate in 1982, Toxteth in 1982, and Handsworth, Brixton and Tottenham in 1985.

=== 21st century ===
Racism in Britain in general, including against black and south Asian people, is considered to have declined over time. In 2019, the prevalence of perceived racist harassment toward people of African descent in the UK was found to be the second lowest among the 12 Western European countries surveyed, and formal discrimination against Afro-Caribbeans no longer exists. Social distance, measured using questions from the British Social Attitudes survey, declined over the period 1983–1996 with much of this change happening in the 1990s.

Nevertheless, research continues to show widespread social and economic disadvantages for racial minorities. Studies published in 2014 and 2015 suggested racist attitudes were on the rise in the UK, and in 2023, 88% of Black people in Britain reported racial discrimination at work, 79% believed the police unfairly targeted black people with stop and search powers, and 80% definitely or somewhat agreed that racial discrimination was the biggest barrier to academic attainment for young Black students. Earlier studies showed the British school system undermined self-confidence in black children, and maligned the culture of their parents, while just 0.1% of active professors in the UK were black women, compared with 68% being white men. Black women professors had also faced discriminatory abuse and exclusion throughout their careers.

In the year ending March 2024, recorded hate crimes in the UK fell by 5%, with police in England and Wales recording 140,561 hate crimes, 70% of which were racially motivated. There was also a 147% increase in antisemitic offences in that year. In England and Wales, 3,282 alleged antisemitic offences were recorded in the year ending March 2024, more than double that of the previous year, while allegedly anti-Muslim offences rose by 13%.

In 2020, The Commission on Race and Ethnic Disparities (CRED) was established in the wake of Black Lives Matter protests following the murder of George Floyd in the United States. The then Conservative government's brief for the commission was to look at questions of race relations and disparity, and to examine why such disparities persisted. The commission published its report in March 2021, the content of which caused considerable controversy. The report concluded that the "claim the country is still institutionally racist is not borne out by the evidence", but some experts complained that the report misrepresented evidence, and that recommendations from ethnic minority business leaders who contributed were ignored. Seun Matiluko has written that CRED "would become one of the most controversial government commissions of the 21st century". Additionally, a section on the Caribbean slave trade was amended, following widespread criticism that it glorified the practice and downplayed its negative effects.

== By ethnicity and religion ==
=== Black people ===
Black immigrants who arrived in Britain from the Caribbean in the 1950s faced racism. For many Caribbean immigrants, their first experience of discrimination came when trying to find private accommodation. They were generally ineligible for council housing because only people who had been resident in the UK for a minimum of five years qualified for it. At the time, there was no anti-discrimination legislation to prevent landlords from refusing to accept black tenants. A survey undertaken in Birmingham in 1956 found that only 15 of a total of 1,000 white people surveyed would let a room to a black tenant. As a result, many black immigrants were forced to live in slum areas of cities, where the housing was of poor quality and there were problems of crime, violence and prostitution. One of the most notorious slum landlords was Peter Rachman, who owned around 100 properties in the Notting Hill area of London. Black tenants sometimes paid twice the rent of white tenants, and lived in conditions of extreme overcrowding.

Historian Winston James suggests that the experience of racism in Britain was a major factor in the development of a shared Caribbean identity amongst black immigrants from a range of different island and class backgrounds.

In the 1970s and 1980s, black people in Britain were the victims of racist violence perpetrated by far-right groups such as the National Front. During this period, it was also common for Black footballers to be subjected to racist chanting from crowd members.

Racism in Britain in general, including against black people, is considered to have declined over time. Academic Robert Ford demonstrates that social distance, measured using questions from the British Social Attitudes survey about whether people would mind having an ethnic minority boss or have a close relative marry an ethnic minority spouse, declined over the period 1983–1996. These declines were observed for attitudes towards Black and Asian ethnic minorities. Much of this change in attitudes happened in the 1990s. In the 1980s, opposition to interracial marriage were significant. Nevertheless, Ford says:

Racism and racial discrimination remain a part of everyday life for Britain's ethnic minorities. Black and Asian Britons...are less likely to be employed and are more likely to work in worse jobs, live in worse houses and suffer worse health than White Britons.

The University of Maryland's Minorities at Risk (MAR) project noted in 2006 that while African-Caribbeans in the United Kingdom no longer face formal discrimination, they continue to be under-represented in politics, and to face discriminatory barriers in access to housing and in employment practices. The project also says that the British school system "has been indicted on numerous occasions for racism, and for undermining the self-confidence of black children and maligning the culture of their parents". The MAR profile on African-Caribbeans in the United Kingdom suggests "growing 'black on black' violence between people from the Caribbean and immigrants from Africa". Martin Hewitt of the Metropolitan Police has said that murders using knives are given insufficient public attention because most victims are black people from London.

A 2014 study by the Black Training and Enterprise Group (BTEG), funded by Trust for London, explored the views of young Black males in London on why their demographic have a higher unemployment rate than any other group of young people. According to participants, racism and negative stereotyping were the main reasons for their high unemployment rate. In 2021, 67% of Black 16 to 64-year-olds were employed, compared to 76% of White British and 69% of British Asians. The employment rate for Black 16 to 24-year-olds was 31%, compared to 56% of White British and 37% of British Asians. The median hourly pay for Black Britons in 2021 was amongst the lowest out of all ethnicity groups at £12.55, ahead of only British Pakistanis and Bangladeshis. In 2023, the Office for National Statistics published more granular analysis and found that UK-born black employees (£15.18) earned more than UK-born white employees (£14.26) in 2022, while non-UK born black employees earned less (£12.95). Overall, black employees had a median hourly pay of £13.53 in 2022.

A 2023 University of Cambridge survey which featured the largest sample of Black people in Britain found that 88% had reported racial discrimination at work, 79% believed the police unfairly targeted black people with stop and search powers and 80% definitely or somewhat agreed that racial discrimination was the biggest barrier to academic attainment for young Black students.

=== Gypsy, Roma and Traveller people ===
Racism against Gypsy, Roma and Traveller people is widespread in the United Kingdom, with surveys indicating that levels of prejudice against GRT people are higher than against any other group. A 2022 YouGov poll found that 45% of people would be uncomfortable living next door to a Gypsy or Traveller, 38% would be uncomfortable with their child playing at GRT child's house, 33% would be uncomfortable with their child marrying a Gypsy or Traveller, and 34% would be uncomfortable with a Gypsy or Traveller visiting or working on their house. Negative portrayals of GRT people in the press and on television are common, and reports of hate crime against GRT people have been documented to increase in the weeks following their publication. Racist comments against Gypsies and Travellers are common on social media and newspaper websites, these frequently include incitement to violence against GRT people, wishing death upon them, and even calls for genocide.

=== South Asians ===
Racism against British Asians is committed not only by long-established white Britons but also by other immigrant races that came to the UK.

Xenophobia in modern Britain is also tied to Islamophobia and Hinduphobia, and the growing hate crimes against those within these minority groups. This is fuelled by groups such as the English Defence League (EDL) that target ethnic minorities from countries where Islam is the major religion. This is directly related to the racist notions that have been perpetuated throughout British history. The current hate against these groups can be shown to reflect the attitudes in the 1960s by politicians such as Enoch Powell and are still prevalent today in debate and discussion.

==== British India ====
Various British historians like James Mill and Charles Grant wrote influential books and essays portraying Indians as deceitful, liars, dishonest, depraved and incapable of ruling themselves.

The relationship between "Indomania" and "Indophobia" in colonial era British Indology was discussed by American Indologist Thomas Trautmann (1997) who found that Indophobia had become a norm in early 19th century Britain as the result of a conscious agenda of Evangelicalism and utilitarianism, especially by Charles Grant and James Mill. Historians noted that during the British Empire, "evangelical influence drove British policy down a path that tended to minimize and denigrate the accomplishments of Indian civilization and to position itself as the negation of the earlier British Indomania that was nourished by belief in Indian wisdom."

In Grant's highly influential "Observations on the ...Asiatic subjects of Great Britain" (1796), he criticized the Orientalists for being too respectful to Indian culture and religion. His work tried to determine the Hindus' "true place in the moral scale" and he alleged that the Hindus are "a people exceedingly depraved". Grant believed that Great Britain's duty was to civilise and Christianize the natives.

Lord Macaulay, serving on the Supreme Council of India between 1834 and 1838, was instrumental in creating the foundations of bilingual colonial India. He convinced the Governor-General to adopt English as the medium of instruction in higher education from the sixth year of schooling onwards, rather than Sanskrit or Persian. He claimed: "I have never found one among them who could deny that a single shelf of a good European library was worth the whole native literature of India and Arabia." He wrote that Arabic and Sanskrit works on medicine contain "medical doctrines which would disgrace an English Farrier – Astronomy, which would move laughter in girls at an English boarding school – History, abounding with kings thirty feet high reigns thirty thousand years long – and Geography made up of seas of treacle and seas of butter".

One of the most influential historians of India during the British Empire, James Mill was criticised for prejudice against Hindus. Horace Hayman Wilson wrote that the tendency of Mill's work was "evil". Mill claimed that both Indians and Chinese people are cowardly, unfeeling and mendacious. Both Mill and Grant attacked Orientalist scholarship that was too respectful of Indian culture: "It was unfortunate that a mind so pure, so warm in the pursuit of truth so devoted to oriental learning, as that of Sir William Jones, should have adopted the hypothesis of a high state of civilization in the principal countries of Asia."

==== Paki-bashing (1960s–1990s) ====
Starting in the late 1960s, and peaking in the 1970s and 1980s, violent gangs opposed to immigration took part in frequent attacks known as "Paki-bashing", which targeted and assaulted Pakistanis and other South Asians. "Paki-bashing" was unleashed after Enoch Powell's inflammatory Rivers of Blood speech in 1968, although there is "little agreement on the extent to which Powell was responsible for racial attacks". Powell refused to accept responsibility for any violence, or to disassociate himself from the views when questioned by David Frost in 1969, arguing that they were never associated in the first place.

These attacks peaked during the 1970s–1980s, with the attacks mainly linked to far-right fascist, racist and anti-immigrant movements, including the white power skinheads, the National Front, and the British National Party (BNP). These attacks were usually referred to as either "Paki-bashing" or "skinhead terror", with the attackers usually called "Paki-bashers" or "skinheads". "Paki-bashing" was suggested to have been fueled by perceived anti-immigrant and anti-Pakistani rhetoric from the British media at the time.

It is also suggested that this was fueled by perceived systemic failures of state authorities, which is alleged to include under-reporting racist attacks, beliefs amongst some communities that the criminal justice system was not taking racist attacks seriously, perceived racial harassment by police, and allegations of police involvement in racist violence.

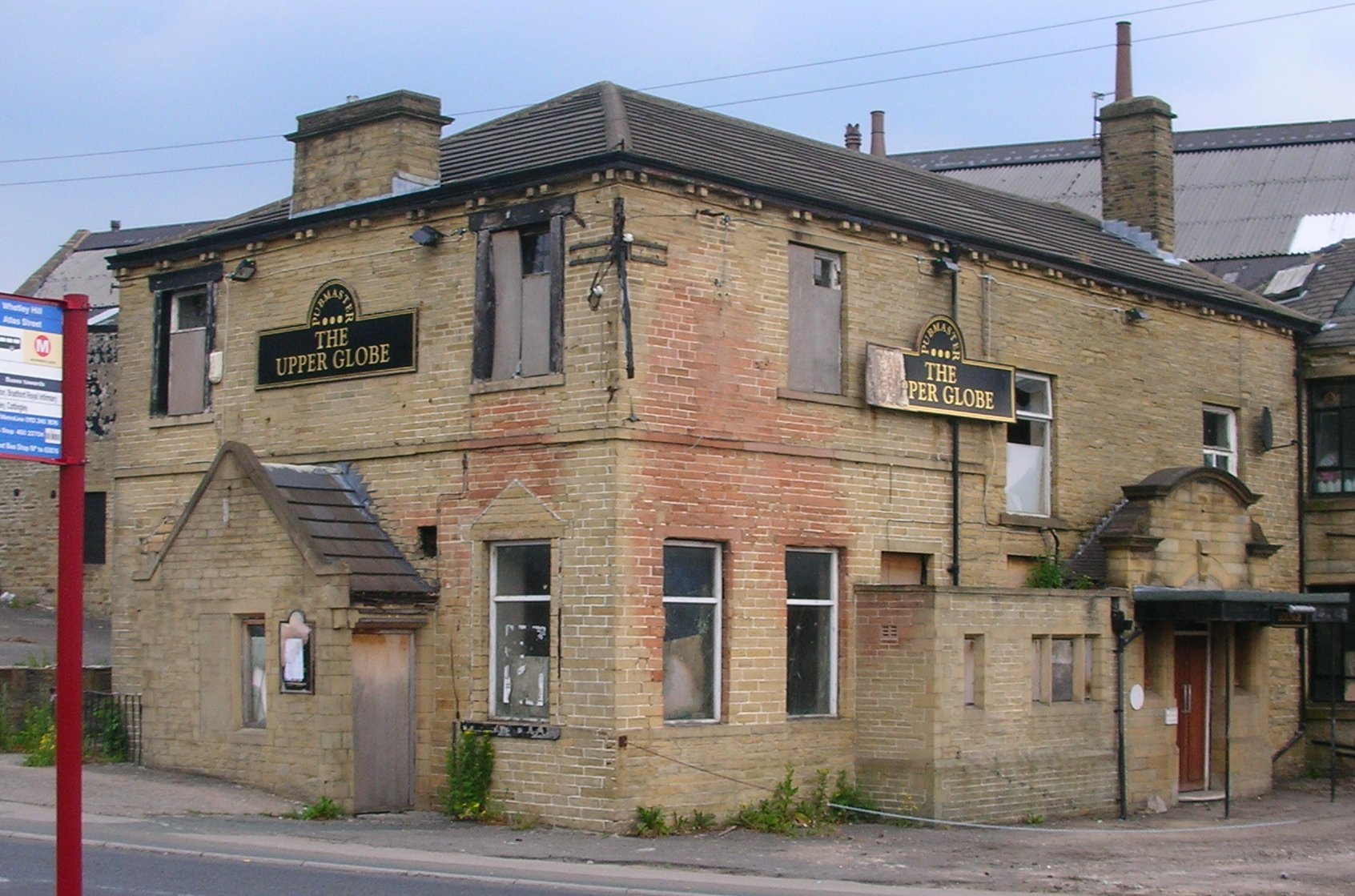
Pub damaged in the 2001 Bradford riots between White and Pakistani sectors

==== Mahesh Upadhyaya ====
In 1968, Mahesh Upadhyaya was the first person in the UK to bring up a case of racial discrimination under the Race Relations Act. He was an Indian shift engineer looking for houses. Upon seeing an advertisement for a house in Huddersfield, he was informed by the CEO of the company that they did not "sell to coloured people". Upadhyaya complained to the Race Relations Board the same day (13 December 1968), and they filed a civil action against the company in June 1969, the first of its kind in the country. In September, the judge in the case ruled that the company had engaged in unlawful discrimination under the Race Relations Act, but failed the case on a technicality.

=== Muslims ===
The Muslim community in the United Kingdom has faced significant racism and religious discrimination, particularly since the late 20th and early 21st centuries. While Islamophobia existed prior to this period, global events such as the 9/11 attacks and the 7/7 London bombings intensified anti-Muslim sentiment. This has led to a marked increase in hate crimes, verbal abuse, and discriminatory practices against Muslims, especially those who are visibly identifiable, such as women wearing hijabs or niqabs.

Historical records suggest that Muslims first arrived in Britain through trade and diplomacy as early as the 16th century. However, Muslim migration to the UK increased significantly in the mid-20th century, particularly from former British colonies in South Asia, the Middle East, and Africa.

In the years following 9/11, anti-Muslim rhetoric became more widespread, with far-right groups and media outlets often portraying Muslims as "a threat" to British society. The rise of the English Defence League (EDL) in the 2010s and other extremist groups led to public demonstrations that frequently targeted Muslim communities, contributing to social tension and incidents of violence.

Politically, Islamophobia has been a point of controversy, especially within the Conservative Party. There have been numerous reports of discriminatory comments and behavior toward Muslims, leading to internal reviews and external pressure for the party to address these issues. The All-Party Parliamentary Group on British Muslims has worked to introduce a formal definition of Islamophobia, although this has yet to be fully adopted by the government of the United Kingdom.

In recent years, hate crimes against Muslims have spiked following events such as terrorist attacks in Europe or heightened tensions in the Middle East. The Tell MAMA project, which tracks Islamophobic incidents, reported a significant increase in anti-Muslim hate crimes following the 2017 Manchester Arena bombing and the 2019 Christchurch mosque shootings. In these instances, Muslims reported feeling targeted both online and in public spaces.

Following the outbreak of the Gaza war in 2023, there was a notable rise in Islamophobic incidents in the UK. Similar to the rise in antisemitic incidents, public sentiment became increasingly polarized, with Muslim communities expressing concerns over their safety and well-being.

In 2024, riots erupted in England, fueled by false claims circulated by far-right groups that the perpetrator of a stabbing incident in Southport was a Muslim and an asylum seeker. These riots were driven by broader Islamophobic, racist, and anti-immigrant sentiments that had grown leading up to the protests. The disorder included racist attacks, arson, and looting.

=== Jews ===
Since the arrival of Jews in England following the Norman Conquest in 1066, Jews have been subjected to discrimination. Jews living in England from about the reign of King Stephen experienced religious discrimination and it is thought that the blood libel which accused Jews of ritual murder originated in England, leading to massacres and increasing discrimination. An example of early English antisemitism was the York pogrom at Clifford's Tower in 1190 which resulted in an estimated 150 Jews taking their own lives or being burned to death in the tower. The earliest recorded images of anti-semitism are found in the royal tax records from 1233. The Jewish presence in England continued until King Edward I's Edict of Expulsion in 1290.

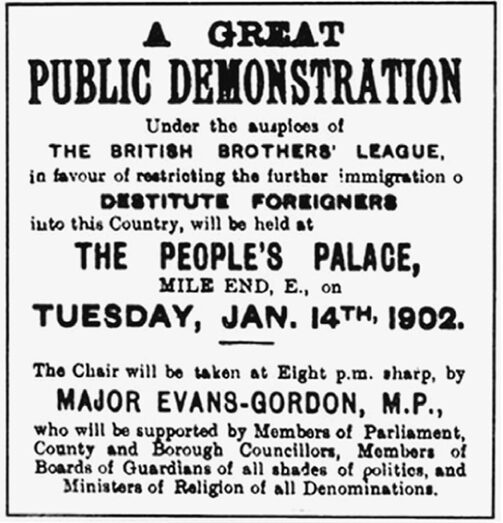
1902 rally in London England against Destitute Foreigners

In the late 19th and early 20th century, the number of Jews in Britain greatly increased due to the exodus of Jews from Russia, which resulted in a large community of Jews forming in the East End of London. Popular sentiment against immigration was used by the British Union of Fascists to incite hatred against Jews, leading to the Battle of Cable Street in 1936, at which the fascists were repulsed by Jews, Irish dock workers and communists and anti-fascists who barricaded the streets.

In the 20th century, the UK began restricting immigration under the Aliens Act 1905. Although the Act did not mention Jews specifically, "it was clear to most observers" that the act was mainly aimed at Jews fleeing persecution in Eastern Europe. Winston Churchill, then a Liberal MP, said that the Act appealed to "insular prejudice against the foreigners, to racial prejudice against the Jews, and to labour prejudice against competition".

In the aftermath of the Holocaust, undisguised, racial hatred of Jews became unacceptable in British society. However, outbursts of antisemitism emanating from far right groups continued, leading to opposition by the 43 Group, formed by Jewish ex-servicemen, which broke up fascist meetings. Far-right antisemitism was motivated principally by racial hatred, rather than Christian theological accusations of deicide.

Following an escalation in the Palestinian-Israel crisis in 2021, the number of antisemitic incidents in London increased by 500%. London Rabbis reported a general sense of fear in the community, and four people were arrested for racially aggravated public order offenses whilst brandishing Palestinian flags. On 20 October 2023, The Guardian reported that according to the Metropolitan police, there has been a 1,350% increase in hate crimes against Jewish people since the Gaza war started. In December 2023, a poll done by the Campaign Against Antisemitism found that nearly half of British Jews have considered leaving the UK in response to increased antisemitism following the October 7 attacks. Of the 140,561 hate crimes recorded by the police in England and Wales between the Gaza war's outbreak and March 2024, antisemitic offences more than doubled vis-à-vis the previous year, while allegedly anti-Muslim offences rose by 13%.

=== Chinese people ===
Michael Wilkes from the British Chinese Project said that racism against them is not taken as seriously as racism against African, African-Caribbean or South Asian people, and that a lot of racist attacks towards the British Chinese community go unreported, primarily because of widespread mistrust in the police.

==== Chinese labourers ====
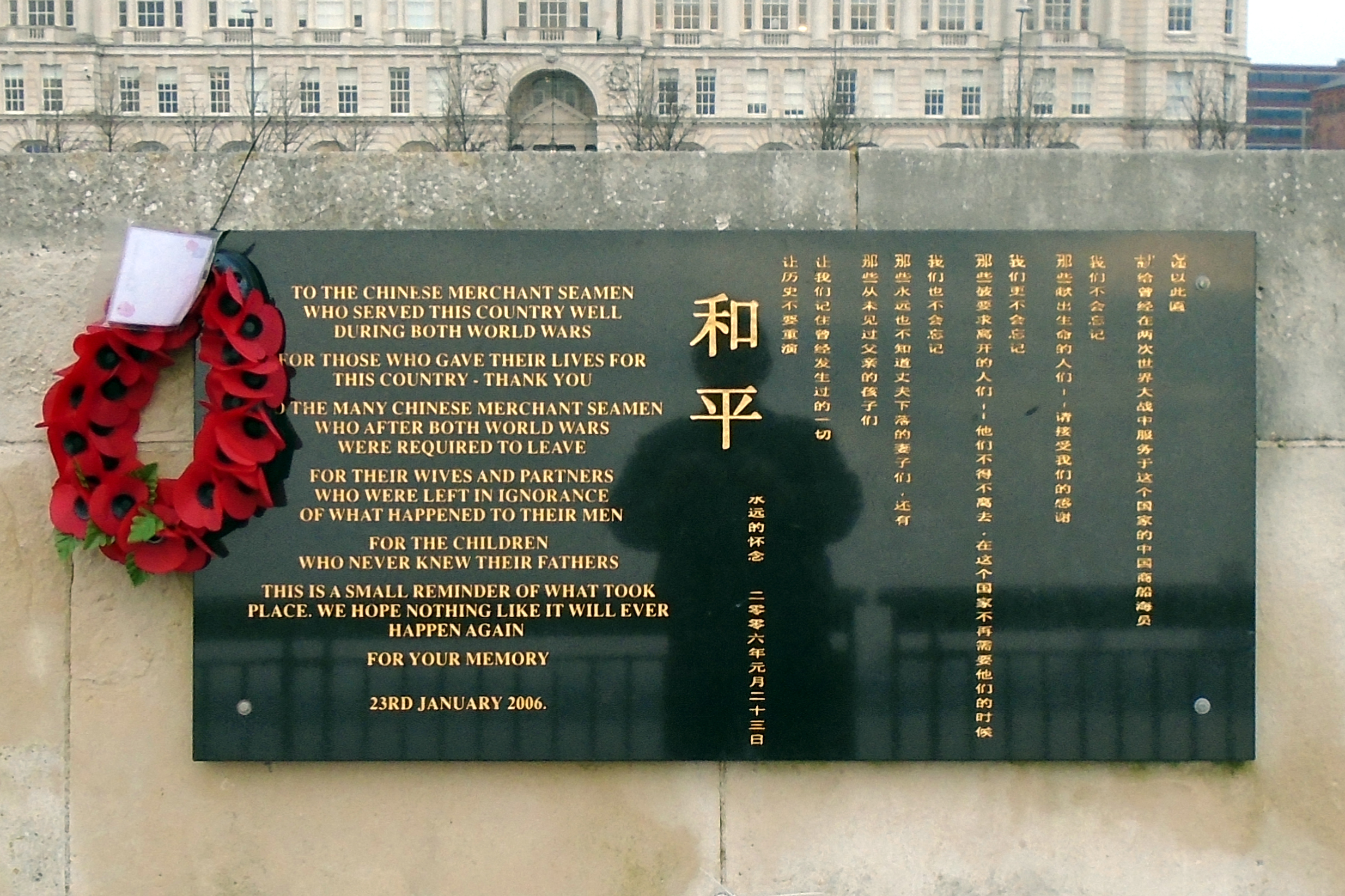
Chinese merchant seamen memorial, Liverpool's Pier Head

From the middle of the 19th century, Chinese were seen as a source for cheap labourers for the building of the British Empire. However, this resulted in animosity against Chinese labourers as competing for British jobs. Hostilities were seen when Chinese were being recruited for work in the British Transvaal Colony (present day South Africa), resulted in 28 riots between July 1904 to July 1905, and later becoming a key debating point as part of the 1906 United Kingdom general election. This would also be the source of the 1911 seamen's strike in Cardiff, which resulted in rioting and the destruction of about 30 Chinese laundries.

While Chinese were recruited to support British war efforts, after the end of the Second World War, the British Government sought to forcibly repatriate thousands of seamen in a Home Office policy HO 213/926 to "Compulsory repatriation of undesirable Chinese seamen." Many of the seamen left behind wives and mixed-race children that they would never see again. A network has also been established for families of Chinese seamen who were repatriated after the Second World War.

==== 2001 foot-and-mouth outbreak ====
Government reports in early 2001 highlighted the smuggling of illegal meat as a possible source for the 2001 United Kingdom foot-and-mouth outbreak, some of which was destined for a Chinese restaurant. Chinese catering businesses owners claimed a drop of up to 40% in business, in an industry which had some 12,000 Chinese takeaways and 3,000 Chinese restaurants in the United Kingdom, and made up about 80% of the British Chinese workforce at the time. Community leaders saw this as racist and xenophobic, with a scapegoating of the British Chinese community for the spread of the disease.

==== COVID-19 pandemic ====
On 12 February 2020, Sky News reported that some British Chinese said they were facing increasing levels of racist abuse during the COVID-19 pandemic. It was recorded that hate crimes against British Chinese people between January and March 2020 have tripled the number of hate crimes in the past two years in the UK. According to the London Metropolitan Police, between January and June 2020, 457 race-related crimes had occurred against British East and Southeast Asians.

Verbal abuse has been one of the common forms of racism experienced by British Chinese. Just before the lockdown in February 2020, British Chinese children recalled experiences of fear and frustration due to bullying and name calling in their schools. According to a June 2020 poll, 76% of British Chinese had received racial slurs at least once, and 50% regularly received racial slurs, a significantly higher frequency than experienced by any other racial minority. Racism during the pandemic has also impacted a number of Chinese-owned business, especially within the catering business, as well as an increase in violent assaults against British East and Southeast Asians.

=== White people ===
In the 2011 census, the White British population was 49,997,686, 81.5% of Great Britain's total population. For the entire United Kingdom, due to different reporting measures within Northern Ireland which includes all those who identified as British with those who identified as Irish, an amalgamated total of 52,320,080 is given. This accounts for 82.8% of the population and includes individuals who identified as White Irish in Great Britain. In the 2021 Census, the White British group numbered 44,355,044 or 74.4% of the population of England and Wales.

Prominent examples of racially-motivated crimes and discrimination against white British include that of Richard Norman Everitt, in 1994, a 15-year-old white English teenager, who was stabbed to death in London. After ethnic tensions in his neighbourhood, Somers Town, Everitt was murdered by a gang of British Bangladeshis who were seeking revenge against another white boy. A judge described the killing as "an unprovoked racial attack". In 2001, Ross Parker, a 17-year-old white English teenager, was murdered by a gang of Pakistani men in a racially motivated attack in Peterborough. In 2004, Kriss Donald, a 15-year-old white Scottish teenager, was kidnapped and murdered by three Pakistani men in Glasgow "for being white". In 2018, Ella Hill, a survivor of the Rotherham child sexual exploitation scandal, said she faced serious racial abuse by her attackers. Race was suggested as one of the factors involved in the failure to address the abuse. Another victim said she was told that being raped "is what white girls were for" when she was attacked as a teenager in Rotherham, the court jury heard.

In 2011, Rhea Page, a white British woman, was assaulted by a group of four women of Somali descent in Leicester. According to reports, the attackers shouted anti-white racial slurs during the assault. The incident gained significant media attention, particularly because the judge decided not to charge the attackers with racially aggravated assault. Instead, they were given suspended sentences, with the judge citing cultural differences and difficult upbringings as factors in his decision.

==== Employment and recruitment ====
In 2019, an employment tribunal found that Cheshire Police rejected a "well prepared" potential recruit because he was a white heterosexual male. The force was subsequently found guilty of "direct discrimination on the grounds of his sexual orientation, race and sex". The tribunal said that "positive discrimination" could only be used to choose between two equally qualified applicants, and that the police force had not shown that this was the case.

In 2023, the Royal Air Force's former head of recruitment said that 160 white men were discriminated against when the RAF prioritised applicants who were women and ethnic minorities. Chairman of the defence select committee Tobias Ellwood said that the RAF's attempts to improve diversity through positive discrimination could have a significant impact "on the RAF's operational performance".

==== Grooming gangs ====
Since the 2000s, there have been several high-profile cases where groups of men, known as grooming gangs, have targeted girls for sex and prostitution. In many cases, the men involved were of South Asian heritage and the girls were white, including the Rotherham child sexual exploitation scandal, the Rochdale child sex abuse ring, the Halifax child sex abuse ring, and the Keighley child sex abuse ring. An investigation in Telford found that up to 1,000 girls were abused and that cases were not investigated because of "nervousness about race". Several Conservative and Reform UK politicians have described these cases as racism. For example, after a 2017 case in Newcastle, former Conservative policing and justice minister Mike Penning urged Attorney General Jeremy Wright to consider the offences as racially motivated. The judge presiding over the case in question ruled that the girls were not targeted for their race.

In 2023, then Home Secretary Suella Braverman was criticised when she said the perpetrators in high-profile grooming gang cases were "almost all British-Pakistani" men, which critics said was using a "dog whistle" and perpetuating stereotypes. The Home Office said her comments referred specifically to three cases in Rochdale, Rotherham, and Telford. In 2025, former Home Office minister Robert Jenrick said that group-based child sexual exploitation is "perhaps the greatest racially motivated crime in modern Britain", and said it was covered up by the British state to protect community relations.

The British media has been accused of perpetuating Islamophobia by "conflating the faith of Islam with criminality, such as the headlines 'Muslim sex grooming'", as well as pursuing sensationalist coverage. A number of academics have described the controversy as a moral panic. Media outlets including The Times, The Daily Mail's Mail Online, The Guardian and The Telegraph have been accused of boosting the moral panic by turning South Asian men into "folk devils", especially in the wake of various high-profile sex abuse scandals.

=== Italians ===
An early manifestation of anti-Italianism in Britain was in 1820, at the time when King George IV sought to dissolve his marriage to Caroline of Brunswick. A sensational proceeding, the Pains and Penalties Bill 1820, was held at the House of Lords in an effort to prove Caroline's adultery; since she had been living in Italy, many prosecution witnesses were from among her servants. The prosecution's reliance on Italian witnesses of low repute led to anti-Italian sentiment in Britain. The witnesses had to be protected from angry mobs, and were depicted in popular prints and pamphlets as venal, corrupt and criminal. Street-sellers sold prints alleging that the Italians had accepted bribes to commit perjury.

Anti-Italianism broke out again, in a more sustained way, a century later. After Benito Mussolini's alliance with Nazi Germany in the late 1930s, there was a growing hostility towards Italy in the United Kingdom. The British media ridiculed the Italian capacity to fight in a war, pointing to the poor state of the Italian military during its imperialistic phase. A comic strip, which began running in 1938 in the British comic The Beano, was entitled "Musso the Wop". The strip featured Mussolini as an arrogant buffoon.

Wigs on the Green was a novel by Nancy Mitford first published in 1935. It was a merciless satire of British fascism and the Italians living in the United Kingdom who supported it. The book is notable for lampooning the political enthusiasms of Mitford's sister Diana Mosley, and her links with some Italians in Great Britain who promoted the British Union of Fascists of Oswald Mosley. Furthermore, the announcement of Benito Mussolini's decision to side with Adolf Hitler's Germany in the spring of 1940 caused an immediate response. By order of Parliament, all enemy aliens were to be interned, although there were few active Italian fascists. This anti-Italian feeling led to a night of nationwide riots against the Italian communities in June 1940. The Italians were now seen as a national security threat linked to the feared British Fascism movement, and Winston Churchill gave instructions to "collar the lot!". Thousands of Italian men between the ages of 17 and 60 were arrested after his speech.

=== Central and Eastern Europeans ===
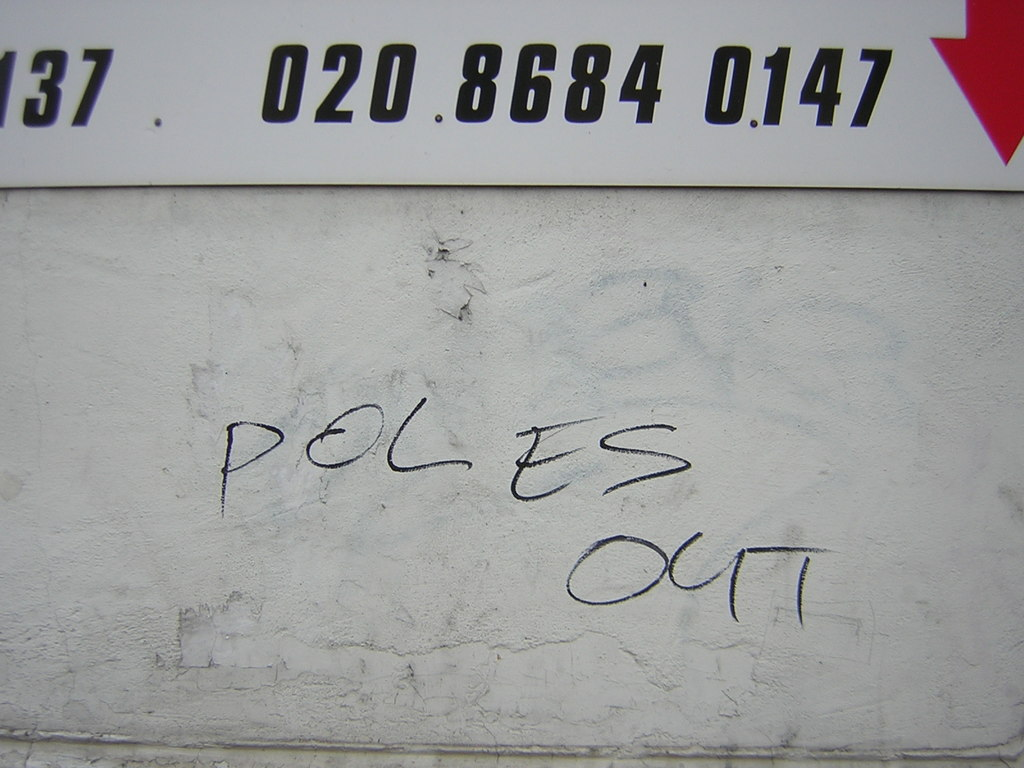
Anti-Polish graffiti in Thornton Heath, 2011

Following EU enlargement in 2004, the UK experienced mass immigration from Poland and other Central and Eastern European countries. There has been a sharp increase in xenophobia against Central, Southern and Eastern European immigrants. In 2007, Polish people living in Britain reported 42 "racially motivated violent attacks" against them. The far-right British National Party (BNP) expressed anti-Polish sentiments in their political campaigns, and campaigned for a ban on all Polish migrant workers to Britain. In 2009, the Federation of Poles in Great Britain and the Polish Embassy in London with Barbara Tuge-Erecinska raised a number of formal complaints – including with the Press Complaints Commission – about news articles in the Daily Mail, which the Federation claimed "displayed anti-Polish sentiment".

==== Brexit-related racism ====
Since Brexit, there has been a noticeable increase in xenophobia towards Eastern Europeans, especially Poles, Romanians and Bulgarians. After the Brexit referendum resulted in the UK leaving the EU, many Poles reported that they had been verbally abused in public. Romanians living in northern England also reported racist abuse in public and expressed fears they were being stereotyped as 'Gypsies', despite Romanians not being Roma. There are also reports of members of minority groups of European descent reporting racist abuse to police, with the police not taking action.

=== Irish people ===
Since the formation of Northern Ireland in 1921, there have been tensions between Protestants, who tend to refer to themselves as British, and Catholics, who tend to refer to themselves as Irish. This has been called a form of racism by some international bodies.

In 1923, the General Assembly of the Church of Scotland approved a report entitled The Menace of the Irish race to our Scottish Nationality, which called for "means to be found to preserve Scotland and the Scottish race and to secure in future generations the traditions, ideals and faith of a great people, unspoiled and inviolate."

In 1934, the writer J. B. Priestley published the travelogue English Journey, in which he wrote "A great many speeches have been made and books written on the subject of what England has done to Ireland... I should be interested to hear a speech and read a book or two on the subject of what Ireland has done to England... if we do have an Irish Republic as our neighbour, and it is found possible to return her exiled citizens, what a grand clearance there will be in all the western ports, from the Clyde to Cardiff, what a fine exit of ignorance and dirt and drunkenness and disease."

In 1937, ten young men and boys, aged from 13 to 23, burned to death in a fire on a farm in Kirkintilloch, Scotland. All were seasonal workers from Achill Sound in County Mayo, Ireland. The Vanguard, the official newspaper of the Scottish Protestant League, referred to the event in the following text:

The Scandal of Kirkintilloch is not that some Irishmen have lost their lives in a fire; it is that Irish Papists brought up in disloyalty and superstition are engaged in jobs which should belong by right to Scottish Protestants. The Kirkintilloch sensation again reminds the People of Scotland that Rome's Irish Scum still over-run our land.

According to a 2004 report published by the Irish Department of Foreign Affairs, Irish soldiers serving in the British Expeditionary Force (BEF) during World War I were treated more harshly in courts-martial because "British military courts were anti-Irish".

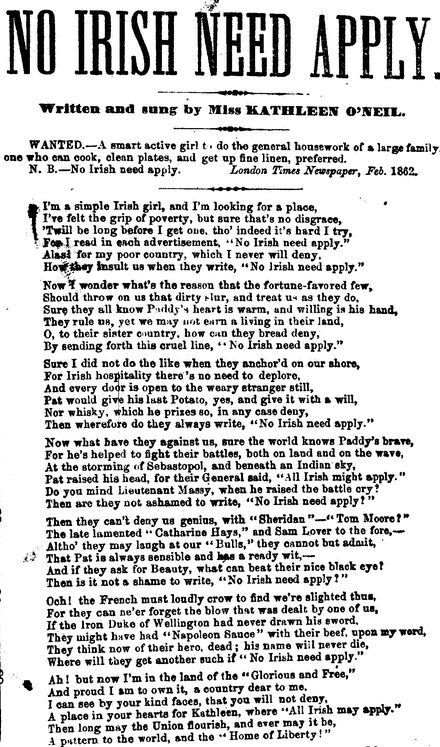
London version of NINA song, Feb. 1862

In the post-World War II years, signs which read "No Irish need apply" and "No Irish, no blacks, no dogs" or similar reportedly appeared in the United Kingdom.

In 2002, English journalist Julie Burchill narrowly escaped prosecution for incitement to racial hatred, following a column in The Guardian where she described Ireland as being synonymous with "child molestation, Nazi-sympathising, and the oppression of women". She had expressed anti-Irish sentiment several times throughout her career, announcing in Time Out, "I hate the Irish, I think they're appalling."

In July 2012, The Irish Times published a report on anti-Irish prejudice in Britain. It claimed that far-right British nationalist groups continued to use "anti-IRA" marches as "an excuse to attack and intimidate Irish immigrants". Shortly before the 2012 Summer Olympics, British athlete Daley Thompson was shown an image of a runner with a misspelt tattoo and said that the person responsible for the misspelling "must have been Irish". The BBC issued an apology.

On 25 June 2013, an Irish flag was burned at an Orange Order headquarters in the Everton area of Liverpool. This was seen by members of Liverpool's Irish community, which is the biggest in the UK, as a hate crime.

In March 2021, the Equality and Human Rights Commission said it had investigated British holiday park operator Pontins after a whistleblower revealed that Pontins maintained a blacklist of common Irish surnames to prevent Irish Travellers from entering its parks.

=== Between minority groups ===
Both the Bradford riots and the Oldham Riots occurred in 2001, following cases of racism. These were either the public displays of racist sentiment or, as in the Brixton Riots, racial profiling and harassment by police forces. In 2005, there were the Birmingham riots, derived from ethnic tensions between the British African-Caribbean people and British Asian communities, with the spark for the riot being an unsubstantiated gang rape of a teenage black girl by a group of South Asian men.

== By constituent country ==
=== Scotland ===
In 2006, 1,543 victims of racist crime in Scotland were of Pakistani origin, while more than 1,000 victims were classed as being "White British". In February 2011, attacks on ethnic minorities in Scotland had contributed to a 20% increase in racist incidents over the previous twelve months. Reports said every day in Scotland, seventeen people are abused, threatened or violently attacked because of the colour of their skin, ethnicity or nationality. Statistics showed that just under 5,000 incidents of racism were recorded in 2009/10, a slight decrease from racist incidents recorded in 2008/9. From 2004 to 2012, the rate of racist incidents has been around 5,000 incidents per year. In 2011–12, there were 5,389 racist incidents recorded by the police, which is a 10% increase on the 4,911 racist incidents recorded in 2010–11. In 2009, the murder of an Indian sailor named Kunal Mohanty by a White-Scotsman named Christopher Miller resulted in Miller's conviction as a criminal motivated by racial hatred. Miller's brother gave evidence during the trial and said Miller told him he had "done a paki".

A new hate crime law, which carries a maximum sentence of seven years in jail, has come into force since 1 April 2024. By early October 2024, the Police Scotland had recorded over 5,400 hate crimes, most related to race and age. Some celebrities, such as J.K. Rowling, have been critical of the law over free speech concern.

=== Northern Ireland ===
Northern Ireland had in 2004 the highest number of racist incidents per person in the UK, and has been branded the "race-hate capital of Europe". Foreigners are three times more likely to suffer a racist incident in Northern Ireland than elsewhere in the UK.

According to police, most racist incidents happen in loyalist Protestant areas, and members of loyalist paramilitary groups have orchestrated a series of racist attacks aimed at "ethnically cleansing" these areas. There have been pipe bomb, petrol bomb and gun attacks on the homes of immigrants and people of different ethnic origins. Masked gangs have also ransacked immigrants' homes and assaulted the residents. In 2009, more than 100 Romanians were forced to flee their homes in Belfast following sustained attacks by a racist mob, who allegedly threatened to kill them. That year, a Polish immigrant was beaten to death in a racist attack in Newry. Police recorded more than 1,100 racist incidents in 2013/14, but they believe most incidents are not reported to them. Race Riots

- 2025 Northern Ireland riots
- 2026 Northern Ireland riots

=== Wales ===
An anti-Irish race riot took place in 1848 in the largely Irish immigrant Cardiff suburb of Newtown.

At the time of the First World War, Cardiff's docks area had the largest black and Asian population outside of London. In June 1919 riots took place in Newport, Cardiff and Barry with non-whites being attacked and their property destroyed. The events were not acknowledged or recorded until the 1980s.

== Institutional ==
=== Police ===
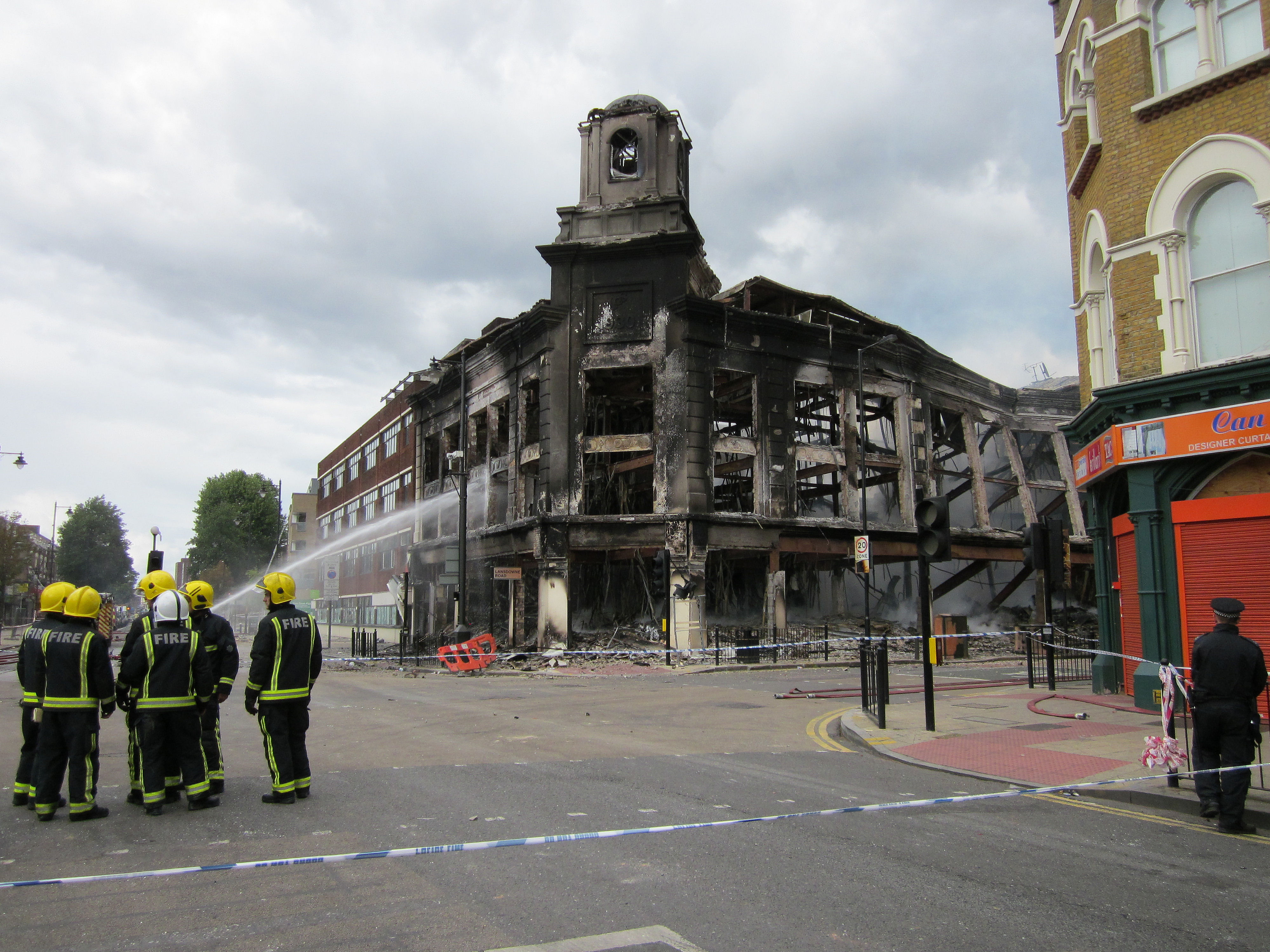
Firefighters dousing a shop and flats destroyed by arson during the 2011 England riots

Various police forces in the United Kingdom (such as the Greater Manchester Police, the London Metropolitan Police, the Sussex Police and the West Yorkshire Police services) have been accused of institutionalised racism throughout the late 20th and 21st centuries, by people such as the Chief Constable of the GMP in 1998 (David Wilmot), the BBC's Secret Policeman documentary five years later (which led to the resignation of six officers), and Metropolitan Police Commissioner Bernard Hogan-Howe. In November 2009, the Home Office published a study that suggested that once other variables were accounted for, ethnicity was not a significant predictor of offending, anti-social behaviour or drug abuse among young people. Despite this, disparities in policing still exist.

According to the Metropolitan Police Authority in 2002–3, of the 17 deaths in police custody, 10 were black or Asian – black convicts have a disproportionately higher rate of incarceration than other ethnicities. A 2012 study found that Black people were seven times more likely to be stopped and searched by police compared to white people, according to the Home Office. A separate study said black people were more than nine times more likely to be searched.

As of 2018, black people were still disproportionately arrested more than white people – 9% of all arrests are black people. From the 10 years up until 2018, black people were more than twice as likely to die in police custody than white people. Of the 164 people who died in or following police custody in England and Wales, 13 were black, accounting for 8% of deaths compared to the ~3% of the English and Welsh population that identified as black in the 2011 census. Between 2017–8 and 2018–9, 39 people died in custody as a result of excessive force. Of this number, 30% were black. Once arrested, however, a white individual was about 25% more likely overall to die in custody than a black individual.

Cressida Dick, head of the Metropolitan Police's anti-racism unit in 2003, remarked that it was "difficult to imagine a situation where we will say we are no longer institutionally racist".

==== The Macpherson Inquiry ====
In 1997, Home Secretary Jack Straw, ordered a public inquiry into the police's handling of the murder of Stephen Lawrence. Lawrence, an 18-year-old black British citizen from London, was murdered in a racially motivated attack while waiting for a bus in 1993. The inquiry was led by a judge, Sir William Macpherson, and officially titled "The Inquiry Into The Matters Arising From The Death of Stephen Lawrence". It was published as The Macpherson report.

Published in February 1999, the report considered "more than 100,000 pages of reports, statements, and other written or printed documents" to reach its conclusions. The report concluded that the original Metropolitan Police Service was institutionally racist, and that its investigation into Lawrence's murder had been incompetent. The report said that officers had committed fundamental errors, including failing to give first aid when they reached the scene, failing to follow obvious leads during their investigation, and failing to arrest suspects. The report found that there had been a failure of leadership by senior Metropolitan Police officers and that recommendations of the 1981 Scarman Report, compiled following the 1981 race-related riots in Brixton and Toxteth, had been ignored. Detective Superintendent Brian Weeden said mistakes had been made in the murder investigation, including on basic points of criminal law.

A total of 70 recommendations for reform, covering both policing and criminal law, were made. These proposals included abolishing the double jeopardy rule and criminalising racist statements made in private. Macpherson also called for reform in the British Civil Service, local governments, the National Health Service, schools, and the judicial system, to address issues of institutional racism across society. The publication in 1999 of the resulting Macpherson Report has been called "one of the most important moments in the modern history of criminal justice in Britain".

==== The Lammy Review ====
The Lammy Review outlined treatment of Black, Asian and Minority Ethnic individuals in the policing and criminal justice system and found significant racial bias in the UK justice system. Using the most recent statistics from the Home Office and Ministry of Justice, the Lammy Review stated that in 2018-19:

- black people were over nine times more likely to stopped and searched by police as white people.
- black people were more than three times as likely to be arrested as white people.
- black people were more than five times as likely to have force used against them by police as white people.
- black, Asian and minority ethnic people constituted a quarter of the prison population, despite representing just 14% of the population.
- black, Asian and minority ethnic people constituted half of all prisoners in young offenders institutions.

==== Prisons ====
In 2010, black Britons accounted for around 2.2% of the general UK population, but made up 15% of the British prison population, which experts say is "a result of decades of racial prejudice in the criminal justice system and an overly punitive approach to penal affairs." This proportion decreased to 12.4% by the end of 2022 even though black Britons now made up only around 3–4% of the British population. In 2020, 32% of children in prison were black in contrast to 47% of prisoners aged under 18 being white. The Lammy Review, led by David Lammy MP, provided potential reasons on the disproportionate number of black children in prisons including austerity in public services, lack of diversity in the judiciary, and the school system inadequately serving the black community by failing to identify learning difficulties.

=== Prison ===
Prison guards are almost twice as likely to be reported for racism than inmates in the UK, with racist incidents between prison guards themselves being nearly as high as that between guards and prisoners. The environment has been described as a dangerous breeding ground for racist extremism.

=== Criminal justice system ===
It has been suggested that lower rates of guilty pleas has led to black and Asian teenage boys and young men to be sent to prison at higher rates than white counterparts, and therefore more likely to get long sentences for homicide and other crimes. However, the study does not account for previous convictions. David Lammy stated, "Clearly when someone commits a crime, they need to be punished. However, we cannot have one rule for one group of people and a different rule for another group of people. As I found in my 2017 review of the criminal justice system, some of the difference in sentencing is the result of a 'trust deficit'. Many BAME defendants simply still do not believe that the justice system will deliver less punitive treatment if they plead guilty. It's vital that all parts of the criminal justice system work hard to address these discrepancies, so that the same crime leads to the same sentence, regardless of ethnicity."

=== Local Government ===
In 2000, construction worker Kelly Davis successfully brought a racial discrimination case against Wansdyke District Council in Somerset. Over several years, Davis had multiple planning applications for land development rejected, while similar proposals by white applicants were approved. The Bristol County Court found that council officers had treated Davis in a "consistently unhelpful and obstructive fashion" and concluded that the conduct was racially motivated; Davis was reportedly the only Black builder in the district at the time. The council agreed to a settlement covering compensation and legal costs.

=== Healthcare ===
An area where racism is pervasive is in healthcare and health-related systems and infrastructure. There is overwhelming evidence of racism in the National Health Service, Medical and Nursing Professional Regulators, and the Healthcare and social care industry. Although the evidence is vast, there is a constant attempt to cover up, suppress, and deny these. Admission of racism in this sector is rare, usually unwholesome, and usually inadequate to effect changes other than superficial and cosmetic 'system changes'. People classified as Black and other minorities are the most severely impacted, consequently, they are the most likely to suffer consequences that criminalize, demote, under-employ, under-promote, harshly, or severely inflict consequences on individuals, families, and communities.

Out of all ethnicity groups, black people were the most likely to be overweight or obese, the most likely to be dependent on drugs, as well as the most likely to have common mental health problems (with black women especially effected). Black women are also 3.7 times more likely to die from childbirth than white women in the UK, equating to 34 women per 100,000 giving birth. Racist attitudes towards the pain tolerances of black women have been suggested as one reason why this disparity exists.

In 2021, black Britons had the highest rate of STIs with a new STI rate of 1702.6 per 100,000 population compared to 373.9 per 100,000 population in the White British population. This is consistent with data since at least 1994, and potential reasons to explain the difference include poor healthy literacy, underlying socioeconomic factors, and racism in healthcare settings. In 2022, the British Medical Journal reported findings from a survey revealing 65% of black people have said that they had experienced prejudice from doctors and other staff in healthcare settings, rising to 75% among black 18-34 year olds. Another survey found that 64% of black people in the UK believe that the NHS provides better care to white people.

During the COVID-19 pandemic in the United Kingdom, the black population faced severe disparity in outcomes compared to the white population, with early data between March and April 2020 revealing that black people were four times more likely to die with Covid-19 than white people. An inquiry commissioned for the government found that racism contributed to the disproportionate mortality among black people. As the Covid-19 vaccine began to be distributed, the UK Household Longitudinal Study found that 72% of black people were unlikely or very unlikely to get vaccinated compared to 82% of all people saying they were likely or very likely to get the jab. In March 2021, uptake was 30% lower for the black population aged 50–60 compared to the same age group in the white population. Vaccine hesitancy was driven by unethical health treatments towards black people in the past, with many surveyed citing the Tuskegee Syphilis Study in the United States as an example. Another reason given was the lack of trust in the authorities and the perception that black people were being targeted as guinea pigs for the vaccine which was spurred by misinformation online and some religious organisations. Analysis from the Commission on Race and Ethnic Disparities suggested that the increased risk of dying from COVID-19 was mainly due to the increased risk of contracting the disease. Black people were more likely to live in urban areas with higher population densities and levels of deprivation, increasing their exposure. They were also more likely to work in higher risk occupations such as healthcare or transport, and to live with older relatives who themselves are at higher risk due to their age or having other comorbidities such as diabetes and obesity.

== Official interventions ==
The Race Relations Act 1965 outlawed public discrimination, and established the Race Relations Board. Further Acts in 1968 and 1976 outlawed discrimination in employment, housing and social services, and replaced the Race Relations Board with Commission for Racial Equality that merged into the Equality and Human Rights Commission in 2004. The Human Rights Act 1998 made organisations in the UK, including public authorities, subject to the European Convention on Human Rights. The Race Relations Amendment Act 2000 extends existing legislation for the public sector to the police force, and requires public authorities to promote equality.

Polls in the 1960s and 1970s showed that racial prejudice was widespread among the British population at the time. A Gallup poll, for example, showed that 75% of the population were sympathetic to Enoch Powell's views expressed in his Rivers of Blood speech. An NOP poll showed that approximately 75% of the British population agreed with Powell's demand for non-white immigration to be halted completely, and about 60% agreed with his inflammatory call for the repatriation of non-whites already resident in Britain.

A 1981 report identified both "racial discrimination" and an "extreme racial disadvantage" in the UK, concluding that urgent action was needed to prevent these issues becoming an "endemic, ineradicable disease threatening the very survival of our society". The era saw an increase in attacks on black and Asian people by white people. The Joint Campaign Against Racism committee reported that there had been more than 20,000 attacks on British people of colour, including Britons of South Asian origin, during 1985.

== See also ==
- Antisemitism in the United Kingdom
  - Antisemitism in the UK Conservative Party
  - Antisemitism in the British Labour Party
- Anti-German sentiment
- Anti-Romani sentiment
- Almondbury Community School bullying incident
- British nationalism
  - English nationalism
- Environmental racism in the United Kingdom
- Euroscepticism in the United Kingdom
- Far-right politics#United Kingdom
  - Far-right politics in the United Kingdom
- Institutional racism in the United Kingdom
- Islamophobia in the United Kingdom
  - Islamophobia in the British Conservative Party
  - Islamophobia in the British Labour Party
- Murder of Kriss Donald
- Murder of Ross Parker
- Murder of Stephen Lawrence
- Pavlo Lapshyn
- Race and crime in the United Kingdom
- Racism by country
  - Racism in the British Conservative Party
- Radical right (Europe)
