= Bernard Fernyhough =

British priest (1932–2000)

Bernard Fernyhough (2 September 1932 – 19 February 2000) was an Anglican priest. He was the Archdeacon of Oakham from 1977 to 1999.

Fernyhough was educated at Wolstanton Grammar School and Saint David's College, Lampeter. He was ordained in 1955 and his first appointment was as Precentor at Trinidad Cathedral. He was then Rector of Stoke Bruerne and Vicar of Ravensthorpe before his years as an archdeacon. He died on 19 February 2000.

== Notes ==
Church of England titles
| Preceded by Frank Noel Towndrow | Archdeacon of Oakham; 1977–1999 | Succeeded by David Scott Painter |
