= Robert Lightfoot (priest) =

British Anglican priest and theologian

Robert Henry Lightfoot FBA (30 September 1883 – 24 November 1953) was an Anglican priest and theologian, who was Dean Ireland's Professor of the Exegesis of Holy Scripture at the University of Oxford from 1934 to 1949.

== Life ==
Lightfoot was the youngest son of Prideaux Lightfoot, Archdeacon of Oakham, and grandson of a former Rector of Exeter College, Oxford. He was born on 30 September 1883 and was educated at Uppingham School and Eton College before studying classics and then theology at Worcester College, Oxford. He was advised that he was not good enough to obtain an academic job, so became curate of a parish in Haslemere in 1909. However, in 1912, he was offered a position at Wells Theological College, becoming Vice-Principal in 1913 and Principal in 1916. Lightfoot was chaplain to Edward Stuart Talbot, Bishop of Winchester, between 1917 and 1919 when the college was closed because of the war.

After briefly returning to Wells in 1919, he was appointed as chaplain and Fellow of Lincoln College, Oxford, moving in 1921 to New College as Fellow, Tutor and Dean of Divinity. He was appointed as Dean Ireland's Professor of the Exegesis of Holy Scripture in 1934, and was then less involved in college affairs: up until then he had undertaken many administrative tasks to make up for the lesser teaching burden that he had compared to other colleagues at New College. He resigned his professorship in 1949; after he ceased to be a Fellow of New College in 1950, he was appointed to an Extraordinary Fellowship at Lincoln College.

He was regarded as a "lucid and accurate" lecturer. He concentrated his work on the four gospels, particularly the Gospel of Mark. He was described as "zealous in promoting Biblical research" at Oxford, but published little as he was "a hesitant writer with an unfeigned horror of inaccuracy". However, his St John's Gospel: A Commentary was published posthumously in 1957, edited by C F Evans. His 1934 Bampton Lectures, History and Interpretation in the Gospels, were regarded even by those who disagreed with him as "an important contribution to the study of the New Testament."

He was acting editor of the Journal of Theological Studies from 1940 to 1947 (when the official editor was Godfrey Rolles Driver) and sole editor from 1948 to 1953. Lightfoot died in Oxford on 24 November 1953. He was unmarried.
