= Gordon Steele =

Gordon Steele may refer to:

- Gordon Charles Steele (1892–1981), English recipient of the Victoria Cross
- Gordon Steele (priest) (born 1955), Anglican priest
