= Fatima Manji =

English television journalist and newsreader

- Manji at the British Library in 2022
- Born: 28 November 1985 (age 40); Peterborough, England
- Education: London School of Economics
- Employer: Channel 4 News

Fatima Manji (born 28 November 1985) is a British television journalist and newsreader, working for Channel 4 News. Manji became Britain's first hijab-wearing TV newsreader in March 2016.

== Early life ==
Manji was born in Peterborough in 1985. She lived in Netherton, Peterborough and was educated at Jack Hunt School. She was active at the city's Burton Street Mosque and later studied Politics at the London School of Economics. She "made a really informed career decision at the age of eight. I wanted to be where history is made, I wanted to be in the centre of things", she told The Guardian in December 2016 about wanting to become a journalist. "No one told me I'd be standing in a muddy field talking about floods, in waders. Maybe if they had, I'd have rethought".

== Life and career ==
She began her career in journalism as a trainee at the BBC, reporting for BBC Radio Cambridgeshire and later becoming a reporter and presenter for BBC Look East. During her period with the BBC, she investigated hate crime against migrants and pressure on housing services. She also reported for the BBC World Service from Sarajevo, Bosnia. In 2012, Manji joined Channel 4 News as a Reporter and became a newsreader in March 2016. "Channel 4 News is to be commended for pioneering this move, particularly as a mere 0.4% of British journalists are Muslim", wrote Remona Aly, citing a study by City University London, in an article for The Guardian about Manji wearing a hijab, or headscarf. In 2015, Manji presented Britain's first ever alternative election debate featuring young leaders on Channel 4.

In 2015, Manji was a finalist for the Royal Television Society's Young Journalist of the Year award. Manji was also finalist in the Broadcast category of the Words by Women Awards for female journalists. She was named "Media Personality of the Year" at the Asian Media Awards in 2016.

=== Kelvin MacKenzie column ===
In July 2016, Kelvin MacKenzie wrote a column for The Sun in which he questioned whether it was appropriate for Manji to present the news wearing a hijab following the 2016 Nice truck attack. Manji responded to MacKenzie in a comment piece for the Liverpool Echo in which she referred to The Sun's coverage of the Hillsborough disaster, and the contentious and inaccurate front page put together by MacKenzie.

Ofcom received 17 complaints about Manji's appearance in a hijab on Channel 4 News shortly after the Nice attack but found there was no basis in the Broadcasting Code leading them to investigate further. The Independent Press Standards Organisation (IPSO) received more than 1,700 complaints over MacKenzie's article. Kelvin MacKenzie was "entitled", IPSO ruled on 19 October 2016, to criticise Manji: "The article did not include a prejudicial or pejorative reference to the complainant on the grounds of her religion". Manji responded to the ruling on the BBC Radio 4 Today programme objecting to the implied suggestion "that I am somehow sympathetic to a perpetrator of a terrorist attack" and commenting "effectively it is" now "open season on minorities, and Muslims in particular".
