= Towndrow =

Towndrow is a surname. Notable people with the surname include:

- Frank Towndrow (1911–2007), Anglican priest
- Lee Towndrow, American visual artist
- Paul Towndrow (born 1978), Scottish musician
