= Membership and support of the English Defence League =

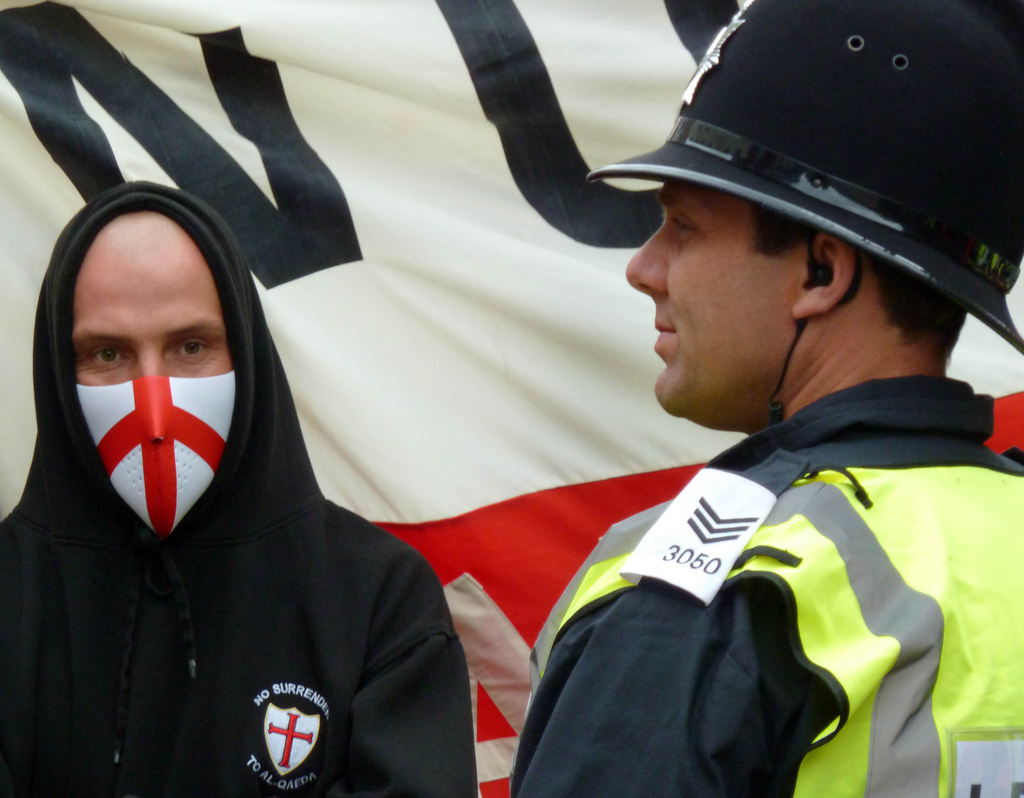
EDL supporter and a police officer at an EDL march

The size of the EDL movement has been difficult to gauge. One British Sociologist noted that within a year and a half of the group's formation it had "grown substantially" but that it is "extremely difficult to know exactly how big or how well supported the EDL is." The organisation has no official system of membership, or formal means of joining, and thus no membership list. In 2011, Bartlett and Littler estimated that between 25,000 and 35,000 people were active members in the EDL movement. They believed about half of these had attended demonstrations and that the highest concentration was in the Greater London area. On the basis of her research with the group, Pilkington suggested that there was a "high turnover in the movement", while Winlow, Hall, and Treadwell observed that members "drift in and out of its activities". The internet hacktivist group Anonymous has published personal details of EDL members as part of a campaign against the group.

Much of its support came from individuals that the group called "armchair warriors", those who may not attend street protests but support the organisation and its aims online and campaigning by email, letter writing, and telephoning. Researchers found many individuals in white working-class areas who supported the EDL's views but did not want to attend its demonstrations, fearing violence, arrest, and the potential loss of their jobs. Many supportive women saw the demonstrations as a "man's thing", while various older men explained their non-attendance by characterising these events as a "young man's thing". Some female members also expressed frustration with the laddish culture that dominated the movement; one female member, whose father and partner were also members, complained that it was mostly "coked up bald headed blokes running round the streets".

In July 2010, the EDL had 22,000 followers on Facebook; following the killing of Lee Rigby in 2013 this had reached 160,000, and as of February 2015, it had risen further to 184,000. As of January 2016, its Angels Division for women had over 17,000 likes, while that of its LGBT Division had 3,500 likes. Its Facebook following was smaller than that of its rival, Britain First; in 2015, when the EDL had 181,000 followers, Britain First had 816,000. Pilkington argued that the EDL's active membership, meaning those who attended its rallies and events, peaked between January and April 2010, when national demonstrations could accrue 2000 people, but by the end of that year this had declined to between 800 and 1000. By 2012, the group's national demonstrations were typically only attracting between 300 and 700 people.

Activists... are neither born, nor aggressively recruited, into the EDL. They are neither duped by a charismatic leader nor are they working-class anti-heroes. Their trajectories in and out of the movement are prosaic rather than heroic. Moreover, in contrast to the decisive entrances and exits into and from classic far right movements, activism in the EDL resembles rather a 'hokey kokey' in which activists repeatedly engage and 'step-back' as they marry the costs and consequences of participation with their wider lives.

— Ethnographer Hilary Pilkington on her fieldwork among the EDL grassroots

The EDL forged what Busher described as "seemingly unlikely alliances. Long-term football hooligans marched alongside people waving gay pride flags, and people who had until recently been part of the extreme right scene stood next to people holding Israel flags." The EDL brought together three main constituencies; football hooligans, longstanding far-right activists, and a range of socio-economically marginalised people, the majority of whom were young men. Copsey noted that "beyond their antagonism towards Islam, there is no ideology that binds this ragbag coalition together", and that the EDL was therefore always susceptible to fracture. The group initially drew much of its membership from established football violence networks but later gained recruits from established sectors of the far-right and from within the counter-jihad movement. However, when the group was at its peak only a minority of its supporters had established far-right links, and for the majority their membership of the EDL was the first time that they had been actively involved in a political group.

Involvement with the EDL could bring various problems for its members which would dissuade their ongoing involvement; this included financial costs, the loss of friends, potential police scrutiny, and the restrictions it placed on their time. Various members described having friendships and relationships with family members that ended because of their decision to join the EDL, while others concealed their involvement from their employer out of a fear that they would lose their job. Some expressed fears that social services would take their children into foster care if their EDL membership was known, or that they would be the target of violence from anti-fascists and Muslims.

Meadowcroft and Morrow suggested that the EDL overcame the collective action problem by offering its members "access to violent conflict, increased self-worth and group solidarity". They argued that for many working-class young men who have "little meaning or cause for pride" in their lives, membership of the EDL allows them to "reimagine" themselves as "heroic freedom fighters" battling to save their nation from its fundamental enemy, Islam, "thereby bolstering their sense of self-worth." In addition, they argued that EDL membership gave individuals a sense of group identity and community which they might otherwise be lacking, citing various examples of members who described their local division as being like a family. In various cases, EDL members grew closer to one another because they had lost many other groups outside the organisation as a result of their membership. Pilkington similarly observed members describing the EDL as being akin to family, although noted that they often qualified this by describing certain individuals in the movement as "clowns", "nutters", "pricks", "idiots", and "backstabbers", either because they were suspected of being police informants or had defected to other groups. She noted that a key source of tension within the group surrounded issues of romantic relationships, with various individuals accused of "shagging around" in the movement.

== Profile of members ==
[EDL members] spoke at length about the rise of political Islam and the ubiquitous terrorist threat. They spoke about the involvement of Muslim men in the sexual exploitation of vulnerable young white girls. They spoke about Sharia law and their unwillingness to yield a single additional yard on the field of cultural politics. And when they spoke about these things, they spoke in a forthright manner that reflected their desire to push past the cloying cultural sensitivities that have grown around the popular discussion of immigration, ethnic conflict and religious diversity.

— Simon Winlow, Steve Hall, and James Treadwell on their fieldwork among the EDL

The EDL describe their members as "ordinary, non-racist citizens of England... who have had enough of being treated as second class citizens to Jihadis in our own country". Studies found that the majority of EDL members were young, working-class, white men. A recurring joke among the EDL membership was that the group's female supporters were mostly involved so that they could find men to engage in sexual and romantic relationships with; accordingly, one female member was quoted as describing the EDL's female division as the "sticky knicker brigade".

On the basis of her ethnographic research among the EDL, Pilkington found that 74% of her respondents were under 35, in contrast to the older support base of the BNP and UKIP. 77% were male to only 23% female, although women could be found in several senior positions. 51% described themselves as being "White English", and 23% as "White British". Only 6% of those she interviewed had either completed or were studying for a higher education degree; 20% had never completed their secondary school-level education. 49% were unemployed, 20% were in either part-time or irregular employment, and only 11% were in full-time employment. 57% lived in social housing, in contrast to only 17.5% of the general population. She also found that EDL members had rarely been raised in "stable, strong and protective environments", that accounts of sexual abuse and violence in childhood were somewhat common, and that a number had been cared for by grandparents or in foster care because their own parents were unable to do so. She noted that very few regarded themselves as Christian, and most had an ambivalent view of Christianity. Pilkington also found that while all were critical of recent governments, none—barring the few neo-Nazis who attended EDL rallies but did not consider themselves members—desired a more authoritarian government, one-party state, or dictatorship.

Once they hit their rhetorical stride, it was common for activists to reach beyond complaints ostensibly focused on Islam and Muslims to a more general lament that ranged across themes including immigration, overcrowded social housing, benefit fraud and, in the months after the English riots of August 2011, the supposed links between 'black culture' and a decline in law and order. They would, however, repeatedly return to the core EDL themes, making clear that where they had strayed from those themes they were 'just my opinions'.

— Political scientist Joel Busher on his fieldwork among the EDL grassroots

In 2011, Bartlett and Littler surveyed 1,295 EDL Facebook supporters. At the time, 81% of the EDL's Facebook supporters were male, to 19% female; among those surveyed by Bartlett and Littler most were young, with only 28% being over the age of thirty, and only 30% had attended either college or university. Bartlett and Littler found that EDL supporters were disproportionately unemployed; among 16 to 24 year old EDL supporters, 28% were unemployed (to a national average of 20%), and among 25 to 64 year olds, 28% were unemployed (to a national average of 6%). The issue that was most important to those surveyed was immigration; 42% considered immigration as one of the two largest issues affecting England, while only 31% cited Islamic extremism. They also found 34% of them voted for the BNP, more than for any other party; 14% said they would vote UKIP and another 14% said they would vote for the Conservative Party. Only 9% said that they would vote Labour, and 3% Liberal Democrat. When asked to rank their three most important personal values, 36% said security, 34% said strong government, 30% said rule of law, and 26% said individual freedom. The surveyed EDL supporters also displayed significantly higher than average levels of distrust in the government, police, and judiciary; conversely, their levels of distrust of other institutions, such as political parties, the mainstream media, the army, trade unions, and the European Union were not significantly higher that those exhibited by the broader population.

Additional research was carried out by Matthew Goodwin, David Cutts, and Laurence Janta-Lupinski, who drew upon the data gathered by YouGov in an October 2012 survey. This included 82 people who described themselves as members or expressed an interest in joining, and 298 who agreed with the EDL's values but did not wish to join; Goodwin et al called the latter "sympathisers". Their research found that those who sympathised with the EDL tended to be "older men, have low education levels, are skilled workers, read right-wing tabloid newspapers and support right-wing parties at elections"; they also noted, however, that "they are not disproportionately more likely to be unemployed or live in social housing" that members of the population more broadly. In contrast, those more committed to the movement, who were either members or wanted to join, displayed "greater financial insecurity", being more likely than average to be unemployed or in part-time employment, and more likely than average to live in social housing, rely on state benefits, and have no educational qualifications. These members were found to be "extremely pessimistic about intergroup relationships, strongly xenophobic and considerably more likely than others to endorse the use of violence when defending their in-group from perceived threats". 8% of sympathisers and 9% of members stated that they voted for either UKIP or the BNP, a figure four times higher than in the broader YouGov sample; supporters of the Conservative Party were also found to be significantly more likely to sympathise with the EDL than non-Conservative voters.

=== Perceptions of victimhood ===
The most consistent and emotionally charged narrative of 'self' identified among respondents in this study is that of 'second-class citizen'. This narrative is rooted in a sense of profound injustice based on the perception, almost universally expressed among respondents, that the needs of others are privileged over their own. While the perceived beneficiaries of that injustice might be racialised (as 'immigrants', 'Muslims' or ethnic minorities), and it is claimed that they are afforded preferential treatment in terms of access to benefits, housing and jobs, the agent responsible for this injustice is understood to be a weak-willed or frightened government that panders to the demands of a minority for fear of being labelled racist.

— Ethnographer Hilary Pilkington on her fieldwork among the EDL grassroots

The political scientist Alexander Oaten argued that victimhood was "the central formulating point for the EDL's collective identity". Similarly, Pilkington found that "the most consistent and emotionally charged narrative of 'self'" among the EDL was that of the self as a "second-class citizen" in Britain. Every EDL member she encountered believed that the state prioritised the needs of others—especially immigrants and Muslims—over those of themselves. In their view, non-whiteness or ethnic minority status was a powerful tool, given special recognition in law, that could be used against the white British. Among the EDL, there was a widespread belief that the government gave preferential treatment to ethnic minorities when it came to welfare benefits, social housing, and employment. Various members cited personal experiences where they believed that this had been the case. They also saw this two-tiered system being reflected in the judicial system, comparing instances in which Muslims who burned poppies received more lenient sentences than white individuals who burned Qur'ans.

EDL members frequently referenced incidents of racist abuse, bullying, violence, and murder against white British people which they felt went under-reported or inappropriately punished. The most cited example was the 2004 murder of Kriss Donald, a racist attack committed by Pakistani men on a white teenager; EDL members thought the perpetrators received excessively lenient sentences and that the incident gained virtually no media attention compared to a white-perpetrated racist killing like that of Stephen Lawrence. They also saw this two-tiered system in their perception that ethnic minorities were encouraged to display their own cultural symbols while the white English were not, citing examples in which their display of St George's flag had been censured amid accusations of racism. They also highlighted reports, including personal accounts, of school authorities refusing to punish ethnic minority pupils who had bullied white English pupils.

Winlow, Hall, and Treadwell similarly found EDL supporters repeatedly claiming the existence of "a creeping prejudice against the white heterosexual working class", with said members regarding themselves as "victims of a new systemic cultural injustice". An analysis of posts to an EDL message board indicated that EDL supporters perceived themselves as victims and that their EDL mobilisation was a response to this victimisation. The EDL regularly used this feeling of victimhood and victimisation to construct a sense of collective identity within the movement and an image of its external enemies. Oaten suggested that the EDL had an "obsession with the cult of victimhood", and that this had been present in the movement since its beginnings.

=== Recurring views ===
Busher felt that most of the EDL members he encountered "had a highly binary interpretation of the world, seeing themselves as engaged in a millennial struggle between good and evil – an existential fight for the future of their country and culture." He noted that most activists rarely or never presented this struggle in terms of biological race, even in contexts where they expressed anti-foreigner and anti-migrant sentiments. Both Busher and Pilkington encountered EDL members who came to the group from other sectors of the far-right and who claimed their views moderated as a result; one London activist for instance stated that through his EDL membership he overcame his previous dislike of black people. Busher suggested that this might be because the EDL ideology's shifted some individual's hostility from being directed at non-white Britons broadly toward Muslims specifically. At the same time, he noted that as the EDL fragmented, members of some of its splinter groups adopted increasingly extreme white power views.

Braouezec's interviews with EDL supporters found many frustrated with being labelled "far-right"; Pilkington found the same phenomenon, noting that distinguishing oneself from the traditional far-right was "central to definitions of 'self' for EDL members." Even in private, many members did not identify as being either "far-right", or "racist". On the EDL message board studied by Cleland, Anderson, and Aldridge-Deacon, EDL members expressed frustration at how non-Muslims were portrayed in the media; one thread for instance included members criticising The Guardian newspaper after an EDL supporter's post to their online comment section was removed. On this message board, EDL supporters also spoke regularly about a forthcoming civil war in Britain between Muslims and non-Muslims.

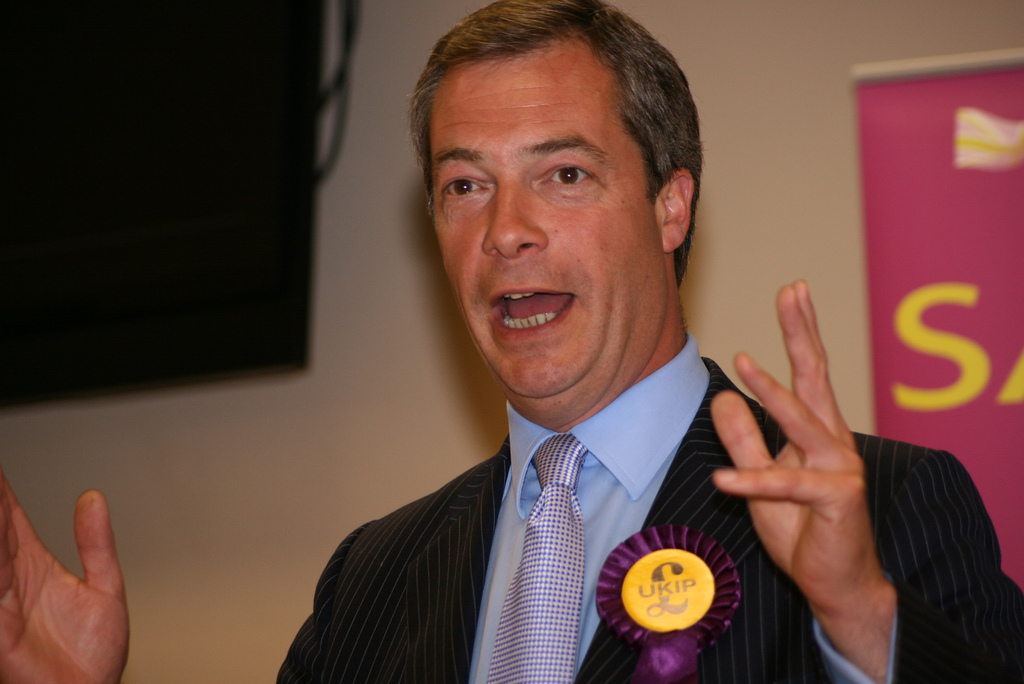
Winlow, Hall, and Treadwell found that most of their EDL contacts were intending to vote for UKIP, a right-wing populist party led by Nigel Farage (pictured) in the build-up to the 2015 general election.

Winlow, Hall, and Treadwell noted that members placed great importance on their working-class identity and class interests, and that many displayed clear bonds with their local communities. Noting that EDL members expressed a "crude, forthright and hostile worldview", they also opined that "inarticulate anger" was the "basic emotion" that typified "the EDL's cultural and political life". Their EDL contacts all expressed hatred for Muslims, and even more so for mainstream politicians. Winlow, Hall, and Treadwell believed that EDL supporters ultimately desired to live in a "mythical perfect world... in which they felt immediately at home and in which everything made sense", a world with a strong community, security, and order, where they had satisfying and well-paid employment, and felt listened to and represented in the political sphere.

Many cited coming from families who were Labour voters and sometimes trade unionists, but also expressed anger at Labour, regarding it as the party of multiculturalism, political correctness, mass immigration, and do-goodery. Among EDL members, there was much talk of "stupid lefties" who were believed to hate the white working class. One EDL supporter in his early twenties was quoted as saying: "I fucking hate those who oppose us, the fucking UAF and the fucking cultural Marxists. They are just queers, dirty spoilt whores who like ethnic cock, and middle-class pricks that don't know what life is really like when you live on a shitty fucking estate where everything is disappearing except the fucking foreign faces." Winlow, Hall, and Treadwell observed that in the build-up to the 2015 general election, most of their EDL contacts intended to vote UKIP.

=== Shifting class allegiances ===
Winlow, Hall, and Treadwell also engaged in fieldwork among EDL members, noting that it "draws the overwhelming majority of its support from Britain's old white working class". They argued that many white working-class Britons—who had predominantly aligned with the political left during the twentieth century—had shifted to the far-right in the early twenty-first century because mainstream left-wing politicians had increasingly abandoned them. After Tony Blair's New Labour project took control of the Labour Party in the 1990s, it increasingly shifted away from its traditional working-class base and focused attention on middle-class swing voters. As well as no longer seeing the white working-classes as a viable electoral constituency—Winlow, Hall, and Treadwell argued—middle-class leftist politicians also increasingly regarded its cultural attitudes and values as an embarrassment. At the same time, in the years following the dissolution of the Soviet Union in 1991, the mainstream British left ceased talking about regulating capitalism and there had been a narrowing in economic policy between Labour and the Conservatives. As a result, Winlow, Hall and Treadwell found that few of the EDL members they contacted were aware that the British left had historically dedicated itself to improving the economic prospects of the working class.

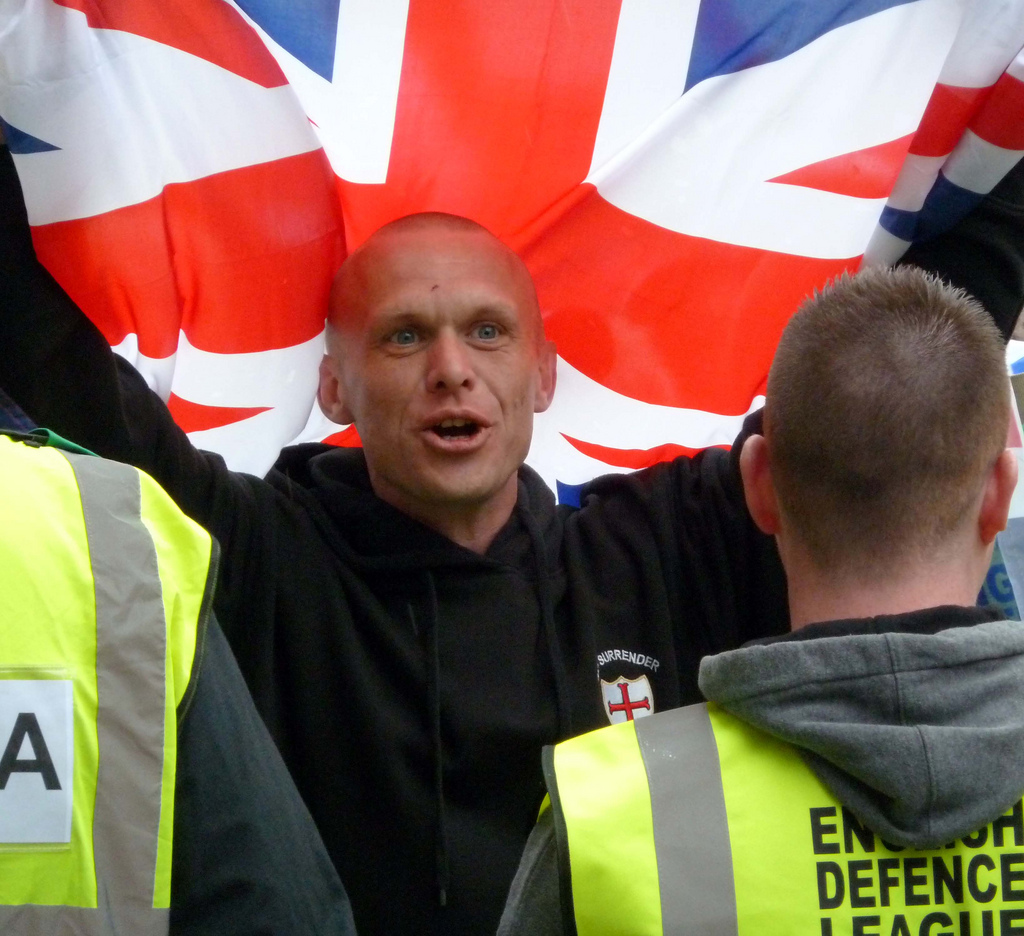
A participant in an EDL rally in Newcastle

While the white working classes felt increasingly rejected by the mainstream left, they also perceived it as expressing very visible support for cultural minorities. EDL supporters expressed the view that mainstream politicians of both the centre-left and centre-right had been "seduced by the image of 'the exotic'", wanting to "embrace 'diversity' and cultural novelty" while presenting themselves as "cutting-edge, forward-looking, open, cosmopolitan and progressive". To this end—EDL supporters believed—mainstream politicians had encouraged immigration and multiculturalism while coming to loathe white working-class culture, pushing it "from the centre of English society and culture to the margins." They believed that public policy increasingly favoured minorities—whether they be LGBT people, ethnic minorities, or religious minorities—by using affirmative action employment, drives to "diversify" workforces, or favourable media coverage, and that the state had encouraged these groups to present themselves as victims. EDL supporters believed that the heterosexual white working class were left as the only cultural group in the UK that lacked vocal political representation.

At the same time, economic shifts had seen traditional working-class jobs increasingly replaced by low-grade service sector jobs, which were non-unionised and often part-time, for instance on zero hour contracts; EDL members were aware of this economic shift, believing that their parents and grandparents' generations had had a better quality of life. According to Winlow, Hall and Treadwell, it was the resulting "background of broadly felt anger and frustration" among the white working class, a "sense of disempowerment, abandonment and growing irrelevance", from which the EDL was able to develop. The EDL provided these working-class individuals with "a very basic means of understanding their frustrations", pointing the finger of blame for their economic insecurity and sense of cultural marginalisation at Muslims and recently arrived migrants. At the same time, Winlow, Hall and Treadwell added that the EDL's identification of Islam as the source of white working-class problems "cannot be justified. At least not rationally." They finished their study by cautioning that unless the left succeeded in reattaching itself to the white working-class—and in doing so ceasing to become "lost in identity politics and dominated by right-on metropolitan liberals" who did nothing to improve the economic life of working-class people—then the UK would enter a period dominated by the political right.
