= David Painter (priest) =

English clergyman

The Ven. David Scott Painter was Archdeacon of Oakham from 2000 to 2011.

Born on 3 October 1944 he was educated at Queen Elizabeth's Grammar School, Crediton, Trinity College of Music and Worcester College, Oxford. He was ordained in 1971 and began his career as a curate at St Andrew, Plymouth and Anglican chaplain at Plymouth Polytechnic. His next curacy was All Saints, St Marylebone after which he was Domestic Chaplain to the Archbishop of Canterbury. From 1980 to 1991 he was Vicar of Holy Trinity, Roehampton and then Rural Dean of Wandsworth. He became an Archdeacon in 2000, at which time he was also appointed a Canon Residentiary of Peterborough Cathedral.

He retired in 2011.

== Notes ==
Church of England titles
Preceded by Bernard Fernyhough	Archdeacon of Oakham; 2000–2011	Succeeded by Gordon John Steele
