= Church of St Peter and St Paul, Uppingham =

Church in Rutland, England

Coordinates: 52°35′14.3″N 00°43′19.75″W

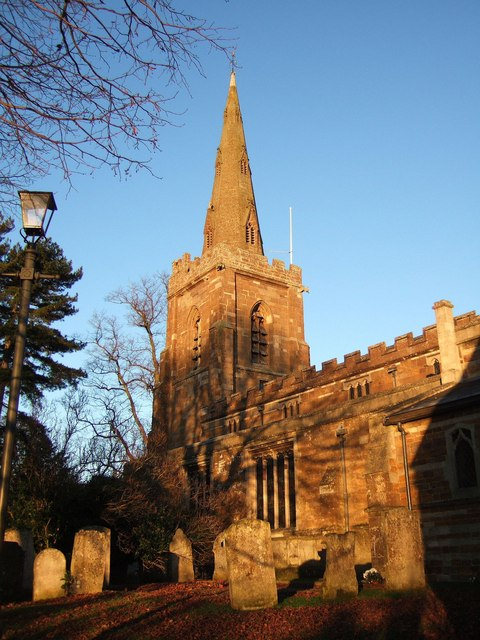
- Church of St Peter and St Paul, Uppingham: glowing in the early morning winter sun, the church is seen from the southeast corner of the churchyard
- Church of St Peter and St Paul, Uppingham
- Denomination: Church of England
- Churchmanship: Broad Church
- Website: www.uppinghamchurch.co.uk

History
- Dedication: St Peter and St Paul

Administration
- Province: Canterbury
- Diocese: Peterborough
- Parish: Uppingham

The Church of St Peter and St Paul, Uppingham is the Church of England parish church of Uppingham, Rutland. It is part of the Diocese of Peterborough.

== History ==
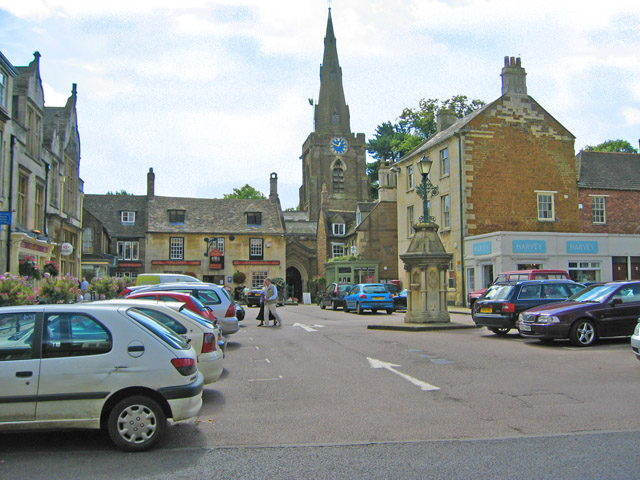
Market Place, Uppingham with the church porch

The church is a Grade II* listed building. It is largely 14th century but was heavily restored in 1861 by Henry Parsons.

It consists of a western tower, nave with north and south aisles and clerestory, chancel and north chapel, organ chamber and vestry, and north and south porches. The tower is of three stages with angle buttresses and has a tall recessed spire with three tiers of lucarnes. The nave is of four bays and was lengthened by one bay in the 1861 restoration. The north aisle is from the Decorated period, the south aisle is Perpendicular. There are remnants of wall decoration on the south arcade consisting of red flowers and tendrils.

The chancel was rebuilt in 1861, incorporating black marble columns to the north chapel (Lady Chapel) and organ chamber. During the reconstruction some sculptured fragments of the twelfth century were found, two of which are now built into the wall on either side of the north door. A coffin lid of the thirteenth century was also found.

The font of 1863 was designed by George Edmund Street for All Saints', Cottesbrooke, Northamptonshire.

== Rectors ==
- Edmund Bonner 1528–1541
- Edward Martin 1631–1637
- Jeremy Taylor 1638–1643
- Edward Jones 1786–1814
- George Hutchinson 1815–1817
- John Giles Dimock 1817–1858
- William Wales 1859–1879
- C. A. Yate 1879–1880
- Prideaux Lightfoot 1880–1906
- Edward Moore (Archdeacon of Oakham) 1907–1920
- John Ivan Willett 1982–1999
- Stephen Evans 2000–2010
- Rachel Watts 2011–current

== Bells ==
The tower has a ring of eight bells.

- Treble 1773 Pack and Chapman of London
- Second 1773 Pack and Chapman of London
- Third 1772 Pack and Chapman of London
- Fourth 1804 Robert Taylor of St Neots
- Fifth 1895 John Taylor & Co of Loughborough
- Sixth 1772 Pack and Chapman of London
- Seventh 1772 Pack and Chapman of London
- Tenor 1772 Pack and Chapman of London

== Organ ==
The organ case was obtained from St Mary's Church, Nottingham in 1777 and is by Thomas Swarbrick dating from 1742. The organ itself is by Harrison and Harrison, built in 1894 and installed in 2006 by Peter Collins when it became redundant from All Saints', Eppleton, County Durham. A specification of the organ can be found on the National Pipe Organ Register.
