= Prideaux Lightfoot =

Reginald Prideaux Lightfoot (26 May 1836 – 18 September 1906) was a British Anglican priest. He was the Archdeacon of Oakham in the Church of England from 1880 to 1905.

== Life ==
Lightfoot was born into an ecclesiastical family — his father, John Prideaux Lightfoot, was the Rector of Exeter College, Oxford. He was educated at Radley College and Balliol College, Oxford. He was Vicar of Wellingborough then Rector of Church of St Peter and St Paul, Uppingham from 1890 until his death. He was the Archdeacon of Oakham from 1880 to 1905, and served as Prolocutor of the Lower House of Convocation of the Province of Canterbury from February 1900.

He received the degree Doctor of Divinity (DD) from the University of Oxford in March 1900.

== Family ==
Lightfoot married in 1869 Alice Gordon Robbins, eldest daughter of George Robbins, rector of Courtenhall. Robert Henry Lightfoot was their son.

Church of England titles
Preceded by Lord Alwyne Compton	Archdeacon of Oakham; 1880–1906	Succeeded by Edward Moore
