= Frank Towndrow =

Frank Noel Towndrow QHC (25 December 1911 – 7 April 2007) was a Church of England priest who was Archdeacon of Oakham from 1967 to 1977.

== Early life ==
Towndrow was born on Christmas Day 1911. He was educated at St Olave's Grammar School, then an all-boys grammar school in Orpington, Kent. He went on to study at King's College, Cambridge.

== Ecclesiastical career ==
Towndrow was ordained after a period of study at The College of the Resurrection, Mirfield in 1937 and began his career with a curacy in Chingford.

He saw active service during World War II. On 19 February 1940, he was commissioned into the Chaplains Branch of the Royal Air Force Volunteer Reserve (RAFVR). He was granted the relative rank of squadron leader. He relinquished his commission on 25 December 1956.

When peace returned he held incumbencies at Grangemouth, Kirton Lindsey, Greenford Magna and Ravensthorpe.

During his years as an Archdeacon he was also a Canon Residentiary of Peterborough Cathedral and an Honorary Chaplain to the Queen

== Death and memorial ==
He died on 7 April 2007. There is a ledger slab in his memory at Peterborough Cathedral.

== Notes ==
Church of England titles
Preceded by Ernest Norman Millard	Archdeacon of Oakham; 1967–1977	Succeeded by Bernard Fernyhough
