= Ravensthorpe, Peterborough =

Residential area of Peterborough, England

Coordinates: 52°35′35″N 0°16′26″W

Ravensthorpe is a residential area and electoral ward of the city of Peterborough, in the ceremonial county of Cambridgeshire, England.

Ravensthorpe County Primary School is located in the area with secondary pupils usually attending nearby Jack Hunt School in Netherton.

Ravensthorpe was mainly built as a part of north-west Bretton in the 1960s. It was built primarily as council housing and cheap family residencies during Peterborough's extensive growth during the 1970s and 1980s.
