= Norman Millard =

Anglican archdeacon (1899–1969)

The Venerable Ernest Norman Millard was Archdeacon of Oakham from 1946 to 1966.

Born on 20 September 1899, he was educated at the City of London School and Worcester College, Oxford. He was ordained after a period of study at Ripon College Cuddesdonin 1925 and began his career with a curacy in Rugby. He held incumbencies at St James, Northampton and St Mark's, Portsea, Portsmouth before his years as an Archdeacon, during which he was also a Canon Residentiary of Peterborough Cathedral.

He died on 7 March 1969.

== Notes ==
Church of England titles
Preceded by Norman MacLeod Lang	Archdeacon of Oakham; 1946–1966	Succeeded by Frank Noel Towndrow
