= Thomas Swarbrick =

English pipe organ builder

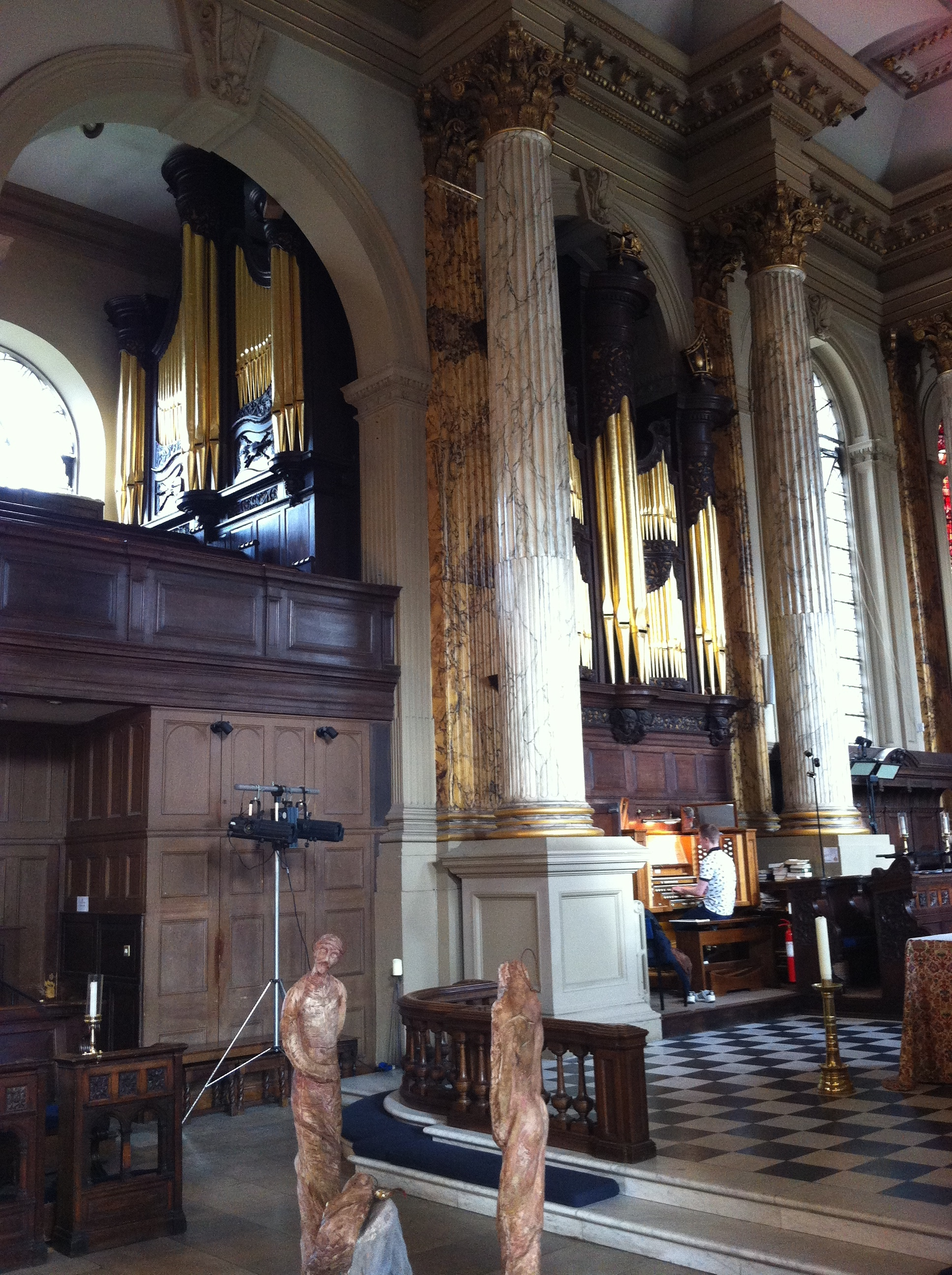
Organ case in St Philip's Cathedral, Birmingham, by Thomas Swarbrick in 1715

Thomas Swarbrick (sometimes Schwarbrook; c. 1675 – c. 1753) was an organ builder active in England in the eighteenth century.

== History ==
He learned his trade as an apprentice of the famous builder Renatus Harris. He appeared to be working on his own by 1706, when he rebuilt an organ in St Alphege’s Church, Greenwich.

His most famous organ is that in St Michael’s Church, Coventry of 1733.

His nephew, Henry Swarbrick, was organist of Hereford Cathedral from 1720 to 1754.

== Works ==
- 1703: St Saviour's Church, Southwark
- 1705: All Saints' Church, Northampton
- 1706: St Alphege’s Church, Greenwich
- 1710: Residence of Other Windsor, 2nd Earl of Plymouth, Bromsgrove
- 1713: St Nicholas' Church, Bristol
- 1714: St Michael's Church, Minehead
- 1715: St Philip's Church, Birmingham
- 1716: St Chad's Church, Shrewsbury
- 1717: St Mary’s Collegiate Church, Warwick
- 1718: St Cuthbert's Church, Wells
- 1719: Vicar's Hall, Wells
- 1723: St Mary Magdalene's Church, Launceston
- 1725: St Martin's Church, Birmingham (transferred to St. Alphege's Church, Solihull)
- 1731: Holy Trinity Church, Stratford upon Avon
- 1732: Southwell Minster
- 1733: St Michael's Church, Coventry
- 1735: Lincoln Cathedral (repairs)
- 1736: Magdalen College, Oxford
- 1737: St Nicholas Church, Stanford on Avon
- 1739: St Thomas' Church, Salisbury
- 1740: Lichfield Cathedral
- 1742: St Mary's Church, Nottingham (case now in Church of St Peter and St Paul, Uppingham)
- 1744: Christ Church, Bristol
- 1744: Church of St Peter and St Paul, Shepton Mallet
- 1752: Worcester Cathedral (repairs)
