= Edward Moore (Archdeacon of Oakham) =

Edward Marsham Moore (17 January 1844 – 5 September 1921) was a British Anglican priest. He was the Archdeacon of Oakham in the Church of England from 1906 to 1918.

Moore was educated at Christ Church, Oxford and Ripon College Cuddesdon and ordained in 1867. He was curate of (1867–1872) then Vicar of (1872–1876) Ashborne after which he was Rector of Benefield (1876–1907) and, finally, the Church of St Peter and St Paul, Uppingham (1907–1920).

He was the son of Edward Moore (12 June 1813 – 20 April 1889), formerly Rector of Frittenden, Kent, and of Rt Hon Lady Harriet Jane Sarah Montagu-Scott, daughter of Charles Montagu-Scott, 4th Duke of Buccleuch. He was the elder brother of Admiral Sir Arthur Moore and great-grandson of John Moore (Archbishop of Canterbury)

Moore married (1878) Lucy Watts-Russell and there were three children: Aubrey Edward Duncombe Moore (1879–1946), Captain RN; Constance Evelyn Harriet Moore (1886–1966); and Noel Arthur Moore (1890–1966), British Army Captain. He died suddenly in 1921 in Maidstone of heart failure.

Church of England titles
Preceded by Reginald Prideaux Lightfoot	Archdeacon of Oakham; 1906–1918	Succeeded by Walter Godfrey Whittingham
