= Jack Hunt School =

Jack Hunt School (Foundation)

Location
- Ledbury Road, Netherton, Peterborough, Cambridgeshire, PE3 9PN; England; 52.577933°N 0.276697°W

Information
- Type: Academy
- Founded: 1969
- Local authority: Peterborough
- Specialist: Language/Sports
- Department for Education URN: 145271 Tables
- Ofsted: Reports
- Head teacher: Jon Hebbelthwaite
- Gender: Co-educational
- Age: 11 to 18
- Enrolment: 1878 (2025)
- Capacity: 1950
- Website: https://www.jackhunt.net

Jack Hunt School, officially Jack Hunt School Language College, is a co-educational secondary school and sixth form located in Netherton in the city of Peterborough in the United Kingdom. Students are aged 11 (Year 7) to 18 (Year 13). Refurbishment of the premises, as part of the Peterborough Secondary School Review, increased the capacity by one form of entry in each year group, with a similar increase in the sixth form, amounting to around an extra 175 places.

Religion In Jack Hunt School According To A School Survey Conducted In April 2026
1. Islam (42.0%)
2. Christianity (39.0%)
3. No religion (15.0%)
4. Hinduism (2.80%)
5. Other (1.20%)

== History ==
The school was founded in 1969, initially admitting children aged 11–16. In 1975, the school added a sixth form.

The school was officially opened by Jack Hunt, chairman of the Education Committee of the then Huntingdon and Peterborough County Council, after whom it is named. Briefly, until education in the county was reorganised in 1976, it functioned as a secondary modern school

Jack Hunt School became a Beacon school in September 1999 for an initial period of three years. Following a successful application to the then Department for Education and Skills, Beacon status was granted for a further three years with effect from September 2002. In 2003, the school was reopened as a specialist Language College by John Simpson CBE. In 2004, Beacon schools came to an end nationally and Jack Hunt successfully applied to become a new Leading Edge School.

In September 2001 racial tensions escalated at the school following the racist murder of former pupil Ross Parker in the city shortly after the September 11th Attacks. Three Asian pupils were suspended in October 2001 following an attack on another pupil but the school and headmaster Chris Hilliard were later praised in Parliament for the way they managed to overcome such problems.

On 16 January 2012, the school received a hoax call stating that a bomb had been planted on the premises. Subsequently the entire school had to be evacuated. The pupils were left outside for hours, leading to numerous complaints from parents. In response, and as a token of apology, the head purchased a doughnut for every pupil.

On 6 February 2025, the school received another hoax email stating a bomb had been planted on the schools premises though it was soon proven to be false and nobody had to be evacuated

Previously a foundation school administered by Peterborough City Council, in April 2018 Jack Hunt School converted to academy status. The school is now sponsored by Peterborough Keys Academies Trust. It is notably the only secondary school in that is a part of the Peterborough Keys Academies Trust (PKAT)

== Demographics ==
As of 2025, there were 1878 pupils in the school and 32.7% of them were eligible for free school meals.

72% of the students are from ethnic minority backgrounds, mostly being Urdu speakers of Pakistani origin. 65% of students speak a first language other than English and 70 different languages are spoken in the school.

== Facilities ==
Jack Hunt Pool is an 82 feet (25 m) dual-use facility, built on the premises but open to the general public. Jack Hunt is also home to Peterborough's Yamaha School. The school offers Keyboard, Guitar and Drumming to the community.

In 2019 Jack Hunt opened a new block (referred to internally as block 5) with a new dining facility, new classrooms and an all-weather astro turf football pitch.

== Notable former pupils ==
- Fatima Manji, a reporter, Channel 4 News
- Aston Merrygold: member of boy band JLS.
- Keith Palmer: better known as Maxim, MC with dance act The Prodigy.
- James Fox, Paralympic rower. Part of team that won gold at the 2017 Paralympic Games.
- Kirsty Bowden, GB and England hockey player, Olympian and Commonwealth Games medallist.
- Richard V Reeves, British American writer and scholar and a Senior Fellow at the Brookings Institution.
