= Archdeacon of Oakham =

Church of England ecclesiastical office

The Archdeacon of Oakham is a senior ecclesiastical officer within the Anglican Diocese of Peterborough. As such, they are responsible for the disciplinary supervision of the clergy within its six rural deaneries: Corby, Higham, Kettering, Oundle, Peterborough and Rutland.

The archdeaconry was created by splitting the Archdeaconry of Northampton on 29 June 1875; the archdeaconry has remained part of Peterborough diocese since its creation.

== List of archdeacons ==
- 1875–1879 (res.): Lord Alwyne Compton (became Dean of Worcester)
- 1880–18 September 1906 (d.): Prideaux Lightfoot
- 1906–1918 (res.): Edward Moore
- 1918–1923 (res.): Walter Whittingham (became Bishop of St Edmundsbury and Ipswich)
- 1924–1934 (res.): Arthur Greaves (became Sub-Dean of Lincoln)
- 1934–1936 (res.): Frank Partridge (became Bishop of Portsmouth)
- 1936–1945 (ret.): Norman Lang, Assistant Bishop of Peterborough
- 1946–1966 (ret.): Norman Millard (afterwards archdeacon emeritus)
- 1967–1977 (ret.): Frank Towndrow (afterwards archdeacon emeritus)
- 1977–1999 (ret.): Bernard Fernyhough (afterwards archdeacon emeritus)
- 2000–2011 (ret.): David Painter (afterwards archdeacon emeritus)
- 25 February 2012 – 30 November 2021 (ret.): Gordon Steele (afterwards archdeacon emeritus)
- 6 February 2022 present: Alison Booker
