= Gordon Steele (priest) =

Retired Anglican priest

Gordon John Steele (born 1955) is a retired Anglican priest who served as Archdeacon of Oakham, 2012–2021.

Born in 1955 he was educated at the University of Kent, Worcester College, Oxford and the College of the Resurrection. He was ordained in 1985 and after a curacy at Greenhill (Harrow) he became Vicar of St Andrew's Uxbridge (1988–1994). In 1994 he was appointed an Honorary Canon of Peterborough Cathedral and Vicar of St Alban's, Northampton. He was Vicar of St John the Baptist Church, Peterborough from 2001–2012 where he oversaw a £280,000 development project and collaborated with the regeneration of the city centre. He was Rural Dean of Peterborough from 2004 to 2010.

Steele retired effective 30 November 2021 and was awarded the honorific title of archdeacon emeritus.

Church of England titles
Preceded by David Painter	Archdeacon of Oakham; 2012–2021	TBA
