= Murder of Ross Parker =

2001 murder of an English teenager

Ross Parker
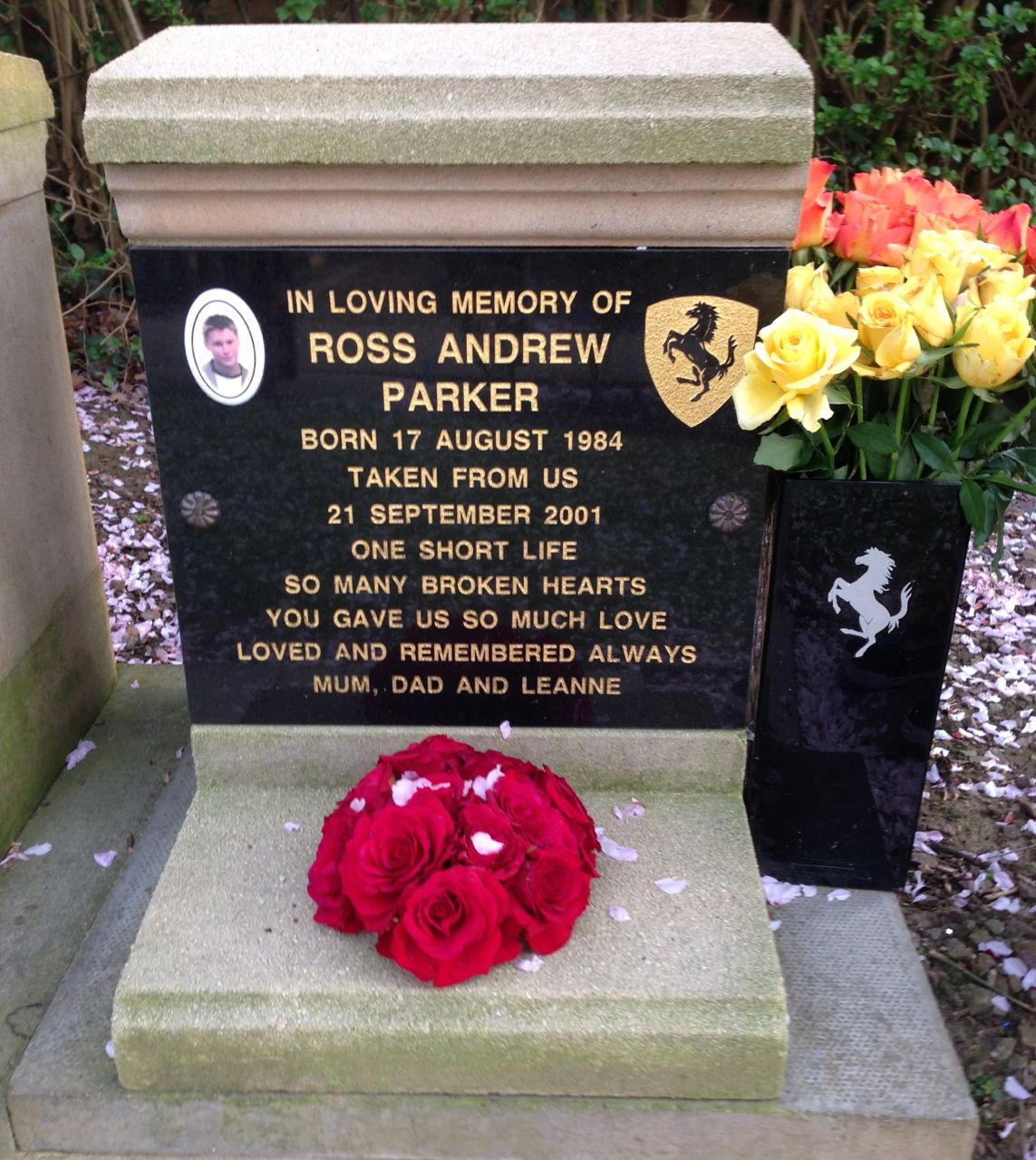
- Commemorative plaque for Parker at Peterborough Crematorium
- Born: Ross Andrew Parker; 17 August 1984; Peterborough, Cambridgeshire, England
- Died: 21 September 2001 (aged 17); Millfield, Peterborough, Cambridgeshire, England
- Cause of death: Stabbing
- Resting place: Peterborough Crematorium, Marholm, Peterborough; 52.60471°N 0.2898°W
- Occupation: Bar worker
- Employer: The Solstice Pub
- Height: 5 ft 5 in (165 cm)
- Partner: Nicola Toms (now Foot)
- Parent(s): Davinia and Tony Parker

Ahmed Ali Awan
- Born: c. 1980 (age 45–46)
- Occupation: Labour contractor
- Status: In prison
- Conviction: Murder (19 December 2002)
- Criminal charge: Murder
- Penalty: Life imprisonment (minimum 18 years)

Details
- Date apprehended: 22 September 2001

Shaied Nazir
- Born: c. 1980 (age 45–46)
- Other name: Biggy
- Occupation: Door-to-door salesman
- Status: In prison
- Conviction: Murder (19 December 2002)
- Criminal charge: Murder
- Penalty: Life imprisonment (minimum 16 years)

Details
- Date apprehended: 22 September 2001

Sarfraz Ali
- Born: c. 1977 (age 48–49)
- Occupation: Delivery driver
- Status: released (2020)
- Conviction: Murder (19 December 2002)
- Criminal charge: Murder
- Penalty: Life imprisonment (minimum 16 years)

Details
- Date apprehended: c. 24 September 2001

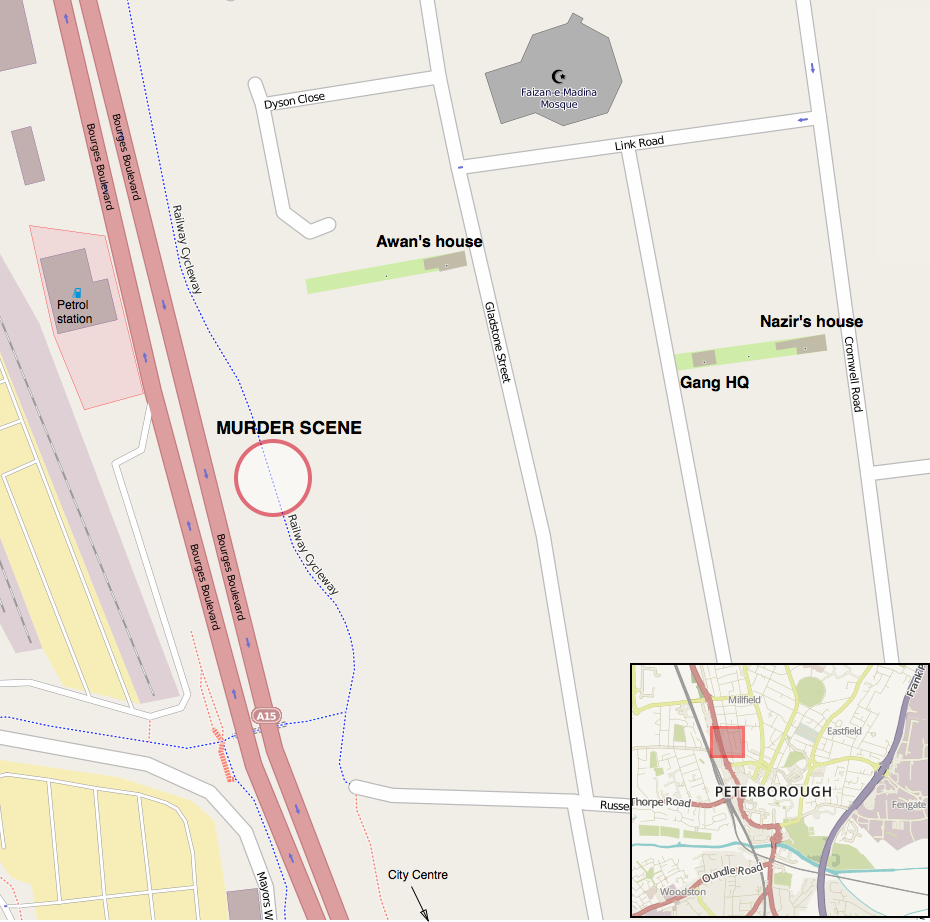
Map showing the location of the murder scene and other relevant sites

Ross Andrew Parker (17 August 1984 – 21 September 2001), from Peterborough, England, was a seventeen-year-old white English male murdered in an unprovoked racially motivated crime. He bled to death after being stabbed, beaten with a hammer and repeatedly kicked by a gang of British Pakistani men. The incident occurred in Millfield, Peterborough, ten days after the September 11 attacks.

In December 2002, Shaied Nazir, Ahmed Ali Awan and Sarfraz Ali were unanimously found guilty of Parker's murder and sentenced to life imprisonment, each receiving minimum terms ranging from 16 to 18 years. A fourth defendant, Zairaff Mahrad, was cleared of murder and manslaughter.

A memorial plaque for Parker is located in the Netherton area of Peterborough where a football match is played each year in his memory.

== Background ==
Ross Parker was born in 1984 to Davinia and Tony Parker. Parker was an avid footballer and, having completed a GNVQ in business studies at Jack Hunt School, hoped to join the police force when he was 18. He was nicknamed "Half-Pint" owing to his 5-foot-5-inch (1.65 m) height and had twice broken his leg. Parker lived in the Westwood area of the city and worked part-time as bar support at The Solstice, a local public house where he had met his girlfriend, Nicola Toms.

== Murder ==
Parker was murdered shortly after 1:15 a.m. on Friday 21 September 2001 while walking with his girlfriend, Nicola Toms. The attack took place on a cycle path alongside Bourges Boulevard in Millfield, Peterborough, near to Russell Street. Racial tensions in the area were high as the 11 September attacks in New York City had occurred only ten days earlier.

Having finished work early, Parker and Toms were walking to visit her friend's house when they were confronted by a gang of around ten British Pakistani youths, some of whom were wearing balaclavas; the 2002 trial judge concluded that they had planned to find "a white male to attack simply because he was white" in the context of "hostility on the part of some of the younger white residents of the city against the Asian community". They warned Parker he had "better start running", but then blocked his path and quickly sprayed him in the face with CS gas. He was punched in the stomach then stabbed three times from behind through the throat and chest with a foot-long hunting knife. The knife penetrated completely through his body on two occasions and as he was lying on the ground he was repeatedly kicked and struck with a panel beater's hammer.

Toms ran to a nearby petrol station for help and a man there gave her his mobile phone to call the police. While making the call, she twice heard Parker cry out in pain. By chance she spotted a passing police car. She entered the car and guided the officer to the scene of the assault. Although Toms had only been away for a few minutes, by the time she returned Parker had already bled to death and the gang had disappeared.

After the murder, four of the gang returned to a garage which they used as their headquarters. Ahmed Ali Awan, brandishing the bloodied knife, exclaimed "cherish the blood". The police informed Parker's family of his death at 4:30 a.m.; his body remained at the scene during the day while an investigation was conducted. A post-mortem revealed Parker had died as a result of stab wounds inflicted by a bladed instrument.

== Arrests and charges ==
Parker's murder sparked what became one of the biggest police inquiries in the history of Peterborough. During the weekend following the attack, twelve suspects of Pakistani descent were arrested on suspicion of murder. Members of the local Muslim community posted a £1,000 reward for information leading to the arrest of the killers, later increasing to £1,500. Detective Chief Inspector Dick Harrison, who was overseeing the case, praised the city's Muslim community for their involvement in capturing the murderers.

On 26 September 2001, Sarfraz Ali, Ahmed Ali Awan and Shaied Nazir appeared in court charged with Parker's murder. Zairaff Mahrad was charged the following day. However, by March 2002 all four defendants had been controversially released on bail. Parker's sister, Leanne, stated "we can't begin to comprehend why they've been allowed out of prison at this stage". Parker's family were so concerned about the decision that they wrote a letter of complaint to the Home Secretary, David Blunkett. The Home Office refused to comment on the case and the men remained free on bail.

== Trial ==
On 7 November 2002, Awan, Nazir, Ali and Mahrad all of Millfield, Peterborough, stood trial for Parker's murder at Northampton Crown Court, pleading not guilty.

Awan, 22, ran a recruitment company and had previously attended the city's Deacon's School. He was an unofficial police informer and the court was told he thought of himself as a gangster and had a "fantasy for knives". Nazir, 22, was close friends with Awan. He was married in Kashmir the month prior to the murder and had a son. He was educated at Bretton Woods School, had worked in a factory and later in a takeaway restaurant with Mahrad, whom he had known since childhood. Ali, 25, had also attended Bretton Woods School and was also married, although his wife left him during the trial. He was given a reference at the trial by the Conservative Deputy Mayor of Peterborough, Raja Akhtar, and Labour Party councillor Mohammed Choudhary, with Akhtar stating he had "known him to be caring and responsible". Mahrad, 21, owned a takeaway restaurant business in King's Lynn.

During the six-week trial, transcripts of covert police recordings of the suspects discussing the attack were submitted as evidence. These conversations took place in police vehicles when the suspects were arrested and were translated from Punjabi. Nazir was heard describing Parker's death as a "bloodbath", and how the third blow from the knife had split the whole of his neck open. Awan and Nazir were both heard discussing the statements they had given to police and the plan they had "made up". The court was also told of an exchange between Awan and an inmate at Bedford Prison, in which Awan described the killing of Parker in lurid detail. Contents of a letter written by Mahrad were also presented in which he stated he would "pray to Allah for forgiveness".

The jury heard how the murder weapons had been found in a shed at Nazir's house along with two bags of bloodied clothes. DNA and fingerprints belonging to Nazir were found on the hunting knife and Parker's blood was found on both the hammer and knife. His blood was also found on the clothes of two of the accused, along with Nazir and Mahrad's DNA, and a pathologist told how marks on Parker's body matched the hammer found in Nazir's shed. Three balaclavas were also recovered from the property, again containing traces of Parker's blood. Nazir's younger brother Wyed told the court he had seen his brother cleaning the murder weapon on the night of the killing and witnessed all four defendants with blood on their clothing. Further witnesses reported Nazir admitting to beating someone up, Mahrad admitting to kicking Parker and Awan recalling stabbing him. A witness also saw all four defendants kicking Parker.

In court Nazir admitted to seeing the victim lying on the ground and attempting to spray him with CS gas and kicking him. He also acknowledged washing the murder weapon and stated Ali had hit Parker with the hammer and Awan used the knife. Nazir also alleged prosecution witnesses Zaheer Abbas and Adeel Rehman had been involved in the attack too. Mahrad had also admitted to being present at the murder scene, and claimed that the blood stains found on his trousers occurred as a result of his accidentally falling across Parker. Ali, defended by Mohammed Latif, denied being at the scene and claimed to have been asleep at the time of the murder, although a recording from a police van indicated this was a "story" that he had encouraged the others to "stick to". Awan also denied being present and claimed he had been at home playing on his PlayStation with Shokat Awan, his brother.

Nigel Rumfitt QC, defending Awan, summarised the crime by stating: "These people were not taking the night air. Every member of the group knew what was going on. These weapons had been selected before they set off. The knife was far too big to be hidden from the others. There is no doubt there was a hunting party looking for a victim."

On 19 December 2002, Nazir, Awan and Ali were all found guilty of murder in unanimous verdicts. The judge, Sir Edwin Jowitt, summarised the murder during sentencing:

You put your heads together with the purpose of arming yourselves and of attacking an innocent man you might find by chance simply because he was of a different race to yourselves. A racist killing must be one of the gravest kinds of killing.

The judge concluded that Awan had wielded the knife, was the ringleader of the group and had intended to kill. The three received life sentences, with Awan to serve a minimum of 18 years and the others at least 16. Mahrad was cleared of murder and manslaughter.

== Post-trial and appeals ==
After the trial it was revealed that Nazir had previously been cautioned for threatening behaviour in 1999 and fined for resisting arrest. The two politicians, Akhtar and Choudhary, who provided Ali's references were later jailed themselves for forgery in relation to vote rigging.

Awan and Nazir appealed against their jail terms in January 2008 but the original sentences were upheld. Judge Justice Davis said he had taken into account "moving" statements from Parker's family. Ali appealed his sentence in July 2009 and also had his sentence upheld. After the first two appeals, Parker's father suggested that the killers of his son should never be freed. Justice Davis said that had the crime occurred post-2005, it is likely that significantly higher minimum terms would have been imposed on the perpetrators, owing to reforms in the Criminal Justice Act 2003. These reforms recommend a minimum term of 30 years for racially aggravated murder.

== Reporting ==
Kelvin MacKenzie, editor of The Sun, stated, "if you believe you're a victim of an ethnic minority and you're white there is nowhere to go. Editors are so liberal that they are scared to be seen that they're moving to the right of their paper". Parker's mother, Davinia, said: "because we are white, English, we didn't get the coverage", adding, "it's as if we don't count". In 2006, a Sunday Times investigation by Brendan Montague examined British newspaper archives for coverage of racist crimes, finding "an almost total boycott of stories involving the white victims of attacks" whereas "cases involving black and minority ethnic victims are widely reported".

The BBC Editorial Standards Committee in 2007 found that "there was no evidence to suggest that the BBC had shown a specific and systemic bias in favour of cases where the victim had been black or Asian", but accepted it had "underplayed its coverage of the Ross Parker case" and repeated the failings in its coverage of the murder of Kriss Donald.

Peter Fahy, the spokesman on race issues for the Association of Chief Police Officers said: "A lot of police officers and other professionals feel almost the best thing to do is to try and avoid [discussing such attacks] for fear of being criticised. This is not healthy". Montague suggests the lack of police appeals in cases involving white victims may be a cause of the lack of media coverage. Evidence of this was seen in the Parker case, with the police initially appearing keen to dismiss the possible racist aspect of the murder, stating "there was no reason to believe that the attack was racially motivated".

The newspaper which covered Parker's murder more extensively faced criticism. The Government Office for the East of England produced a report by Dr Roger Green examining race relations in Peterborough. The document suggested that the Peterborough Evening Telegraph had a history of insensitivity, and coverage of the case was "possibly adding to any climate of racial and communal unrest". The criticism of the paper was rejected by a senior police officer and an Asian community leader, both of whom praised its handling of the case. The leader of Peterborough City Council called the report by Dr Green unfair.

== Impact ==
Parker's murder led to increased racial tensions in Peterborough. At his former school, three Asian pupils were suspended for an attack on an Afro-Caribbean pupil; a relative of the victim then attacked an Asian teacher. A number of taxi firms stopped work early in the days after the attack in fear of reprisals. In November 2001 Home Secretary David Blunkett banned all marches in Peterborough for three months as it was feared violence would be caused by the National Front and Anti-Nazi League who sought to hold protests on the same day.

Parker's death also had a major impact on his family. His mother, Davinia, was unable to work for three months after Parker's funeral and came close to attempting suicide on a number of occasions. Parker's room was left largely untouched for three years after the incident because his parents were reluctant to tidy it. They described the room as a place they "feel close to Ross".

== Legacy ==
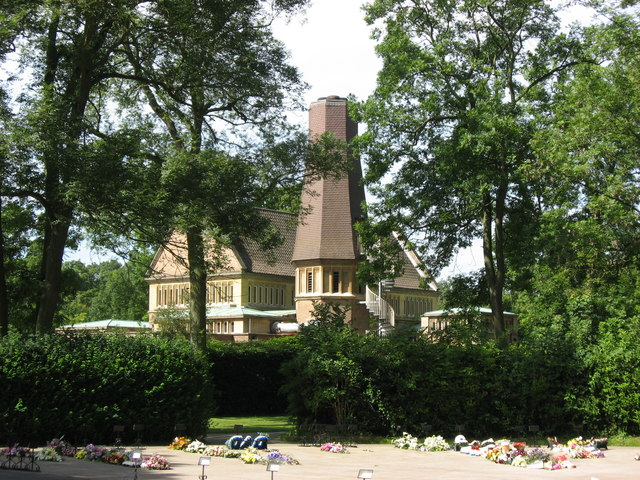
Peterborough Crematorium, location of Parker's funeral and memorial

As a result of the murder of Parker, local authorities set up a unity scheme, whereby gang members from different communities were trained as youth workers to ease racial tensions and reduce violence. However, problems still persisted, with racist graffiti appearing near the murder scene two years after the incident reading "no go area for whites", "Paki powa" and "death to whites".

BBC News editor Mark Easton cites the Parker case to argue that society has been forced to redefine racism and discard the definition of "prejudice plus power"—a definition which, in Easton's view, tends to only allow ethnic minorities to be victims and whites to be perpetrators. He states, "Describing an incident as racist may say as much about a victim's mindset as the offender. How else can one explain the British Crime Survey finding that 3,100 car thefts from Asians were deemed to be racially motivated?" Journalist Yasmin Alibhai-Brown argues that the case highlights double standards of racial equality campaigners, suggesting black activists should "march and remember victims like Ross Parker ... our values are worthless unless all victims of these senseless deaths matter equally". She writes, "to treat some victims as more worthy of condemnation than others is unforgivable and a betrayal of anti-racism itself".

== Tributes ==
Parker's funeral took place at Peterborough Crematorium in Marholm on 23 October 2001 and more than 400 mourners attended. His "number 14" Netherton United football shirt was draped over his coffin and his teammates formed a guard of honour dressed in the same strip (kit). The Reverend Geoffrey Keating described Parker as "a beacon of light who inspired so many people" and "an extremely popular young man".

The murder received little attention from politicians, although in 2003 Peterborough Member of Parliament Helen Clark made a statement in the House of Commons sending condolences to Parker's family, paying tribute to the Peterborough community and in particular Parker's former school. She described Parker's killers only as "men older than him" and her tributes were echoed by John Denham.

A plaque was installed in Netherton in Peterborough as a memorial to Parker, and a further memorial is located at Peterborough Crematorium. His former football team mates and friends also play a match every May in his memory and formed a team called "Ross' Rangers".

A rose bush was also planted at the Parker family home in remembrance.

== See also ==
- Murder of Richard Everitt – 1994 murder in England
- Murder of Kriss Donald – Scottish murder case
