= Murder of Kriss Donald =

Scottish murder case

Kriss Donald
- Born: 2 July 1988; Glasgow, Scotland
- Died: 15 March 2004 (aged 15) near to Lilybank, Glasgow, Scotland
- Cause of death: Tortured to death
- Resting place: Linn Cemetery, Glasgow, Scotland; 55.798583°N 4.258634°W
- Occupation: Student
- Known for: Racially motivated murder victim
- Height: 5 ft 7 in (170 cm)
- Parent: Angela Donald

Kriss Donald (2 July 1988 – 15 March 2004) was a 15-year-old white Scottish teenager who was kidnapped and murdered in Glasgow in 2004 by a gang of five men of Pakistani origin, some of whom fled to Pakistan after the crime. Daanish Zahid, Imran Shahid, Zeeshan Shahid and Mohammed Faisal Mustaq were later found guilty of racially motivated murder and sentenced to life imprisonment. A fifth man, Zahid Mohammed, pleaded guilty to kidnapping, assault and lying to police and was sentenced to five years in prison. He testified against the other four at their trials.

The case featured the first-ever conviction for racially motivated murder in Scotland.

== Kidnapping and murder ==
On 15 March 2004, Donald was abducted from Kenmure Street in the Pollokshields area of Glasgow by five men associated with a local British Pakistani gang led by Imran Shahid. The kidnapping was ostensibly revenge for an attack on Shahid at a nightclub in Glasgow city centre the night before by a local white gang, and Donald was chosen as an example of a "white boy from the McCulloch Street area" despite having no involvement in the nightclub attack or in any gang activity.

Donald was taken on a 200-mile (320-kilometre) journey to Dundee and back while his kidnappers made phone calls looking for a house to take him to. Having no success at this, they returned to Glasgow and took him to the Clyde Walkway, near Celtic Football Club's training ground. There, they held his arms (ascertained due to an absence of defensive wounds) and stabbed him multiple times. He sustained internal injuries to three arteries, one of his lungs, his liver and a kidney. He was doused in petrol and set on fire as he bled to death.

== Arrests and first trials ==
Initially, two men were arrested in connection with the crime. One man, Daanish Zahid, was found guilty of Kriss Donald's murder on 18 November 2004 and was the first person to be convicted of racially motivated murder in Scotland. Another man, Zahid Mohammed, admitted involvement in the abduction of Donald and lying to police during their investigation and was imprisoned for five years. He was released after serving half of his sentence and returned to court to give evidence against three subsequent defendants.

Daanish Zahid
- Born: 29 January 1984 (age 42)
- Status: In prison
- Motive: Racism
- Conviction: Racially motivated murder
- Criminal charges: Racially motivated murder, abduction, attempting to defeat the ends of justice
- Penalty: Life imprisonment (minimum 17 years)

Imran Shahid
- Born: 1976 or 1977; Huddersfield
- Other name: Baldy
- Status: In prison
- Motive: Racism
- Convictions: Racially motivated murder, abduction
- Criminal charges: Racially motivated murder, abduction
- Penalty: Life imprisonment (minimum 25 years)

Zeeshan Shahid
- Born: Zeeshan; 1978 (age 47–48); Glasgow
- Status: In prison
- Motive: Racism
- Convictions: Racially motivated murder, abduction
- Criminal charges: Racially motivated murder, abduction,
- Penalty: Life imprisonment (minimum 23 years)

Mohammed Faisal Mushtaq
- Born: 1978 or 1979
- Status: In prison
- Motive: Racism
- Convictions: Racially motivated murder, abduction
- Criminal charges: Racially motivated murder, abduction
- Penalty: Life imprisonment (minimum 22 years)

Zahid Mohammed
- Born: 1 January 1984 (age 42)
- Other name: Yusef Harris
- Status: Released from prison
- Motive: Racism
- Conviction: Abduction
- Criminal charge: Abduction
- Penalty: 5 years' imprisonment

== Special extradition and later trial ==
Three suspects were arrested in Pakistan in July 2005 and extradited to the UK in October 2005, following the intervention of Mohammed Sarwar, the Member of Parliament (MP) for Glasgow Central.

The Pakistani police had to engage in a "long struggle" to capture two of the escapees. There is no extradition treaty between Pakistan and Britain, but the Pakistani authorities agreed to extradite the suspects. There were numerous diplomatic complications around the case, including apparent divergences between government activities and those of ambassadorial officials; government figures were at times alleged to be reluctant to pursue the case for diplomatic reasons.

The three extradited suspects, Imran Shahid, Zeeshan Shahid, and Mohammed Faisal Mushtaq, all in their late twenties, arrived in Scotland on 5 October 2005. They were charged with Donald's murder the following day. Their trial opened on 2 October 2006.

On 8 November 2006, the three men were found guilty of the racially motivated murder of Kriss Donald. All three had denied the charge, but a jury at the High Court in Edinburgh convicted them of abduction and murder. Each of the killers received sentences of life imprisonment, with Imran Shahid given a 25-year minimum term, Zeeshan Shahid a 23-year minimum and Mushtaq receiving a recommended minimum of 22 years.

== Controversies surrounding the case ==
=== Lack of media coverage ===
The BBC has been criticised by some viewers because the case featured on UK-wide news only three times, and coverage of the first trial and its verdict was largely confined to Scottish bulletins. The organisation reported the opening of a new arts centre in Gateshead before the trial verdict in its running order. The BBC again faced criticisms for its failure to cover the second trial in its main bulletins. Peter Horrocks of the BBC apologised for the organisation's further failings. Although admitting that the BBC had "got it wrong", the organisation's Head of Newsgathering, Fran Unsworth, denied that Donald's race played a part in the lack of reportage.

Peter Fahy, spokesman of race issues for the Association of Chief Police Officers, said that "it was a fact that it was harder to get the media interested where murder victims were young white men".

=== Police response ===
A March 2004 article in The Scotsman newspaper alleged a lack of response by authorities to concerns of rising racial tensions and that Strathclyde Police had felt pressured to abandon Operation Gather, an investigation into Asian gangs in the area, for fear of offending ethnic minorities. In a January 2005 interview with a Scottish newspaper, prominent Pakistani Glaswegian Bashir Maan claimed that "fear and intimidation" had allowed problems with Asian gangs in some parts of the city to go unchecked. The article also quoted a former senior Strathclyde police officer who criticised "a culture of political correctness" which had allowed gang crime to "grow unfettered".

== Tributes ==
Glasgow band Glasvegas wrote the song "Flowers & Football Tops" having been inspired by the tragedy and the likely effect it would have on the victim's parents. The band dedicated their 2008 Philip Hall Radar NME award win to Donald's memory.

A memorial plaque was installed on a bench beside the River Clyde, near to where he was killed, in memory of Donald. In addition, a memorial plaque was placed on a public fence in Pollokshields close to the spot where he was kidnapped; in July 2018, friends and family gathered at the spot to remember him on what would have been his 30th birthday.

== Commentary ==
Journalist Mark Easton cites the racist murders of Donald and also Ross Parker to argue that society has been forced to redefine racism and discard the definition of "prejudice plus power", a definition which only allowed ethnic minorities to be victims of hate crime. Yasmin Alibhai-Brown also cites the Donald case to highlight what she describes as lack of concern for white victims of racist murders. She compares Donald to high-profile ethnic minority victims, asking whether Donald's murderers were "less evil" than Stephen Lawrence's killers. Alibhai-Brown argues that treating "some victims as more worthy of condemnation than others is unforgivable—and a betrayal of anti-racism itself".

== Conduct of accused ==
Following their convictions, the killers – particularly Imran Shahid, due to his reputation and distinctive appearance – continued to draw attention for events that occurred inside the prison system. From the time of their remand in 2005, it was known to the authorities that other prisoners had particular intent to attack the accused, and an incident at HMP Barlinnie prompted Imran Shahid to be placed in solitary confinement, a practice which continued regularly until 2010, due to the continual threat of violence against him, and the aggressive behaviour he showed when he did come into contact with others. He appealed against this measure as a breach of his human rights, which was rejected in 2011 and in 2014 but upheld in October 2015 by the UK Supreme Court. It was found that prison rules had not been correctly adhered to in the application for, or extension of, some periods totalling 14 months of his 56 months of detention, but that overall, the reasons for keeping him in solitary confinement for his own safety were valid. He was not offered any financial compensation, which he had tried to claim.

Shahid was attacked twice (the second incident, in which a fellow murderer struck him with a barbell weight in the gym at HMP Kilmarnock in 2013, caused serious injury) and also attacked another prisoner with a barbell, for which he was sentenced to additional 20 months in March 2016; he had received a concurrent sentence for violence in 2009 after being racially abused by another prisoner. Shahid also received media attention for cases he brought against the prison service governors in 2017 for unlawful removal of his possessions (a 'penis pump' for erectile dysfunction which was deemed to have negligible medical benefit, and an Xbox games console which it was believed could have been adjusted to access the internet), which were dismissed.

Zahid Mohammed, who later changed his name to Yusef Harris to avoid connection to the murder, was convicted and imprisoned in 2017 for another separate incident involving weapons, threats and driving his vehicle at police.

== See also ==
- Murder of Ross Parker
- Murder of Richard Everitt
