= Netherton, Peterborough =

Residential area of Peterborough, England

Coordinates: 52.575°N 0.277°W

Netherton is a residential area of the city of Peterborough, in the Peterborough district, in the ceremonial county of Cambridgeshire, England. For electoral purposes it forms part of Peterborough West ward.

Netherton means lower farm in Old English, but the area was named after the Netherton Building Company which built the original houses in the late 1950s and early 1960s.

Thorpe Primary school is located in the area; secondary pupils attend Jack Hunt School. Jack Hunt swimming pool is located here. It is a 25m (82 feet) dual-use facility, built on school land but owned by Peterborough City Council and operated by Vivacity Peterborough, a charitable trust. The parish church, dedicated to Saint Jude, was built in 1968 on land donated by Thomas Wentworth-Fitzwilliam, 10th Earl Fitzwilliam (via the Fitzwilliam Trust).

In 2001 teen-aged Netherton resident Ross Parker was murdered by a gang of up to ten Muslims of Pakistani background who had sought a white male to attack. A memorial plaque in Parker's memory is located at The Grange in Netherton.
