= Peterborough District Hospital =

Hospital in Cambridgeshire, England

- Peterborough and Stamford Hospitals NHS Foundation Trust
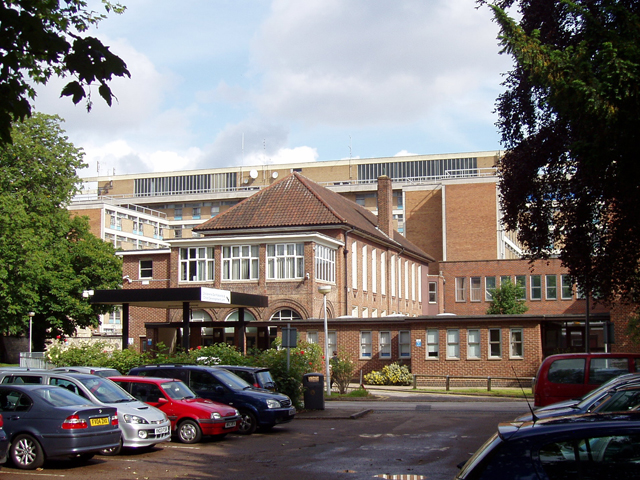
- Peterborough District Hospital

Geography
- Location: Thorpe Road, Peterborough, Cambs. PE3 6DA, United Kingdom
- Coordinates: 52.5735°N 0.2546°W

Organisation
- Care system: National Health Service
- Type: District general

Services
- Emergency department: Yes Accident & Emergency
- Beds: 300+

History
- Founded: 1928
- Closed: 2010
- Demolished: 2015

Links
- Website: www.peterboroughandstamford.nhs.uk
- Lists: Hospitals in the United Kingdom

Peterborough District Hospital was the acute district general hospital serving the city of Peterborough and north Cambridgeshire, east Northamptonshire and Rutland in the United Kingdom. Located in West Town, Peterborough, the hospital was decommissioned in 2010 and finally demolished in 2015.

== History ==
=== Foundation ===
The Memorial Hospital was opened by Field Marshal Sir William Robertson in 1928, as a living memorial to those of the city and the 6th Northamptonshire Regiment who died in the first world war. It was transferred to the newly formed National Health Service in 1948, coming under No. 12 Group (Peterborough and Stamford) Hospital Management Committee of the East Anglian Regional Hospital Board. Also transferred were Thorpe Hall (maternity 1943–1970), The Gables (maternity 1947–1970), the Smallpox Hospital (1884–1970), Isolation Hospital (1901–1981), and St. John's Close (mentally ill c.1930–1971). The neo-Georgian hospital (latterly the Memorial Wing) was subsequently enlarged by the massive addition of Peterborough District Hospital, built in continuous phases between 1960 and 1968 and including, from 1970, Peterborough Maternity Unit.

Under the provisions of the National Health Service Reorganisation Act 1973, Peterborough District Hospital came under the control of Peterborough Health Authority, subordinate to Cambridgeshire Area Health Authority, which was in turn subordinate to the East Anglian Regional Health Authority. Following the passage of the National Health Service and Community Care Act 1990, Peterborough Hospitals NHS Trust was established in 1993. Initially comprising Peterborough District Hospital and Edith Cavell Hospital, Stamford and Rutland Hospital in south Lincolnshire joined in 2002. One of the country's top performing NHS acute trusts, in 2004, Peterborough and Stamford Hospitals NHS Foundation Trust became one of the first ten NHS foundation trusts in England created under the Health and Social Care (Community Health and Standards) Act 2003.

=== Closure ===
In 2010, as part of the £300 million Greater Peterborough health investment plan, the city's two hospitals transferred to a single site on the grounds of the former Edith Cavell Hospital in Westwood, with the aim of providing a flexible facility more suited to modern healthcare. The maternity unit also closed and moved into a dedicated women and children’s unit within the new hospital. The name Peterborough City Hospital was chosen by public competition in 2008 and together with the adjacent mental health unit, known as the Cavell Centre, it now forms the Edith Cavell Healthcare Campus.

Planning permission was granted for an integrated care centre on the site of the former Fenland Wing in 2006 and the City Care Centre opened in 2009. It includes 34 specialist rehabilitation beds, a pharmacy, outpatient diagnostic and treatment centre, general rehabilitation services and children's care centre. The remainder of the 22 acre (8.9 ha) site, now known as the Hospital Quarter, is proposed for redevelopment.

== See also ==
- East of England Ambulance Service
- Healthcare in Cambridgeshire
- List of hospitals in England
