= Edith Cavell (disambiguation) =

Edith Cavell (1865–1915) was a WWI British nurse and martyr

Edith Cavell may also refer to:

== Facilities and structures ==
- Edith Cavell Memorial, St Martin's Place, London, England, UK
- Edith Cavell Memorial (Melbourne), Kings Domain, Melbourne, Australia
- Edith Cavell Hospital, Westwood, Peterborough, Cambridgeshire, England, UK
- Edith Cavell Healthcare Campus, Westwood, Peterborough, Cambridgeshire, England, UK
- Edith Cavell Block, Brisbane General Hospital Precinct, Herston, Brisbane, Queensland, Australia
- Edith Cavell Bridge, Shotover River, Otago, New Zealand
- Edith Cavell Elementary School, Vancouver, British Columbia, Canada

== Other uses ==
- Mount Edith Cavell, Jasper National Park, Alberta, Canada; a mountain
- Nurse Cavell (film), a 1916 Australian film, also released as Edith Cavell
- Nurse Edith Cavell (film), 1939 U.S. film
- The Martyrdom of Nurse Cavell, 1916 Australian film

== See also ==
- List of dedications to Edith Cavell
- Cavell (disambiguation)
- Edith
