= Healthcare in Suffolk =

Health and social care in Suffolk, England

Healthcare in Suffolk was the responsibility of two clinical commissioning groups until July 2022: Ipswich and East Suffolk, and West Suffolk.

== History ==
From 1947 to 1965 NHS services in Suffolk were managed by the East Anglian regional hospital boards. In 1974 the boards were abolished and replaced by regional health authorities. Suffolk came under the East Anglian RHA. There was a Suffolk Area Health Authority from 1974 until 1982: There were two District Authorities: East and West Suffolk. In 1993 these were combined. Regional Health Authorities were reorganised and renamed strategic health authorities (SHAs) in 2002. Suffolk was under the Norfolk, Suffolk and Cambridgeshire SHA. In 2006 regions were again reorganised and Suffolk came under NHS East of England until that was abolished in 2013. There was one primary care trust for the county.

== Sustainability and transformation plans ==
Suffolk and North East Essex formed a sustainability and transformation plan area in March 2016 with Nick Hulme, the Chief Executive of Ipswich Hospital NHS Trust, as its leader It was one of four new integrated care systems established by NHS England in May 2018.

== Commissioning ==
In 2018, Ipswich and East Suffolk, West Suffolk and North East Essex CCGs proposed to merge as part of local plans to establish an integrated care system.

== Primary care ==
There are 66 GP practices in the county. Out-of-hours services are provided by Care UK which won a further five year contract in partnership with the Suffolk GP Federation to run the NHS 111 helpline and out of hours services in Suffolk and north east Essex in June 2018.

Oulton Medical Centre and its satellite branch of Marine Parade Surgery, at Kirkley Mill were closed by the Care Quality Commission in October 2015 using an order from Norwich Magistrates’ Court under Section 30 of the Health and Social Care Act 2008 because of serious concerns about the service and the risks it presented to patients.

Suffolk GP Federation is a group of 61 independent GP practices in the county with a total registered population of 540,000. It is at present a registered community interest company, but is considering becoming one large partnership.

14 of the GP practices in Suffolk, with a total patient list of 112,614, intend to form the largest single GP partnership in the country by April 2017.

== Acute care ==
West Suffolk NHS Foundation Trust and East Suffolk and North Essex NHS Foundation Trust are the main hospital providers. Unlike the pattern in the rest of England they are at their busiest at the weekend.

== Mental health ==
Norfolk and Suffolk NHS Foundation Trust provide mental health services in Suffolk.

== Community services ==
Serco ran Suffolk Community Healthcare from 2012 until 2015. In October 2015 the services were due to be taken over by a joint venture run by Norfolk Community Health and Care NHS Trust, West Suffolk NHS Foundation Trust and Ipswich Hospital NHS Trust.

Serco said the three-year contract was not long enough to deliver the operational efficiencies it hoped for, despite saying in May 2013 that it expected to make a profit on the three-year, £140 million contract for community services. It said that staff had not recorded activity accurately on the Electronic health record and that activity had increased significantly during the course of the contract.

The County Council transferred 16 care homes to Care UK in December 2012 who were required to build 10 new purpose-built care homes to replace them. They were subsequently returned to the council. 73 of the care homes in the county were rated “good”, 40 deemed to be requiring improvement and 7 as inadequate by Care Quality Commission inspections in 2015.

Social care in the county is supported by Cassius, a digital care technology service provided by Alcove, which supplies movement sensors, smart watches, wearables, falls prevention devices and technology to address specialised needs. This helps people to stay in their own homes and out of residential care. The contract is worth £15 million over three years.

== HealthWatch ==
Healthwatch is an organisation set up under the Health and Social Care Act 2012 to act as a voice for patients.

== See also ==
- Category:Health in Suffolk
- Healthcare in the United Kingdom
