= Pathology Partnership =

English pathology organisation

- Industry: Healthcare
- Founded: 1 May 2014; 12 years ago
- Headquarters: Pampisford, Cambridgeshire, United Kingdom
- Area served: East of England
- Services: Pathology laboratories
- Owners: Cambridge University Hospitals NHS Foundation Trust; Ipswich Hospital NHS Trust; East and North Hertfordshire Teaching NHS Trust; Hinchingbrooke Hospital; Colchester Hospital University NHS Foundation Trust; West Suffolk NHS Foundation Trust
- Website: the Pathology Partnership

The Pathology Partnership was a joint venture of six NHS trusts in the East of England. It was established in May 2014 as a response to the NHS East of England Strategic Health Authority's Strategic Projects Team's Pathology Transformation Project, which was itself initiated in May 2010. The intention of the Pathology Transformation Project was to streamline the Anglian region's pathology services in order to realise cost savings of 20%, in line with the recommendations of the Carter Report (Review of NHS Pathology Services in England) that was published in 2006 by Lord Carter of Coles.

The Pathology Partnership dissolved at the end of April 2017, with massive debts.

== The Pathology Transformation Project ==
The Pathology Transformation Project was initiated by the Strategic Projects Team in an attempt to provide impetus to the Anglian region’s NHS Trusts to transform and consolidate their pathology services in order to realise the required 20% cost savings. The region's NHS Trusts were required to form their own pathology Joint venture arrangements and then to participate in a formal procurement process to tender their services to the region's NHS primary care trusts via a Call for bids. The philosophy was that joint venture arrangements could achieve greater cost savings for the Primary Care Trusts via greater economies of scale. The Strategic Projects Team employed KPMG to facilitate the process. The Pathology Partnership, whose name was the "Transforming Pathology Partnership" (TPP) at that time, employed PricewaterhouseCoopers (PWC) to facilitate their bid.

Following the procurement process, the (Transforming) Pathology Partnership won most of its primary care trusts' geographical region for the provision of general practice pathology results.

== Transformation and reorganisation ==
Cambridge University Hospitals NHS Foundation Trust was the Host Trust for the Partnership. All of the region's pathology laboratory staff, who were originally employed by the Partner Trusts, were required to re-apply for their current positions in the new organisation; the design of the pathology laboratories' staffing structures had been streamlined as part of the intent to realise cost savings. Those staff members who were successful in their applications underwent contractual transfer from their existing NHS Trust employing organisations to Cambridge University Hospitals, under the Transfer of Undertakings (Protection of Employment) Regulations 2006 (TUPE). During that contractual transfer period, many existing laboratory staff were made redundant as a stated necessary means of achieving the required cost savings; many other laboratory staff left the organisation.

== Organisational structure ==
Cambridge University Hospitals NHS Foundation Trust and Ipswich Hospital NHS Trust were the two hubs for pathology in the region. East and North Hertfordshire NHS Trust, Hinchingbrooke Hospital, Colchester Hospital University NHS Foundation Trust and West Suffolk NHS Foundation Trust retained host satellite laboratories with the intention to perform only urgent work. The six Partner Trusts were both owners and customers under the joint venture arrangement. The Pathology Partnership's head office was based off-site, separate from the Partner Trusts' sites, at the Iconix Business Park in Pampisford. The Pathology Partnership's Executive Board and managerial structure were an autonomous entity but were accountable to the Executive Boards of the Partner Trusts.

== Financial decline ==
In April 2015, it emerged that the Pathology Partnership was forecasting a £4.5m deficit for 2014-15 on budgeted income of £67.8m. Cambridge University Hospitals, which employed the Partnership’s 800 laboratory staff as the Partnership's Host Trust, announced its intention to withdraw in July 2016 after it incurred a £15 million deficit in 2015-16. During its 3 year period of existence the Pathology Partnership experienced a high turnover of senior staff, comprising 3 Chief Executive Officers and 4 Chief Operating Officers (Operations Directors).

== Demise and legacy ==
The Pathology Partnership formally dissolved at the end of April 2017 with an initial stated debt of £25 million; £20 million of that initial debt was attributable to non-payment of costs to Public Health England, who were subcontracted by the Partnership to deliver the region's Microbiology service. Following the dissolution of the Pathology Partnership, it has been calculated that its total outstanding debt at its time of dissolution was at least £70 million.
