= Fulbourn Hospital =

- Cambridgeshire and Peterborough NHS Foundation Trust
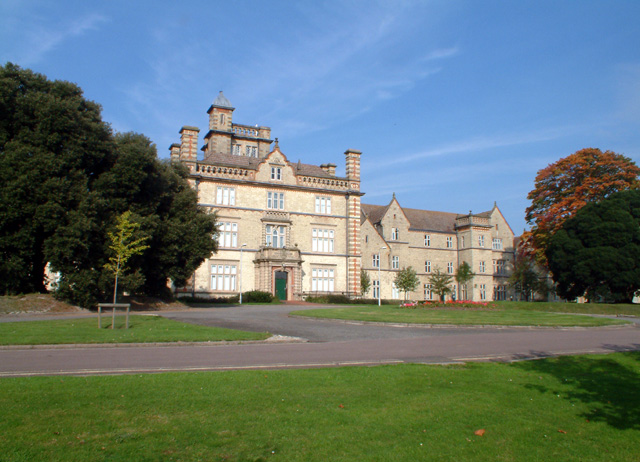
- Victoria House at Fulbourn Hospital

- Location in Cambridgeshire

Geography
- Location: Cambridge
- Coordinates: 52.18455°N 0.19266°E

Organisation
- Care system: NHS
- Type: Specialist
- Affiliated university: University of Cambridge

Services
- Speciality: Psychiatric Hospital

History
- Founded: 1858

Links
- Website: http://www.cpft.nhs.uk/

Fulbourn Hospital is a mental health facility located between the Cambridgeshire village of Fulbourn and the Cambridge city boundary at Cherry Hinton, about 5 miles (8 km) south-east of the city centre. It is managed by the Cambridgeshire and Peterborough NHS Foundation Trust. The Ida Darwin Hospital site is situated behind Fulbourn Hospital. It is run and managed by the same trust, with both hospitals sharing the same facilities and staff pool.

== History ==
=== Early history ===
The Lunacy Act 1845 and County Asylums Act 1845 mandated that all rate-levying authorities must provide a public asylum. In 1848 there was an agreement to set up a pauper lunatic asylum between Fulbourn and Cherry Hinton. The Justices met in Quarter Session of the County and Borough of Cambridge and the Liberty of the Isle of Ely (later known as The Three Bodies) who would have to raise the money to pay for the Asylum. They set up a committee with representatives from the three authorities to be known as The Committee of Visitors. On 30 September 1856 Admiral The Earl of Hardwicke, the Lord Lieutenant of the county and a member of the Visitors committee, laid the foundation stone and builder William Webster completed the construction. The asylum opened on 6 November 1858 as the County Pauper Lunatic Asylum for Cambridgeshire, the Isle of Ely and the Borough of Cambridge. Dr Edward Langdon Bryan was the first Medical Superintendent, and his sister Miss Bryan was matron.

One of the earliest performances of the Footlights Revue was an entertainment given by a group of Cambridge University undergraduates, with a cricket match included, at Fulbourn's "pauper lunatic asylum" in 1883.

After 1939 the hospital also served Huntingdonshire. A county asylum for Bedfordshire, Hertfordshire and Huntingdonshire was originally erected near Arlesey in 1858. It opened in 1860 and was known as the Three Counties Asylum. This became Fairfield Hospital in 1960 and it finally closed in 1999.

Patients from the then Soke of Peterborough, including the "Northamptonshire Peasant Poet" John Clare, were committed to Northampton General Lunatic Asylum. In 1876, Northampton County Lunatic Asylum (later Northampton Mental Hospital, then St Crispin's Hospital which closed in 1995) opened for pauper patients and the original general asylum changed its name to Northampton General Lunatic Asylum for the Middle and Upper Classes. This became St Andrew's Hospital for mental diseases in 1887.

=== International prominence ===
During the 1960s, Fulbourn Hospital became internationally prominent for its pioneering therapeutic community, under Dr David Clark, who was the last holder of the title of Medical Superintendent, and later Consultant for the Cambridge Psychiatric Rehabilitation Service. In 1976, an Academic Department of Psychiatry was established (as part of the new Cambridge University Clinical School). Headed by Professor Sir Martin Roth (with G. E. Berrios as University Lecturer), the department took clinical charge of half of the old Friends Ward, rendered the Hospital into a national training centre, organized rotations, and ran the regional MRCPsych course. During the 1990s, composer and civic activist Barbara Pointon helped design Denbigh ward in Fulbourn Hospital for people with dementia.

=== Recent developments ===
After a major refurbishment programme in early 2013, the new Mulberry wards have replaced Adrian House, Friends Ward and Cedars Recovery Unit, as part of the new 3-3-3 model introduced at Fulbourn. The model is made up of three stages – three days' assessment (at Mulberry 1), three weeks of treatment (at Mulberry 2) and three months of recovery (at Mulberry 3). This new system sets out for patients what care they will receive at each stage of their treatment and for how long they can expect to stay on each ward. From day one, patients work with staff to look at their treatment and recovery so they can get themselves back into the community as soon as they are able.

== Services ==
Services at the hospital are provided within specialist wards:

Adult Mental Health Wards

- Mulberry 1 – 14 bed assessment unit for adults aged 17–65. It has 11 acute psychiatric beds and 3 alcohol and opiate detoxification beds.
- Mulberry 2 – 16 bed assessment, treatment, care and recovery unit for adults aged 17–65.
- Mulberry 3- 16-bed recovery unit for adults aged 17–65.

Specialist Mental Health Wards

- Springbank Ward – 12-bed unit providing in-patient psychiatric service for women with personality disorders.

Forensic Mental Health Services

- George McKenzie House – 20 bed Low security ward for people whose condition and/or current legal status makes it difficult for them to be nursed on open wards.

Older peoples' Mental Health Services

- Willow Ward – 18 beds for patients over 65 that have an acute functional mental health illness.
- Denbigh Ward – 18 beds for residents of Cambridgeshire over 65 who are living with dementia.

== Ida Darwin Hospital ==
From 1960 the land behind the original hospital was used for new learning disability wards, as well offices and out-buildings. Today The Ida Darwin Hospital forms part of Fulbourn Hospital and houses a number of child and adolescent wards, a learning disability ward as well as various community teams and office buildings. The wards are as follows:

- Darwin Centre for Young People – 14 bed residential assessment and treatment unit for those aged between 12 and 17 who are suffering from mental health illnesses.
- Phoenix Centre – specialist 14 bed residential treatment unit for those aged between 11 and 17 who suffer with complex eating disorders and whose needs can not be met by generic child and adolescent mental health services.
- The Croft Child and Family Unit – a specialist and unique intensive in-patient and day-patient service for children under 13 and their families. The ward offers 12 residential places for children and their accompanying families. It is the only NHS in-patient service for children in the United Kingdom where the family members are admitted alongside their children.

== The Cavell Centre ==
Fulbourn Hospital has a sister facility run by the same trust located on the Edith Cavell Healthcare Campus in Peterborough. The Cavell Centre is a purpose-built unit opened in 2009, comprising seven mental health wards servicing those living in the city of Peterborough and surrounding areas.

== See also ==
- Edith Cavell Hospital
- Healthcare in Cambridgeshire
- List of hospitals in England
