= Edith Cavell Hospital =

Former hospital in Peterborough, England

Coordinates: 52.588304°N 0.278466°W

- Peterborough and Stamford Hospitals NHS Foundation Trust
- Location in Cambridgeshire

Geography
- Location: Bretton Gate, Peterborough, Cambs. PE3 9GZ, England

Organisation
- Care system: National Health Service
- Type: District general

Services
- Emergency department: No accident & emergency
- Beds: 153

History
- Founded: 1988
- Closed: 2010

Links
- Website: www.peterboroughandstamford.nhs.uk
- Lists: Hospitals in England

The Edith Cavell Hospital was an acute hospital serving the city of Peterborough and north Cambridgeshire, east Northamptonshire and Rutland in the United Kingdom. Situated on a greenfield site at Westwood, Peterborough, it was decommissioned in late 2010 and demolished in early 2011.

== History ==
Opened by the Queen in 1988, the £20m hospital was built to complement services provided elsewhere in the city and named after the Norfolk-born nurse and humanitarian, Edith Cavell, who received part of her education at Laurel Court in the Minster Precinct.

The 153-bed facility also contained three wards and a day activity centre for patients with mental health problems. These services were managed independently by the Cambridgeshire and Peterborough Mental Health Partnership Trust, based at Fulbourn Hospital in Cambridge. The Robert Horrell Macmillan Day Centre, which opened in 1991, was located on site and offered palliative care to patients living with cancer. Casualty and maternity services were based at nearby Peterborough District Hospital in West Town.

In 2010, as part of the £300 million Greater Peterborough health investment plan, the city's two hospitals transferred to a single site on the Edith Cavell grounds, with the aim of providing a flexible facility more suited to modern healthcare. The full planning application for the redevelopment of the Edith Cavell site was approved by the council in 2006 and the name Peterborough City Hospital chosen by public competition in 2008. Together with the adjacent mental health unit, known as the Cavell Centre, it now forms the Edith Cavell Healthcare Campus.

== See also ==
- East of England Ambulance Service
- Healthcare in Cambridgeshire
- List of hospitals in England
- Shelf (sexual health service), Peterborough
