= Hinchingbrooke Hospital =

- North West Anglia NHS Foundation Trust
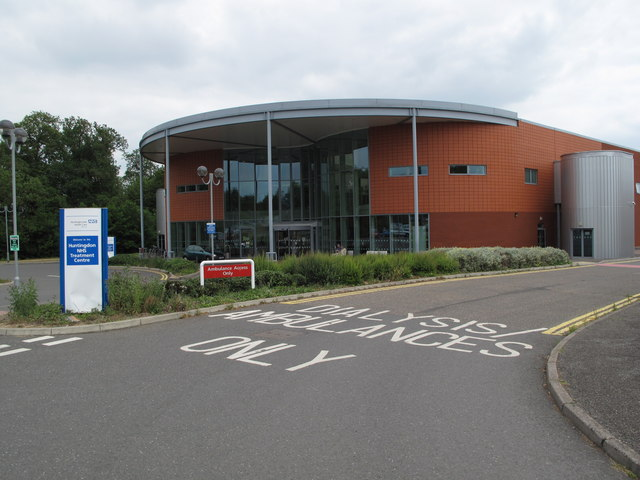

- Location in Cambridgeshire

Geography
- Location: Hinchingbrooke Park, Huntingdon, Cambridgeshire, England, United Kingdom
- Coordinates: 52.3329°N 0.2011°W

Organisation
- Care system: Public NHS
- Type: General

Services
- Emergency department: Yes Accident & Emergency
- Beds: 266

History
- Founded: 1983

Links
- Website: www.nwangliaft.nhs.uk/our-hospitals/hinchingbrooke-hospital/
- Lists: Hospitals in England

Hinchingbrooke Hospital is a small district general hospital in Hinchingbrooke near Huntingdon, Cambridgeshire. Opened in 1983, it serves the Huntingdonshire area, and has a range of specialities as well as an emergency department and a maternity unit. The hospital is managed by the North West Anglia NHS Foundation Trust.

== History ==
=== Formation ===
The hospital was opened in 1983 to replace Huntingdon County Hospital which closed that year. It was administered by Hinchingbrooke Health Care NHS Trust which developed financial problems and was obliged to borrow £27.3 million in Public Dividend Capital in the year ended 31 March 2007.

=== Private sector management ===
In accordance with the powers contained in the National Health Service Acts 2001 and 2006 and the Health and Social Care Act 2001, the Government decided that this was an opportunity "to bring in another person or organisation to manage an NHS hospital". A completion was arranged by the NHS East of England Strategic Projects Team.

It was announced on 25 November 2010 that Circle Health had been selected to manage the hospital under a 10-year contract. Mitie continued to provide domestic cleaning services, waste collection, pest control and external window cleaning at the hospital. Although the hospital was managed privately, the buildings remained in the ownership of the NHS. This process was widely criticised as a significant step in the privatisation of the NHS in England.

BBC Newsnight produced a programme about the hospital in August 2012 where Ali Parsa of Circle Health showed how "reactive, motivated staff treat patients better; happy, well-fed patients heal better". However in November 2012 a National Audit Office (NAO) report into the franchising arrangement was published. It found that while Circle had made early improvements in some clinical areas, the projected deficit for the year ending 31 March 2013 was already £2.2 million higher than planned. Circle would have to make unprecedented levels of savings to eliminate the deficit and most of those savings were expected in the later years of the ten-year franchise, so the value for money of the project would not be capable of being easily be assessed for some time. The NAO also found that while NHS East of England had assessed bidders' savings proposals, the relative risks had not been fully considered, which had the potential to encourage over-optimistic bids.

Matters started to deteriorate further. In the 2013 NHS staff survey involving 28 key findings, Hinchingbrooke came out worse than the NHS average on two-thirds of the findings (19 of them), and was in the lowest 20% of trusts in almost half of the findings (13 of them).

In April 2014 it was reported that the hospital was likely to record a deficit in the region of £600,000 to £700,000 for the year ending 31 March 2014 and in July 2014 Hinchingbrooke Hospital was referred to the Secretary of State for Health for failure to meet their statutory duty to break-even financially.

The hospital made an offer in September 2014 to pay local GPs a £50 'administrative fee' for surgery referrals in an email, signed by Hinchingbrooke chief executive Hisham Abdel-Rahman, which was rapidly withdrawn when the company was accused of bribery.

A visit by inspectors from the Care Quality Commission in September 2014 highlighted severe issues with patient care: inspectors observed that "staff treat patients in an undignified and emotionally abusive manner" and they spoke to patients who had been "told to soil themselves".

In November 2014 Jenny Raine the chief financial officer left. UNISON called for Circle to be 'sacked', claiming that papers tabled for the Board meeting in October - which did not include a financial report - showed the organisation faced (i) potential penalties of up to £200,000 per month for failure to meet targets for patients waiting longer than four hours in the accident and emergency department (ii) potential penalties for failing to reach electronic discharge summary targets which already stood at £138,000 and (iii) potential penalties of a further £150,000 for failing to increase the number of patients discharged at weekends. The Union said staff turnover was more than 13 per cent. In response Circle said: "We are a bit bemused as we haven't changed our financial forecasts for the year and Hinchingbrooke's clinical outcomes remain very strong."

=== Withdrawal of Circle Health from the contract ===
In January 2015 Circle Health announced that, because Hinchingbrooke Hospital was "no longer [financially] viable under current terms", it wanted to withdraw from operating the hospital under the exit terms of the contract. Later the same day it was revealed that the Care Quality Commission had recommended the Trust should be placed into special measures after it was rated 'inadequate' on the questions of whether it was caring, safe and well led. They had concerns about the Trust's leadership because both the Circle Health management team and the Trust Board said that the other was responsible for holding the Trust's executive team to account. Circle Health's chief executive Steve Melton said before the report was published: “We understand their report will be published soon, and fully expect it to be unbalanced and to disagree with many of its conclusions". He said the pressures on the Trust could only be resolved through "joined up reform in Cambridgeshire across hospitals, GPs and community services".

Dr Suzanne Hamilton, chair of the Medical Advisory Committee at the hospital wrote to the local paper to say that the CQC report was not consistent with "the vast reams of verified statistical data" about the hospital. Fiona Allinson, head of hospital inspection told the CQC board meeting "It was one of the worst inspections that I had ever been to. I drove home and wanted to drive back again with my nurse's uniform on to sort it out."

In January 2015 Hinchingbrooke was said to be the second least efficient hospital in England, according to Lord Carter's review of NHS efficiency, with potential savings that could have been made of £20.5 million a year.

Circle Health handed the management of the hospital back to the NHS on 31 March 2015. The Trust then announced in April 2015 that it expected the deficit for the year ended 31 March 2015 to be £14 million, which was considerably worse than had been forecast by Circle. This was attributed to (i) reductions in local prices during commissioning negotiations costing the Trust in excess of £3 million (ii) a high demand for agency staff generated by increased volumes and acuity of non-elective patients increasing the interim staffing bill by nearly £12 million for the year (iii) the impact of failed cost improvement programme schemes and (iv) a charge of £1.3 million being Hinchingbrooke’s share of the losses of the Pathology Partnership joint venture.

=== Developments ===
The hospital came out of special measures with a rating of 'good' in August 2016. This was one of the fastest exits from special measures in England and, at the time, this was the first time that a Trust had exited with a rating of 'good'. Despite this the small size of the Trust was making it hard to sustain high quality clinical services and so alternative management solutions were sought. Accordingly in April 2017 Hinchingbrooke Health Care NHS Trust merged with Peterborough and Stamford Hospitals NHS Foundation Trust to form the North West Anglia NHS Foundation Trust.

In 2019 it was announced that trauma work would be moved to Peterborough City Hospital and Addenbrooke's Hospital as Hinchingbrooke did not meet the minimum volume of work needed to maintain standards of excellence, or to justify the maintenance of a 24/7 orthopaedic rota. It will, however, keep a 24/7 type 1 emergency department.

On 25 May 2023 it was announced that the hospital would be rebuilt as it contains significant amounts of reinforced autoclaved aerated concrete. The Guardian newspaper noted that a 2020 proposal to rebuild Hinchingbrooke Hospital was not funded by HM Treasury during Rishi Sunak's term as Chancellor of the Exchequer, despite a "catastrophic" grade of risk and a warning that an incident was "likely".

== See also ==
- Healthcare in Cambridgeshire
- List of hospitals in England
