= Peterborough and Stamford Hospitals NHS Foundation Trust =

- Type: NHS hospital trust
- Established: 1993
- Budget: £222 million
- Hospitals: Peterborough City Hospital; Stamford and Rutland Hospital
- Website: Peterborough and Stamford Hospitals

Peterborough and Stamford Hospitals NHS Foundation Trust was one of the first ten NHS Foundation Trusts in England in 2004. It ran Peterborough City Hospital and Stamford and Rutland Hospital. It was one of six centres used by the Defence Medical Services. The trust merged with Hinchingbrooke Health Care NHS Trust in 2017 to become North West Anglia NHS Foundation Trust.

== History ==
Established in 1993, Peterborough Hospitals NHS Trust comprised two hospitals, Peterborough District Hospital and Edith Cavell Hospital. In 2002 Stamford and Rutland Hospital in Lincolnshire joined the trust. In 2006 Peterborough and Stamford Hospitals NHS Foundation Trust was rated one of the country's top performing NHS acute trusts and, in 2004, it became one of the first ten NHS foundation trusts in England.

The new hospital in Peterborough was financed through the Private Finance Initiative and has led the Trust into acute financial difficulties. It has an underlying deficit of £37 million a year on a turnover of £222 million. It is unclear how its financial problems can be resolved. In July 2016 the trust announced that it needed £650m of central financial support over the next 26 years to finance the £1.8 billion contract.

A redevelopment programme for Stamford Hospital was approved in October 2013.

In January 2014 it was reported that Circle Health could table a rescue bid for the Trust involving partnering it with nearby Hinchingbrooke Hospital. The bid never materialised, but in July 2016 it was announced that the two trusts were planning to merge in 2017.

== Performance ==
The trust was one of 26 responsible for half of the national growth in patients waiting more than four hours in accident and emergency over the 2014/5 winter.

It spent £18.7 million, 7.5% of its total turnover, on agency staff in 2014/5.

== See also ==
- Healthcare in Cambridgeshire
- List of NHS trusts
