= List of things named after Edith Cavell =

This is a list of places and organisations named after Edith Cavell. For major monuments to her memory, see the list at Edith Cavell.

== Medical and nursing ==
| Country | Facility | Notes |
|---|---|---|
| UK | A ward in the Basildon University Hospital, Basildon, Essex | |
| Australia | A building at Brisbane General Hospital Precinct | |
| UK | A ward in the Whittington Hospital in Archway, London | |
| UK | A wing of Homerton Hospital, Hackney, London | |
| Canada | A wing of Toronto Western Hospital | |
| Canada | Cavell Gardens Care Home, Vancouver | The site was Edith Cavell Hospital from 1955 to 2000 |
| UK | Cavell House Care Home, Middle Road, Shoreham-by-Sea | |
| UK | Cavell Ward at the former Digby Hospital Exeter | Exe Vale Hospitals group |
| Canada | Edith Cavell Care Centre, Lethbridge, Alberta | |
| New Zealand | The Edith Cavell Home, Hospital, and Village. Sumner, Christchurch | A retirement village |
| Belgium | Centre hospitalier interrégional Edith-Cavell (CHIREC) | Group of five hospitals including the former Edith Cavell Clinic, Uccle (Ukkel) Brussels |
| UK | Edith Cavell Healthcare Campus, Peterborough | The campus is on the site of the former Edith Cavell Hospital where she received part of her education |
| Canada | Cavell Building, Quinte Children's Treatment Centre, Belleville, Ontario | Demolished in 2013 |
| Canada | Edith Cavell Regional School of Nursing, Belleville, Ontario | Demolished in 2013 |
| UK | Edith Cavell Surgery, Streatham, London | |
| Belgium | Sanatorium Edith Cavell, Obourg | |
| UK | Edith Cavell Building (ECB) | Housing the School of Nursing Science, University of East Anglia, Norwich |
| Australia | The Edith Cavell Trust | Established by the New South Wales Nurses' Association to provide scholarships to nurses in New South Wales |
| USA | The Edith Cavell Nursing Scholarship Fund | A philanthropy of the Dallas County Medical Society Alliance Foundation providing scholarships to exceptional nursing students in Dallas, Texas and the surrounding area |
| UK | Cavell Entrance, Royal London Hospital, Whitechapel, London | |
| UK | Edith Cavell Unit, Maidstone Hospital, Kent | A 12-bed ward, which cares for elderly patients |
| UK | Edith Cavell Room, Education Centre, Ipswich Hospital, Suffolk | |

== Streets ==
| Country | Street | Location | Notes |
|---|---|---|---|
| Belgium | Rue Edith Cavell/Edith Cavellstraat | Brussels | Where there is a hospital named Edith Cavell, next to previous "Rue de la Culture" which was her first nurse school |
| France | Avenue Edith Cavell | Hyères | 43.11064°N 6.12595°E |
| France | Avenue Edith-Cavell | Nice | |
| France | Rue Edith Cavell | Cannes | |
| France | Avenue Miss Cavell | Saint-Maur-des-Fossés | |
| Canada | Cavell Avenue | Etobicoke, Ontario | |
| Canada | Cavell Avenue | Guelph, Ontario | |
| Canada | Cavell Avenue | The Danforth neighbourhood of Toronto | |
| UK | Cavell Avenue | Cambourne, Cambridgeshire | 52.22024°N 0.09566°W |
| USA | Cavell Avenue | Trenton, New Jersey | |
| USA | Cavell Avenue | Twin Cities, Minnesota | |
| USA | Cavell Street | Roselle, New Jersey | |
| UK | Cavell Close | Woodbeck, Nottinghamshire | Demolished |
| UK | Cavell Close | Telford | Adjacent to Princess Royal Hospital |
| UK | Cavell Drive | Bishops Stortford, Hertfordshire | 51.86674°N 0.17654°E |
| Canada | Cavell Drive | Winnipeg, Manitoba | |
| UK | Cavell Drive | Portsmouth | Queen Alexandra Hospital |
| New Zealand | Cavell Place | Whanganui | |
| UK | Cavell Road | Billericay, Essex | |
| UK | Cavell Road | Dudley, West Midlands | Formerly part of Worcestershire |
| UK | Cavell Road | Norwich | |
| UK | Cavell Street | Whitechapel, London | Formerly known as Bedford Street. It runs next to the London Hospital where Cavell trained. |
| New Zealand | Cavell Street | Dunedin | 45.90052°S 170.51940°E |
| New Zealand | Cavell Street | Reefton | |
| Australia | Cavell Street | West Hobart, Tasmania | Formerly known as Princes Street, renamed 1921. |
| USA | Cavell Street | Westland, Michigan | |
| UK | Cavell Walk | Stevenage | |
| UK | Cavell Way | Maidenbower, Crawley, West Sussex | |
| UK | Cavell Way | Pendleton, Salford, Greater Manchester | |
| Canada | Edith Cavell Boulevard | Port Stanley, Ontario | |
| UK | Edith Cavell Close | Openshaw, Manchester | |
| UK | Edith Cavell Court | Kingston upon Hull | |
| South Africa | Edith Cavell Street | Hillbrow, Johannesburg | 26.19227°S 28.04675°E |
| Mauritius | Edith Cavell Street | Port Louis | 20.16566°S 57.50207°E |
| UK | Edith Cavell Way | Shooter's Hill, London | 51.47201°N 0.04777°E |
| UK | Edith Cavell Way | Steeple Bumpstead | |
| Belgium | Edith Cavellstraat | Ostend | |
| New Zealand | Nurse Cavell Lane | Paparoa, Northland | |
| Portugal | Rua Edith Cavell | Lisbon | 38.733283°N 9.131662°W |
| Portugal | Rua Edith Cavell | Amadora | 38.746813°N 9.229928°W |
| Belgium | Rue Edith Cavell / Edith Cavellstraat | Uccle (Ukkel), Brussels | 50°48′24″N 4°21′26″E |
| France | Rue Edith Cavell | Le Havre | 49.50846°N 0.0842°E |
| France | Rue Edith Cavell | Vitry-sur-Seine | |
| France | Rue Miss Cavell | Arques | |
| France | Rue Miss Edith Cawell | Creil | |

== Schools, houses and school buildings ==
| Country | School | House or building | Location | Notes |
|---|---|---|---|---|
| UK | Crosslee Primary School | Cavell House | Blackley, Manchester | |
| Canada | A middle school | | Windsor, Ontario | Closed in 1987 |
| Canada | An elementary school | | Sault Ste. Marie, Ontario | Later renamed to S.F. Howe |
| UK | Stamford High School | Cavell | Stamford, Lincolnshire | |
| UK | Sheringham High School | Cavell House | Sheringham, Norfolk | Blue house. |
| Jersey | Jersey College for Girls | Cavell House | | Dark blue house |
| India | Pratt Memorial School | Cavell House | Kolkata | Green house |
| India | Queen Mary School | Cavell House | Mumbai | Green house |
| Argentina | Northlands School | Cavell House | Olivos | Founded 1920 |
| UK | Cliff Park Junior School | Cavell House | Gorleston | Red house |
| Australia | St Aidan's Anglican Girls' School | Cavell House | Brisbane | Blue house |
| UK | Cavell Primary School | | Norwich | |
| Canada | Edith Cavell Elementary School | | St. Catharines, Ontario | |
| Canada | Edith Cavell Elementary School | | Vancouver, British Columbia | |
| India | Barnes School | Edith Cavell House | Deolali | Green house |
| UK | Rugby High School for Girls | Edith Cavell House | Rugby | House abolished after 1979. |
| UK | Edith Cavell Lower School | | Bedford | |
| Canada | Edith Cavell School | | Moncton, New Brunswick | |
| UK | Wymondham College | a boarding block | Norfolk | |
| UK | Edith Cavell Secondary School | | Hackney, London | |
| UK | Abbeydale Grammar School for Girls | Cavell House | Sheffield | |
| Jamaica | St. Andrew High School for Girls | Cavell House | Saint Andrew | School house, denoted by the colour red. |

== Other ==
| Country | Name | Location | Notes |
|---|---|---|---|
| Canada | Mount Edith Cavell | One Dollar postage stamp | Printed by British American Bank Note Company, December 4, 1930 (Scott: #177) |
| UK | Cavell Gardens | Inverness | Cavell Gardens War memorial named in 1922, with new memorial stone added 2015 |
| Venus | Cavell Corona | Lat 38.3, Long 18.8 | A geological feature on the planet |
| UK | Car park | Queensgate shopping centre, Peterborough | One of four car parks in the centre. During refurbishment in 2011 plans to drop the names of all four car parks and refer only to them by colour (Cavell being "blue") resulted in a public backlash and the names being retained. |
| UK | Cavell House | Clevedon, Somerset | Where she spent some of her childhood, now a guest house. |
| UK | Cavell House | 26, College Road, Norwich | Where her parents lived in retirement |
| USA | Cavell Park | Northeast Minneapolis, Minnesota | A playground. |
| New Zealand | Edith Cavell Bridge | Shotover River, Otago region | The bridge, opened in 1919, was unofficially named by a person who lived in a hut nearby. Whilst the local council did not agree with the naming, the name stuck and the bridge has since been known by this name |
| USA | Edith Cavell Chapter of the Daughters of the British Empire | Houston, Texas | |
| UK | The Edith Cavell | Tombland, Norwich | public house |
| UK | The Cavell Van | | The passenger luggage van that transported her remains from Dover to London during her repatriation. |
| | Miss Edith Cavell | | A variety of rose first bred in 1917 |
| Canada | Mount Edith Cavell | Alberta | A peak in the Canadian Rockies, named for her in 1916 |
| UK | Radio Cavell | Oldham | A hospital radio station at the Royal Oldham Hospital |
| USA | YWCA Camp Cavell | Lexington, Michigan | |
| UK | Edith Cavell Projectile Factory | Overnewton, Glasgow | |
| France, Belgium | Girl's name | | Edith became a popular name for French and Belgian girls after her execution. The French chanteuse Édith Piaf (1915–1963), born two months after Cavell was executed, was the best known of these. |
| USA | Racehorse Edith Cavell | | Mare sired by Man o' War out of The Nurse. Foaled in 1923, Edith Cavell won the 1926 Coaching Club American Oaks and also defeated male horses in other stakes events. |
