= Elsie Bertram =

English publishers' distributor (1912–2003)

Elsie Bertram MBE
- Born: Elsie Hacking; 12 June 1912; Norton on Tees, County Durham, England
- Died: 26 October 2003 (aged 91); Norwich, Norfolk, England
- Citizenship: United Kingdom
- Occupation: Wholesale publishers' bookseller
- Years active: 1955–1999
- Spouse: Edward Bertram (m. 1935–1987)
- Children: 2

Elsie Bertram MBE (née Hacking; 6 June 1912 – 26 October 2003) was an English wholesale publishers' bookseller and philanthropist who co-founded the Bertrams books wholesaler in 1968. She became wholesale distributor for Pan Paperbacks in East Anglia in 1965 before going on to obtain a contract to accommodate a children's book list from Hamlyn three years later. Bertram setup Bertrams with her oldest son that same year and she was credited with significantly helping improve the distribution of books across the United Kingdom. She established the Norfolk Diabetes Appeal in 1987 and did a significant amount of fundraising for the appeal, funding a diabetic unit for West Norwich Hospital and a specialist eye clinic centre. The annual Elsie Bertram Memorial Lecture is named in her memory.

== Early life ==
On 6 June 1912, Bertram was born in Norton on Tees in County Durham, England. She was the daughter of a Lancastrian cattle medicine seller. Bertram's father sent her to a private school, earning a scholarship to go on and study at Stockton-on-Tees High School. She did not excel at school, but won a sack race for which she received a prize presented to her by the local Member of Parliament Harold Macmillan. Upon leaving education, Bertram obtained employment as a clerical officer in the statistics office of ICI. She married fellow ICI employee Edward Bertram in 1935 and relocated to King's Lynn in Norfolk, East Anglia before the start of the Second World War. The couple had two children; two other children born to them died in the early stages of infancy. When Bertram's husband joined the Army Intelligence, she took over his farming agency which sold farm medicines, and was a volunteer relief ambulance driver for the St John Ambulance Brigade. She won an award for her ambulance service. In 1950, the family moved to Norwich and Bertram found work raising chickens from the sheds in her back garden.

== Publishing and fundraising career ==
Bertram was made wholesale distributor for Pan Paperbacks in East Anglia in 1965. She warehoused the books in her chicken sheds, and was able to increase the company turnover before adding a second shed to accommodate the children's book list from Hamlyn. Bertram had obtained the contract after going to Hamlyn when she noticed customers were able to sell more books from a bigger range. The Bertram family became Hamlyn's wholesale supplier to the retailers of Norfolk to help the company supply a large quantity of publications to the county following union troubles at its Rushden warehouse in late 1968. She and her oldest son Kip went on to establish Bertrams with a small amount of money in 1968 and obtained rented space in exchange for the sale of the chicken sheds. Bertram established the company headquarters at The Nest on Rosary Road above the River Wensum, a former site where Norwich City F.C. played football matches.

According to The Times, she "had an easy and agreeable style, stemming from a genuine northern friendliness. Not only could she charm the birds from the trees, but she could wean publishers off their established discount terms -they actually did come round to paying the price of wholesale distribution." Bertram worked 12-hour shifts, arriving at her desk in the early morning to read the post and stayed there until the early evening. She did not tolerate neither unions or computerisation but was able to take on personal criticisms of the business as well as failures in sorting accounts on time. Within months of Bertrams founding, the company became one of Britain's primary book wholesellers, adding internet suppliers to their clients in her final years. She sold the company for £50 million in 1999; at the time of sale, there were 750 staff and an annual turnover of approximately £70 million.

In 1987, she established the Norfolk Diabetes Appeal with £120,000 coming from her pension fund; her two children were diabetic. Bertram fundraised £1 million for the diabetic unit of the West Norwich Hospital and the specialist eye clinic centre (now known as the Elsie Bertram Diabetes Centre since her death to recognise her charitable contributions) opened in 1991 by Charles, Prince of Wales. She held a half-price sale of damage books every six months at the Norwich warehouse and proceeds were donated to the Norfolk Diabetes Appeal. She later sold a sprout given to her by Charles at the opening of the diabetes centre in 1991 for £1,000 and gave it to the appeal. Bertram was also a fervent supporter of the friends of Norwich Cathedral.

== Personal life and death ==
In 1987, she was appointed Member of the Order of the British Empire "for services to the book trade." Bertram's husband predeceased her in the same year. On 26 October 2003, she died in Norwich. Bertram was given a private funeral and a memorial service was held in honour of her life at Norwich Cathedral at noon on 21 November.

== Legacy ==
Although she admitted to not be a reader, she was credited for playing a major role in improving the distribution of books across the United Kingdom. The Elsie Bertram Memorial Lecture held at the John Innes Conference Centre every year since 2004 was set up in her name and "commemorates the very significant contribution the late Mrs Elsie Bertram MBE made to diabetes services in Norfolk". The Elsie Bertram Award to the Sales Person of the Year was presented at the British Book Awards just once in 2004.
