= West Town, Peterborough =

Residential area of Peterborough, England

Coordinates: 52°34′33″N 0°15′36″W

West Town is residential area of the city of Peterborough, in the ceremonial county of Cambridgeshire, England. For electoral purposes it forms part of Peterborough West ward.

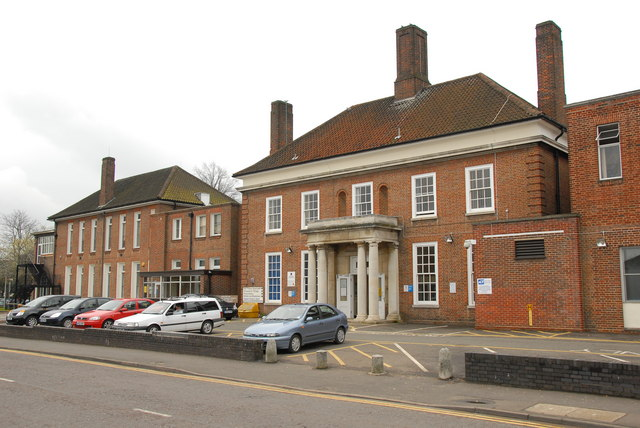
The Memorial Hospital (1928), Midland Road, Peterborough.

The Memorial Hospital, built by public subscription and donation on Midland Road in 1928, was transferred to the National Health Service in 1948, coming under No. 12 Group (Peterborough and Stamford) Hospital Management Committee of the East Anglian Regional Hospital Board. The neo-Georgian hospital (latterly the Memorial Wing) was enlarged by the massive addition of Peterborough District Hospital, built in continuous phases between 1960 and 1968.

In 2010, as part of the £300 million Greater Peterborough health investment plan, the city's two hospitals transferred to a single site on the grounds of the former Edith Cavell Hospital in Westwood. The 22 acre (8.9 ha) site, now known as the Hospital Quarter, is currently proposed for redevelopment.

The Dairy Crest depot, formerly the co-operative Anglia Dairies, is also based on Midland Road. West Town County Primary opened on Williamson Avenue in 1909, originally an Infant then Junior Mixed and Infant school; secondary pupils attend nearby Jack Hunt School in Netherton.

West Town School relocated to new premises on the site of the former Memorial Hospital in 2016. The hospital's facade was retained as a lasting memorial to those of the city and the 6th Northamptonshire Regiment who died in the first world war. The stone porch has a plain frieze and moulded cornice supported on paired doric columns; an inscription above the doors to the entrance lobby reads IN REMEMBRANCE 1914–1918.

== See also ==
- Peterborough District Hospital
