= Colchester Hospital =

- East Suffolk and North Essex NHS Foundation Trust
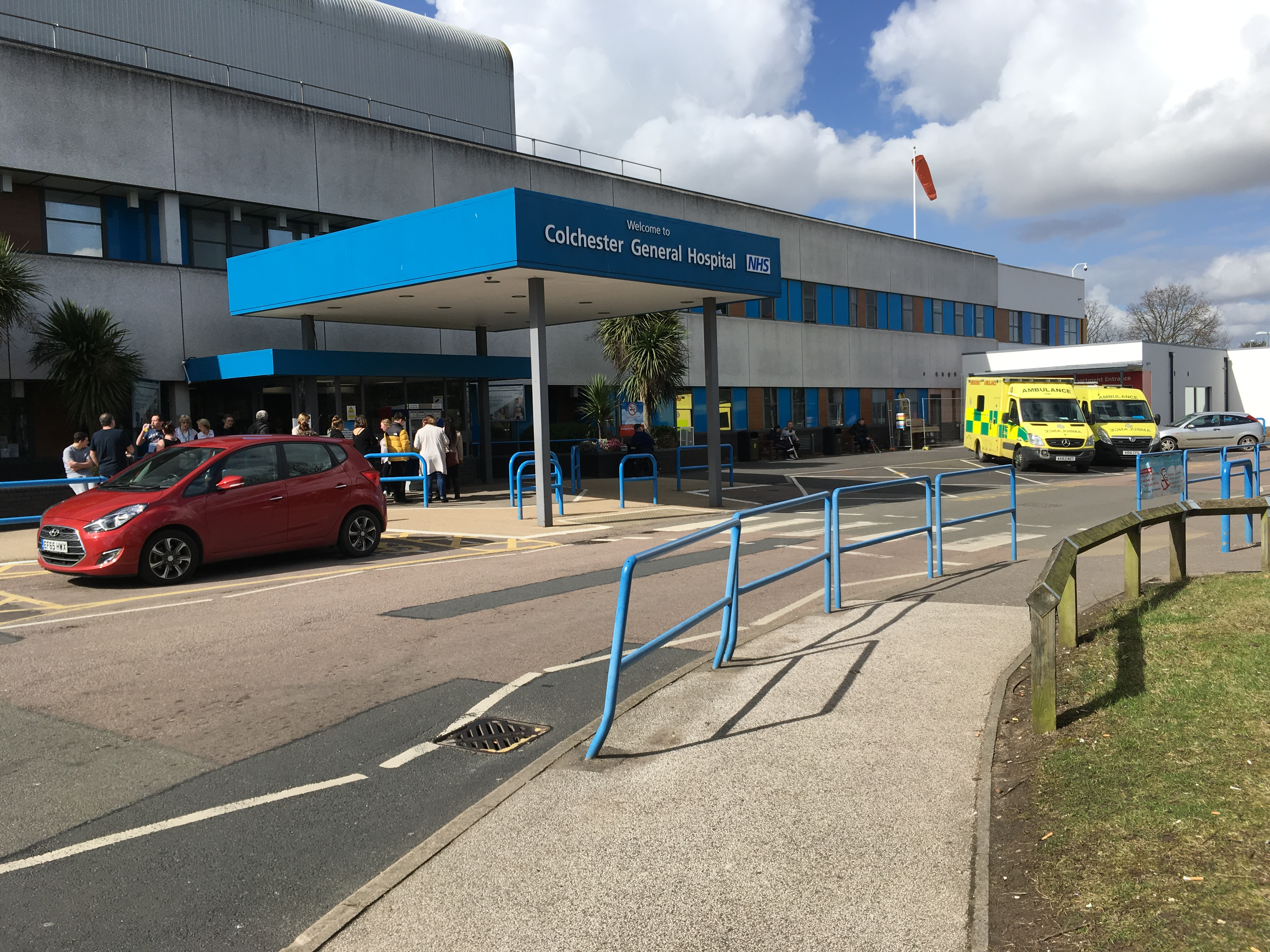
- Main entrance

- Shown in Essex

Geography
- Location: Colchester, Essex, England
- Coordinates: 51.9099°N 0.8992°E

Organisation
- Care system: National Health Service
- Type: General
- Affiliated university: Barts and The London School of Medicine and Dentistry; Norwich Medical School; Anglia Ruskin University

Services
- Emergency department: Yes
- Beds: 763

Helipads
- Helipad: Yes

History
- Founded: 1985

Links
- Website: www.esneft.nhs.uk/your-visit/getting-here/how-to-get-to-colchester-hospital/

Colchester Hospital is a district general hospital located in Colchester, Essex. It is managed by East Suffolk and North Essex NHS Foundation Trust.

== History ==
The hospital, then named Colchester District General Hospital, was opened by Queen Elizabeth II on 20 May 1985. At the time, it had nine wards and 283 beds, built in groups around landscaped courtyards.

The hospital has been expanded a number of times since its opening, and several new buildings have been added. This includes the Gainsborough wing, which opened in 2000.

In 2014, the trust announced that the nearby Essex County Hospital was due to close, and that some services currently provided there would transfer to Colchester General Hospital, including breast services and nuclear medicine. In preparation for this, construction began on a new diagnostic imaging centre, which opened in 2018, in time for the transfer of services. It houses three MRI scanners, one of which is wide bore, as well a PET-CT scanner, which will also be used by patients from the Ipswich and Chelmsford areas.

In 2014, the hospital was referred to as "the worst in England" by Health Secretary Jeremy Hunt.

In 2019, plans were approved to rebuild and extend the main entrance of the hospital. The Accident & Emergency department will also be expanded, and the narrow bridge across the lake in front of the hospital will also be replaced with a wider structure.

On the weekend of 2–3 January 2021 hospital security removed people who were taking pictures of hospital corridors and posting them to social media. East Suffolk and North Essex NHS Foundation Trust chief executive Nick Hulme said that it "beggars belief" that some people were calling the pandemic a hoax. He said that hospital security had to "remove people who were taking photographs of empty corridors and then posting them on social media, saying the hospital is not in crisis".

== Facilities ==
The hospital has a helipad, used by air ambulances and for military training.

== Teaching ==
The hospital serves as a teaching hospital for medical students from Barts and The London School of Medicine and Dentistry and Norwich Medical School.

== Transport ==
Local bus route 8, operated by Arriva, and 51, 52 and 68, operated by First, serve the hospital, with a bus stop located outside the main entrance. There is also a Park and Ride service, run by Essex County Council.

The nearest railway station is Colchester on the Great Eastern Main Line, located 1.0 miles from the hospital.
