= William Newman (surgeon) =

English surgeon

William Newman (29 August 1833 – 3 December 1903) was an English surgeon who worked at the Stamford and Rutland Infirmary (now the Stamford and Rutland Hospital) for 40 years and had significant input into the design of the Infirmary's fever wards in the late 1870s.

== Biography ==
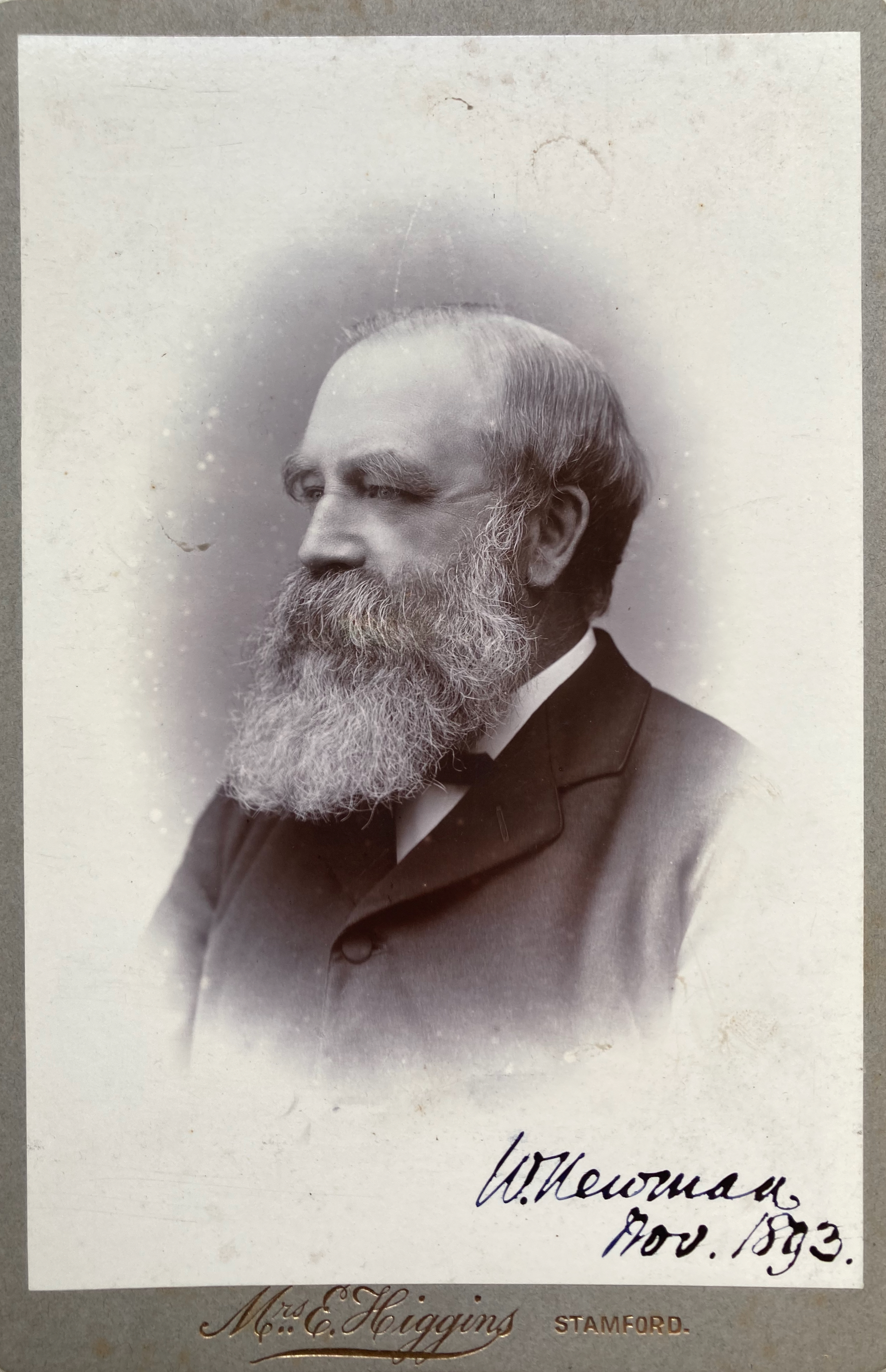
William Newman in 1893. Photographed by Stamford photographer Mrs E. Higgins.

Newman was born in Sheffield on 29 August 1833 the son of Robert Newman. He trained in medicine at St Bartholomew's Hospital in London, later qualifying as an M.D., M.R.C.P. and F.R.C.S. He held surgical positions at the Shrewsbury Hospital, Ancaster and Fulbeck in Lincolnshire. In 1862, he settled in Stamford where he was in general practice and surgeon at the Stamford and Rutland General Infirmary for 30 years. After retirement, he remained as Consulting Surgeon for another 10 years.

In his surgery, he was an early practitioner of antiseptic and aseptic surgery and a specialist in abdominal surgery and used x-rays for diagnostic purposes. He pioneered sanitation and published several works on surgery and public health following outbreaks of typhoid and scarlet fever in Stamford between 1868 and 1870.

Newman's publication History of Stamford, Rutland and general infirmary outlined the design and construction of the new fever wards. He had significant input into the design of the wards alongside the architect Edward Browning. In 1876 he and Browning led the Infirmary's building committee producing plans for three new fever wards to be built as part of the Infirmary and not as separate hospitals; each block contained a square-shaped five-bed ward with beds around the walls. Other design features credited to Newman included bathrooms and toilets opening off cross-ventilated lobbies, damp-proof courses, cellars, hot-air heating and ventilation, glazed brick interior walls and the use of glazed tile pictures. The wards opened in January 1879.

Apart from his medical practice he was a governor of Epsom College, a justice of the peace and served on the council of the Obstetrical Society of London and as vice-president of the surgical section of the British Medical Association.

Newman died on 3 December 1903 at the Stamford Infirmary.

== Family ==
Newman's son Lieutenant Colonel E. A. R. Newman, who had served in the Indian Medical Service, was the first ophthalmologic surgeon at the Infirmary from 1925 until his retirement in 1935.

== Selected works ==
- Newman, W. (1868). The drainage and water supply of towns: a lecture delivered at the Stamford Institution, March 17th, 1868. Simpkin, Marshall, and Co. OCLC 754101725.
- Newman, William (1869). Address delivered at the annual meeting of the South Midland Branch of the British Medical Association, June 29th 1869. Stamford: Langley.
- Newman, William (1870). Notes on the Sanitary State of Stamford. Stamford: Henry Johnson. OCLC 562373607 – via Google Books.
- Newman, William (1870). Six cases of lithotomy, under care in the Stamford Infirmary. Saint Bartholomew's Hospital Reports.
- Newman, William (1874). How to Make Home Healthy; or the Sanitary Needs of a Dwelling-House. A Lecture, Etc. Stamford.
- Newman, William (1880). Healthy Homes; or, the Sanitary Needs of a Dwelling-House. Stamford: Jenkinson & Sons. OCLC 54340841.
- Newman, W. (1881). Surgical cases, mainly from the wards of the Stamford, Rutland & General Infirmary. Lewis.
- Newman, William (1886). Address. Stamford: Jenkinson & Son.
