= West Suffolk Hospital =

- West Suffolk NHS Foundation Trust
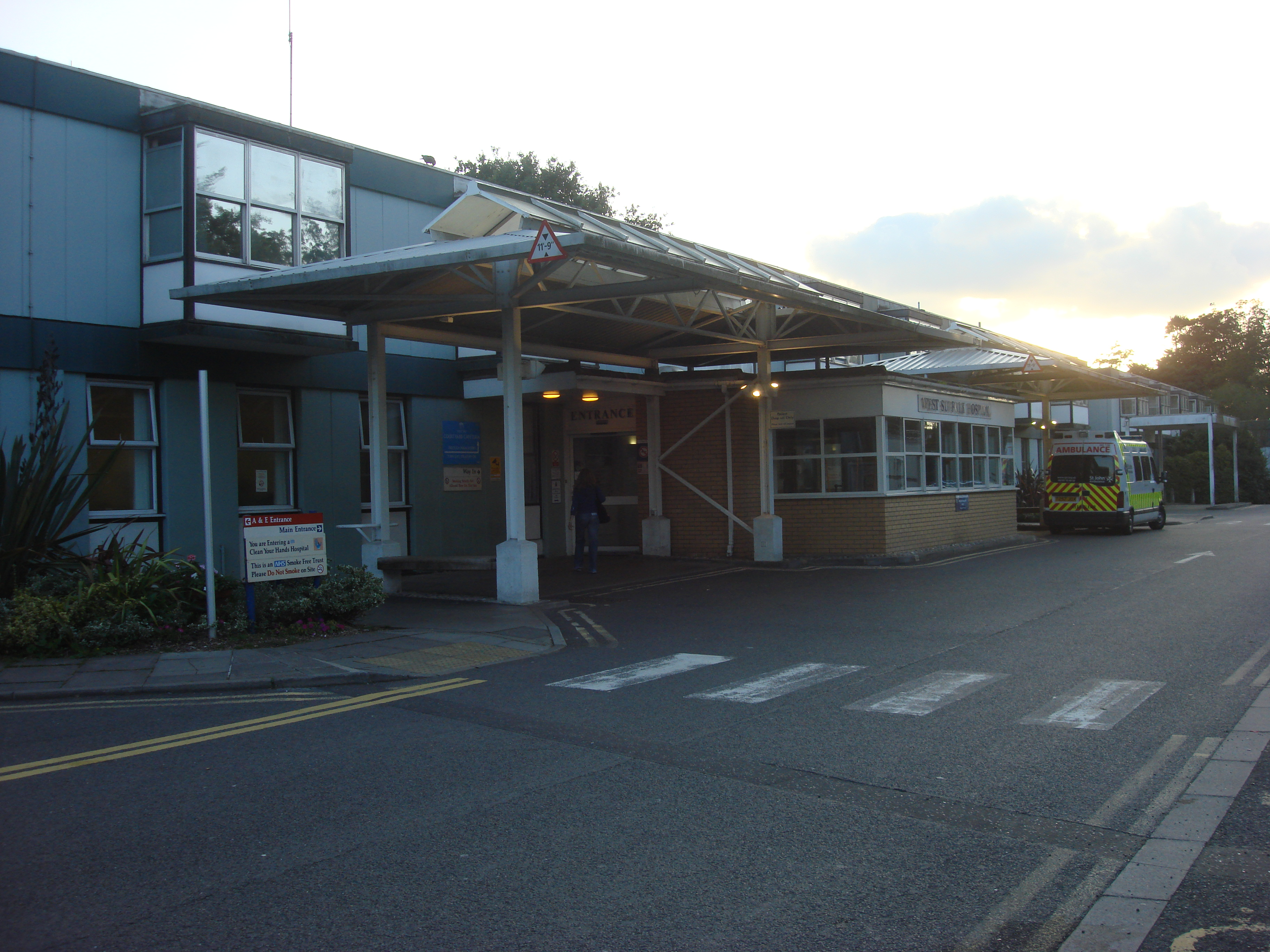
- Main entrance

- Shown in Suffolk

Geography
- Location: Hardwick Lane, Bury St Edmunds, Suffolk, England
- Coordinates: 52.2316°N 0.7092°E

Organisation
- Care system: National Health Service
- Type: General

Services
- Emergency department: Yes
- Beds: 430 (approx)

History
- Founded: 1973

Links
- Website: www.wsh.nhs.uk/Patients-and-visitors/Information-for-visitors/Getting-here.aspx
- Lists: Hospitals in England

West Suffolk Hospital is a small district general hospital in Bury St Edmunds, England. It is managed by the West Suffolk NHS Foundation Trust.

== History ==
The hospital was built in a former Ordnance Depot in Hospital Road in Bury St Edmunds. It was opened as the Bury and Suffolk General Hospital on 4 January 1825. It was extended in 1861 and balconies were added in 1908. It became the Suffolk General Hospital in 1902 and the West Suffolk General Hospital in 1929.

After joining the National Health Service in 1948, it moved to Hardwick Lane in Bury St Edmunds in 1973. The hospital received extensive publicity when Myra Hindley, the Moors murderer, died there in November 2002. The Marquess of Bristol, whose former home was Ickworth House near Bury St Edmunds, opened a new Friends of the Hospital shop in June 2013.

== Services ==
The hospital provides accident & emergency, maternity, oncology and palliative care services.

== Investigation into anonymous letters ==
After a member of staff had written anonymously to the family of Susan Warby, a patient who had died whilst under treatment at the hospital, staff were asked to provide handwriting samples and fingerprints to a serious incident enquiry. Senior staff expressed serious concerns that these efforts to identify a whistleblower might inhibit the future reporting of safety issues. At an inquest into the death which commenced at Suffolk Coroner's Court on 16 January 2020, the coroner called for a police investigation into the death. Matt Hancock, the Secretary of State for Health and Social Care requested an independent review into the treatment of whistleblowers at West Suffolk Hospital. The inquest concluded in September 2020 making serious criticisms of the management of the Intensive Care Unit.

The family of Horace Nunn also received an anonymous letter after Nunn died following suboptimal care at West Suffolk Hospital. The hospital had not told the family about problems with Nunn's care before a whistleblower sent them a letter. A whistleblower alleges a doctor involved in Nunn's care had previously endangered patients by injecting himself with drugs while on duty. Investigation and disciplining of possible whistleblowers is still continuing.

== Performance ==
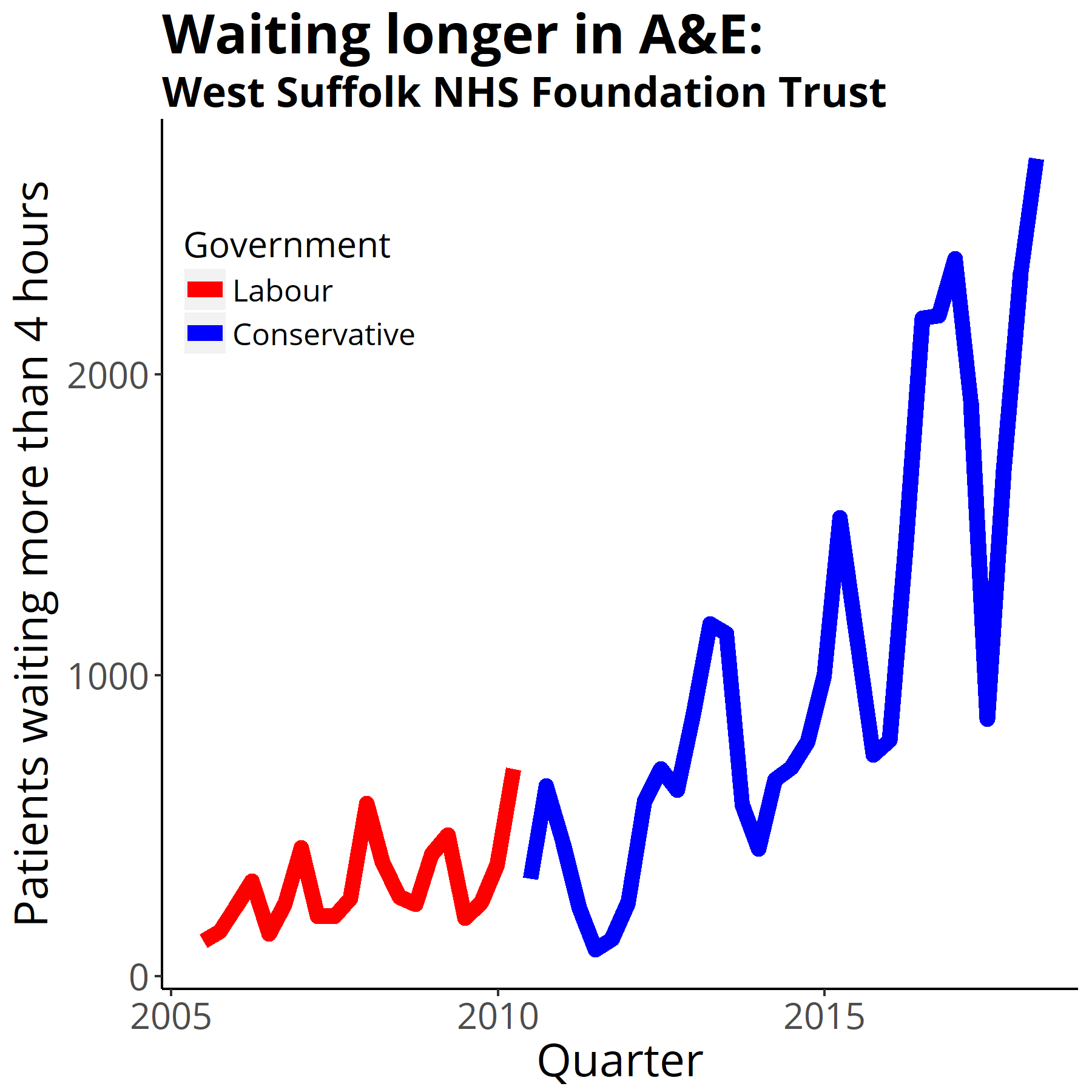
Four-hour target in the emergency department quarterly figures from NHS England Data from https://www.england.nhs.uk/statistics/statistical-work-areas/ae-waiting-times-and-activity/

In January 2018 the hospital was rated outstanding by the Care Quality Commission, one of only seven general hospitals in England awarded the highest possible rating. The end-of-life service in particular was praised.

The Care Quality Commission conducted an inspection of West Suffolk Hospital between September and October 2019. The inspection's report was published on 30 January 2020, within which the hospital's rating had reduced by two grades to 'Requires improvement'. The components of the new grading comprised 'Good' for its 'effective and caring', and 'Requires improvement' for its 'responsive', 'well-led', and 'safe' categories. The CQC's specific areas of concern comprised the hospital's culture, organisational responsiveness, and maternity services.

== Renovation/Replacement ==
In August 2021, it was revealed that RAAC was used in the construction of the building, leading to concerns over public safety and the need for ongoing maintenance work costing over £70m, including spending tens of millions of pounds on a lattice structure to catch any falling concrete planks. Steve Barclay, then Secretary of State for Health and Social Care named West Suffolk Hospital, along with six other hospitals built using RAAC, as "not safe to operate beyond 2030".

The West Suffolk NHS Foundation sought an upgrade to the hospital, as the original buildings have long passed their intended 30 year lifespan, and in 2019 funding was announced to allow planning to begin. The new hospital will be built on the 70 acres (28 ha) grounds of Hardwick House with plans to incorporate existing buildings into the new complex.
