= Cambridgeshire and Peterborough NHS Foundation Trust =

NHS foundation trust

- Type: NHS foundation trust; Mental health trust
- Established: 1 June 2008
- Headquarters: Fulbourn Hospital, Fulbourn
- Region served: Cambridgeshire
- Chair: Elieen Milner
- Chief executive: Steve Grange
- Website: www.cpft.nhs.uk

Cambridgeshire and Peterborough NHS Foundation Trust (CPFT) provides community, mental health and learning disability services in Cambridgeshire, England. The trust provides specialist services across the east of England and across Britain.

== History ==
The Trust became a Foundation Trust in June 2008. In 2010, eighty of the Trust's patients were in private beds, mostly out of the area. The trust began to use an intensive three day assessment period, and invested more in supporting people in their own homes in order to avoid the need for institutional admission.

In 2018 the trust sold its 'Ida Darwin Unit' based in Cambridge and the 'Gloucester Centre' based in Peterborough to Homes England for £20 million.

In March 2024, the Care Quality Commission issued the 'requires improvement' rating regarding wards treating adults in mental health crisis. The Trust continued to faced ongoing challenges with waiting lists "despite concerted efforts" in March 2025.

=== UnitingCare Partnership ===
The Trust was part of the UnitingCare Partnership with Cambridge University Hospitals NHS Foundation Trust. Cambridgeshire and Peterborough Clinical Commissioning Group announced in September 2014 that the partnership was the preferred bidder for a pioneering £800 million contract to deliver older people's services in Cambridgeshire with effect from April 2015. The plan was for a single lead provider which will be responsible for older people's healthcare services and adult community health services, ensuring that care is more joined up than it has been, with a focus on improving the patient experience. In April 2015 the trust took on 1,360 staff formerly employed by Cambridgeshire Community Services NHS Trust following the success of the Partnership's bid.

In an article in National Health Executive magazine on 15 September 2016, CPFT CEO Aidan Thomas is reported to have told the Public Accounts Committee: "We bid as low as we thought we could reasonably do," ...."There was pressure in the system at the time to get the whole thing going," he said. "There was a need for the economy to deal with its financial problems and this contract, if it had been allowed to work, should have dealt with some of that."

== Services ==
The Trust's services cover three main areas:

- Older people's and adult community services
- Adult and specialist mental health
- Children, young people and families

The Trust supports around 100,000 people each year and employs more than 4,000 staff. Its largest bases are at the Cavell Centre, Peterborough, and Fulbourn Hospital, but its staff are based in over 90 locations.

The trust provides physical health checks and mental health therapy at Clare Lodge in Peterborough, an all-female welfare-only secure home - the UK's only children's home of its type.

== See also ==
- List of NHS trusts
- Healthcare in Cambridgeshire
