= Bertrams =

British book reseller

Bertram Trading Limited
- Company type: Limited company
- Industry: Book publishing
- Founded: 1971; 55 years ago
- Founder: Elsie Bertram; Kip Bertram
- Headquarters: Norwich, U.K.
- Key people: Mark Garrard
- Services: Bookseller
- Total assets: l
- Number of employees: 400
- Parent: Bertram Group
- Website: www.bertrams.com

Bertram Trading Limited, commonly referred to as Bertrams, was the second largest United Kingdom based wholesaler of books, owned since 2018 by Aurelius Investments. It had 200,000 titles available for same-day despatch and had access to over 13 million books in print. The group included Bertram Books, Bertram Publisher Services and Bertram Library Services.

The company was founded in 1971 by Elsie Bertram and her son Kip, based on a business which Elsie had been running since 1965 in a chicken shed in the garden of her Norwich home. It had and independent booksellers as its core customers.

Bertrams was bought by Woolworths Group in 2007. The acquisition was reviewed by the Competition Commission.

The retail business of Woolworths Group and its distribution firm Entertainment UK entered administration in November 2008, although Bertrams did not as it operated as a separate division within the group. Woolworths Group entered into administration itself in January 2009.

Bertrams entered administration on 20 March 2009 and sold on the same day by Ernst & Young in a "pre-pack" deal to Smiths News (now Connect Group) for £8,611,622. It was sold by Connect Group in 2018 and entered administration again on 19 June 2020.

As of June 2020, many of the suppliers remain unpaid. Galley Beggar Press, based in Norwich, is owed £7,000, and its co-founder Sam Jordison said Bertrams has "quite a lot of stock of ours - we have printed the books, but don't know if we can get hold of them".

== See also ==
- List of book distributors
