= Norwich Community Hospital =

- Norfolk Community Health and Care NHS Trust
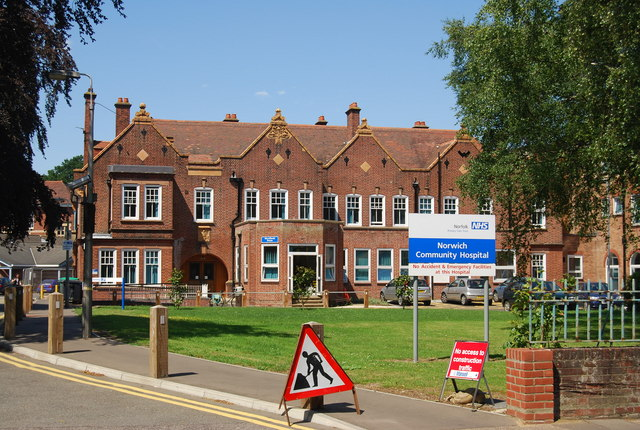
- Woodlands House, part of Norwich Community Hospital

- Location in Norfolk

Geography
- Location: Bowthorpe Road, Norwich, Norfolk, England
- Coordinates: 52.6342°N 1.2603°E

Organisation
- Care system: NHS
- Type: Community

History
- Founded: 1859

Links
- Website: www.norfolkcommunityhealthandcare.nhs.uk

Norwich Community Hospital is a healthcare facility in Bowthorpe Road, Norwich, Norfolk, England. It is managed by Norfolk Community Health and Care NHS Trust. It was known until 2005 as the West Norwich Hospital.

== History ==
The facility has its origins in the Bowthorpe Road Workhouse which was completed in 1859. An infirmary was added in around 1880 and a nurses' home (which survives as Woodlands House) was completed in 1903. It became the Bowthorpe Road Public Assistance Institution in 1930 and, although the main building was destroyed by bombing during the Baedeker Blitz of the Second World War, the hospital joined the National Health Service as the West Norwich Hospital in 1948. After a programme of investment it became the Norwich Community Hospital in 2005.
