= Greyfriars, Stamford =

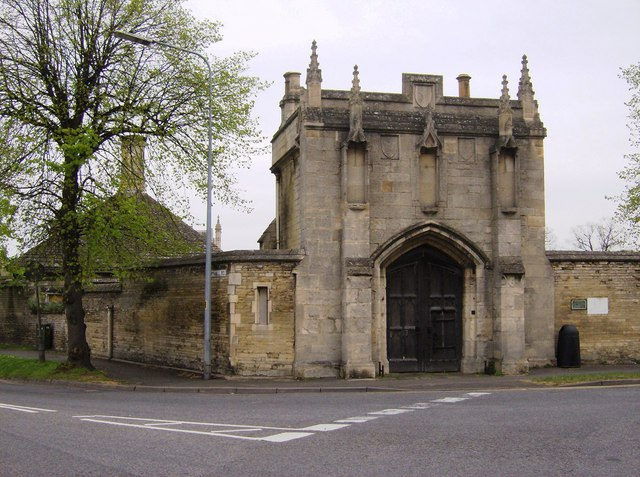
- The surviving 14th-century gatehouse to the medieval friary
- Interactive map of Greyfriars, Stamford
- 52°39′17.9″N 0°28′11.9″W
- Type: Friary
- Location: Stamford, Lincolnshire, England

History
- Built: Friary prior to c. 1230; Gatehouse (extant) early 14th century

Scheduled monument
- Official name: Whitefriars Gate
- Reference no.: 1005006

Greyfriars, Stamford was a Franciscan friary in Stamford, Lincolnshire, England. It was one of many religious houses suppressed and closed during the Dissolution of the Monasteries in the 16th century. The site is now part of the NHS Stamford and Rutland Hospital.

== History ==
Records show that a friary had been established prior to 1230 because on 13 January 1229-30, Henry III made a grant of fuel to the religious community. Several notable people were buried at Greyfriars these include Joan of Kent, wife of the Black Prince, who was buried in 1385 at the Greyfriars beside her first husband, Thomas Holland, 1st Earl of Kent, as requested in her will. Blanche of Lancaster, Baroness Wake of Liddell, the wife of the powerful Lincolnshire Lord Thomas Wake, 2nd Baron Wake of Liddell was buried in the friary church 1380.

After Richard, Duke of York was killed at the Battle of Wakefield in 1460 during the Wars of the Roses, his body was exhumed in 1476 by his son, Edward IV. The elaborate funeral cortège travelled from Pontefract Castle to a new tomb at Fotheringhay. En route the hearse spent two nights at the Greyfriars church.

== Demise ==
During the English Reformation, the Friary was suppressed as part of the Dissolution of the monasteries in 1534. It was surrendered in 1538.

In November 1551, Mary of Guise, the mother of Mary, Queen of Scots, travelled from London to Scotland. She was lodged at the house of the Duchess of Suffolk in the Greyfriar's at Stamford on 20 November. Elizabeth I stayed for a night on 5 August 1566 because one of William Cecil's daughters at Burghley had measles, before travelling on to Grimsthorpe Castle.

== Later use ==
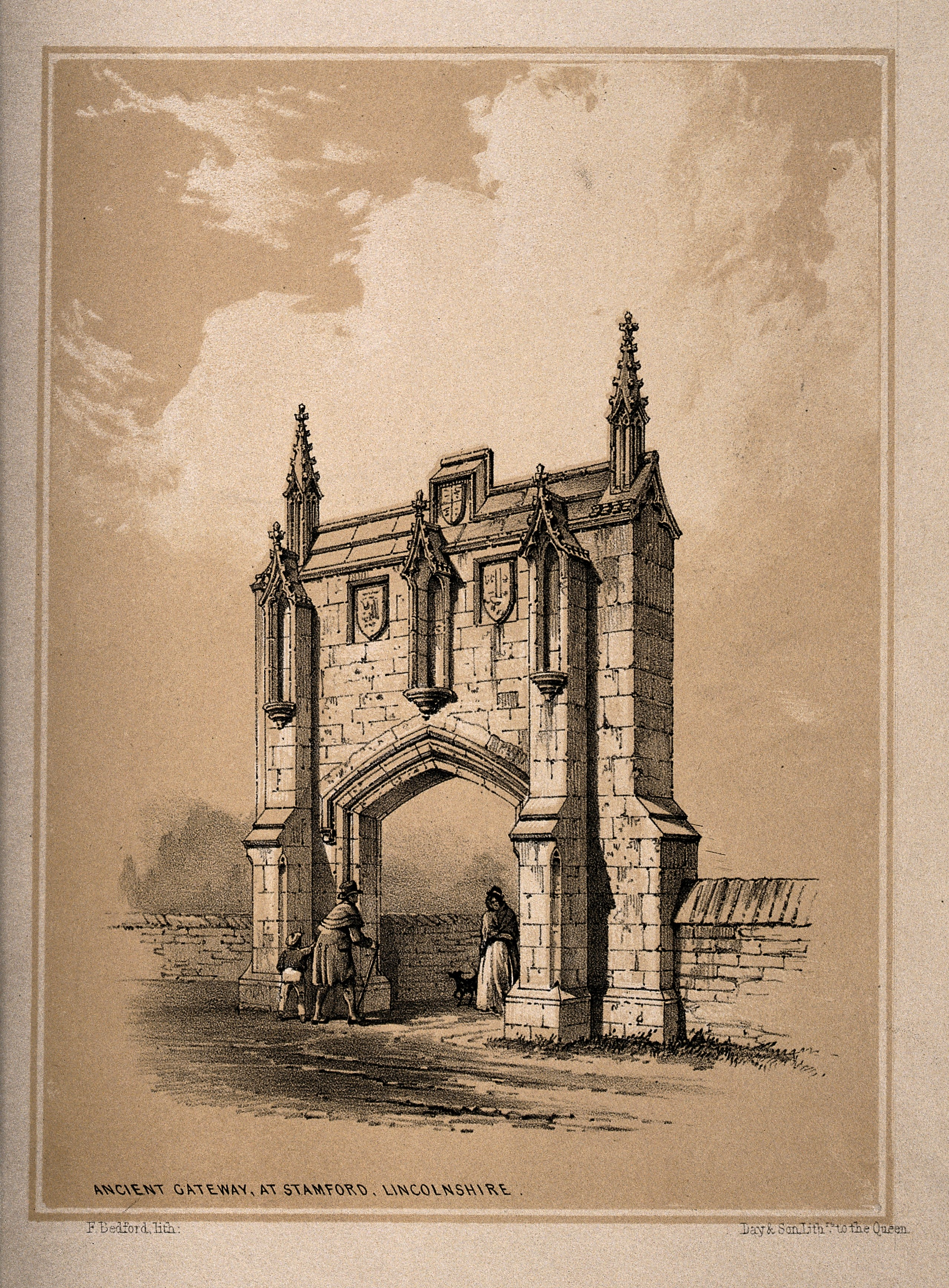
Tinted lithograph of the gateway by Francis Bedford

In 1828 Stamford and Rutland Infirmary was built on the site of the Friary. It is now Stamford and Rutland Hospital.

The only surviving structure from the medieval friary is the 14th-century gateway known as the "Whitefriars gatehouse"; however academic research now suggests it was a Franciscan friary not one of the Carmelite Order. It was built of Barnack limestone in the second quarter of the 14th century. The gateway is on the Heritage at Risk Register; repairs have been carried out but there are no current plans for the building.

== See also ==
- St Leonard's Priory, Stamford
