= Stamford and Rutland Hospital =

- North West Anglia NHS Foundation Trust
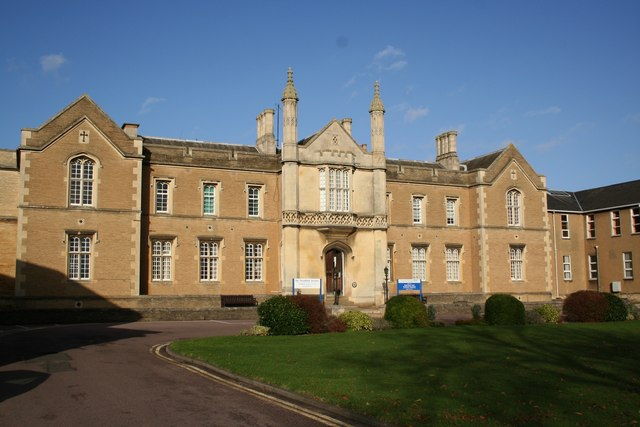
- Stamford and Rutland Hospital

- Shown in Lincolnshire

Geography
- Location: Stamford, Lincolnshire, England, United Kingdom
- Coordinates: 52.655159°N 0.4718503°W

Organisation
- Care system: Public NHS
- Type: Community

Services
- Emergency department: No Accident & Emergency
- Beds: 22

Links
- Website: www.nwangliaft.nhs.uk/our-hospitals/stamford-and-rutland-hospital/
- Lists: Hospitals in England

Stamford and Rutland Hospital is an elective care hospital in Stamford, Lincolnshire, administered by North West Anglia NHS Foundation Trust. The Stamford and Rutland Infirmary opened in 1828.

== History ==
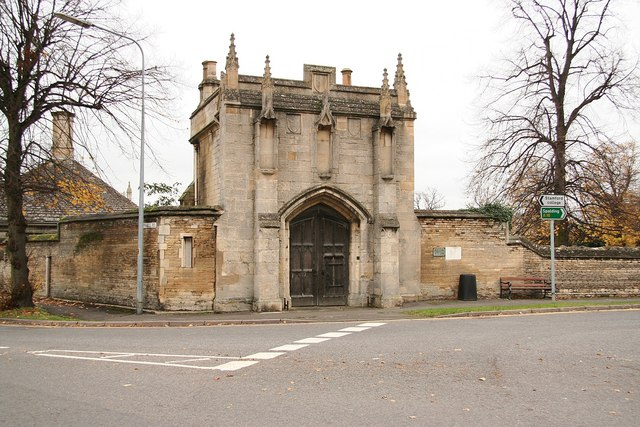
The medieval gate of Greyfriars, Stamford is a scheduled monument

The Stamford and Rutland Infirmary was built on a site previously occupied by Greyfriars, Stamford and donated by the Marquess of Exeter. It was funded by a bequest from the will of surgeon Henry Fryer, designed by John Peter Gandy and opened in 1828.

Between 1876 and 1879 the hospital was expanded with the addition of three fever ward blocks, under architect Edward Browning with input from surgeon William Newman. The wards incorporated a number of features such as centralised ward interiors and glazed internal walling, and were cited as an exemplar of single-block planning for small hospitals, particularly by Henry Burdett. The fever wards are Grade II listed and show how voluntary hospitals dealt with 19th-century epidemics of contagious disease. The picture tiles in the fever wards, depicting the four seasons, are one of the earliest examples of the use of such tiles in hospitals. One set of tiled pictures has been removed and restored and is displayed in the entrance to the new Day Treatment Unit.

A substantial redevelopment of the hospital was completed in July 2017, which included new imaging facilities, including a permanent MRI scanning suite, and cancer treatment facilities.

== Services ==
The hospital provides a minor injuries unit, large scale outpatient services and day-case surgery, with the largest pain management centre in the region. It also has a medicine for the elderly ward with 22 intermediate care beds. The trust's largest hospital, Peterborough City Hospital, provides the majority of emergency and inpatient services in the area; the two together thus provide a comprehensive suite of services in a predominantly "hot" and "cold" split. It was rated "good" by the Care Quality Commission in May 2014.
