= UnitingCare Partnership =

UnitingCare Partnership was a limited liability partnership formed by Cambridgeshire and Peterborough NHS Foundation Trust and Cambridge University Hospitals NHS Foundation Trust

== Bid award ==
The partnership was selected as the preferred bidder by NHS Cambridgeshire and Peterborough Clinical Commissioning Group as Lead Provider of older people's healthcare and adult community services, able to integrate services, with the intention providing more joined-up care for patients. This decision came after a 15-month service design and procurement process and the partnership started delivering services on 1 April 2015. Commonly NHS contracts are just one or two years in length. This contract was to be a five-year contract.

Julian Huppert, MP for Cambridge, welcomed the news that the new combined services for elderly people will be run by the NHS. He said he wanted services to stay in the NHS, where the quality of health care is prioritised, as opposed to provision by private companies who have an obligation to generate a profit for their shareholders.

== Criticism of bidding process ==
The process of awarding the £800 million contract was criticised by campaigning group Stop the NHS Sell-Off, which was supported by 38 Degrees, who said the process cost £1 million.

The organisation planned to provide:

- new neighbourhood teams to bring together community health, mental health, acute care and third sector providers into teams "built around general practices in local neighbourhoods"
- a new "OneCall" service: a 24/7 single point of coordination, provided by South Central Ambulance Service, which GPs or local clinicians can contact to arrange for urgent care for people most at risk of admission
- a 24/7 urgent care, community based rapid response service, called the joint emergency team, provided by Cambridgeshire and Peterborough NHS Foundation Trust.

The contract provides seven domains against which its outcomes will be judged: patient experience; safe care; quality care; prevention; urgent care; long term care; and end of life care. Within these there are 62 indicators. Eventually 15% of the contract value will depend on performance against these indicators.

== Contract termination ==
On 3 December 2015 UnitingCare Partnership and Cambridgeshire and Peterborough Clinical Commissioning Group released a joint statement explaining that the contract was being terminated because they agreed it was no longer financially sustainable. The statement suggested that the service delivery model will continue for the time being. The National Audit Office undertook an investigation into the collapse of the contract, which was published in July 2016. Their verdict was that the contract "failed for financial reasons which could, and should, have been foreseen".
