= East of England Community Health and Care NHS Trust =

- Type: NHS trust
- Established: 1 April 2026
- Headquarters: St Ives, Cambridgeshire, England
- Region served: Bedfordshire; Cambridgeshire; Norfolk; Suffolk
- Website: www.eastofenglandcommunityhealthandcare.nhs.uk

East of England Community Health and Care NHS Trust is an NHS trust which provides community health services in Bedfordshire, Cambridgeshire, Norfolk and Suffolk.

== Services ==
It runs:

- Bedfordshire, Cambridgeshire, Milton Keynes, Norfolk and Peterborough integrated contraception and sexual health services (iCaSH)
- Luton community adult and children's health
- Cambridgeshire and Peterborough musculo-skeletal services
- Cambridgeshire, Peterborough, Norfolk and Suffolk dental health services
- Bedfordshire community health and neuro-therapy services
- Other services previously under the control of the Norfolk Community Health and Care NHS Trust

== History ==
The trust was formed on 1 April 2026 following the merger of the Cambridgeshire Community Services NHS Trust and Norfolk Community Health and Care NHS Trust.

=== Cambridgeshire Community Services NHS Trust ===
Cambridgeshire Community Services Trust was an NHS trust that was established as part of the programme called Transforming Community Services under which a number of community health NHS trusts were established when these services were separated from primary care trusts.

The trust became a community NHS Trust on 1 April 2010.

It was part of two consortium bids for an £800m older people's service contract for Cambridgeshire and Peterborough Clinical Commissioning Group, first as part of a consortium with Capita and private health firm Circle, and then with Optum, formerly UnitedHealth UK, when Capita opted to withdraw from the process.

In April 2015 following the failure of these bids the trust transferred 1,360 staff to Cambridgeshire and Peterborough NHS Foundation Trust and 115 to various other providers. It had, however, "won three multimillion pound contracts during 2014-15 to provide sexual health services in Norfolk and Suffolk, as well as the School Immunisation Programme across Cambridgeshire, Peterborough, Norfolk and Suffolk". Subsequently, the contract collapsed, after just eight months.

It was named by the Health Service Journal as the best community trust to work for in 2015. At that time it had 2864 full-time equivalent staff and a sickness absence rate of 4.89%. 83% of staff recommend it as a place for treatment and 73% recommended it as a place to work.

In 2019 the Care Quality Commission rated the trust outstanding and said it provided "excellent care and treatment, particularly in its community sexual health services".

In 2023/24 it had 2,360 employees.

In 2022 it won a £8.4 million contract to provide mental health support to 7,000 children in Norfolk and Waveney schools for three years, taking over from Ormiston Families. They also provide health visitors, school nurses and speech and language therapists in the area, and in Peterborough and Cambridge.

=== Norfolk Community Health and Care NHS Trust ===
Norfolk Community Health and Care NHS Trust was a provider of community services to a population of about 882,000 in Norfolk. It was established under the Transforming Community Services initiative, with a headquarters on Bowthorpe Road, Norwich, NR2 3TU. It comprises the community services previously run by Norfolk Primary Care Trust.

It employed 2,250 full-time equivalent members of staff. Roisin Fallon-Williams was appointed chief executive in March 2015, in succession to Michael Scott. Lisa Christensen, former head of Norfolk County Council's children's services department resigned after two weeks as a non-executive member of the board in November 2014.

It was part of a joint venture with West Suffolk NHS Foundation Trust and Ipswich Hospital NHS Trust which took over the provision of community care in Suffolk from Serco in October 2015.

The trust was rated outstanding by the Care Quality Commission in 2018. "There were many notable examples of outstanding practice… We saw examples where patients had become members of steering groups and attended staff mandatory training days to provide patient perspectives to staff."

In 2022 it set up a remote monitoring service using Inhealthcare software to help increase life expectancy and quality of life for patients diagnosed with heart failure. Patients will monitor their own vital signs at home and relay the readings to clinicians, who will intervene if they provide any cause for concern. This should produce significant reductions in hospital bed days, A&E attendances, GP visits, travel to hospitals and out-of-hours appointments.
