= CareRooms =

British healthcare company

- Trade name: CareRooms
- Company type: Private
- Industry: Healthcare
- Founder: Paul Gaudin
- Headquarters: Cambridge, United Kingdom
- Number of employees: <5

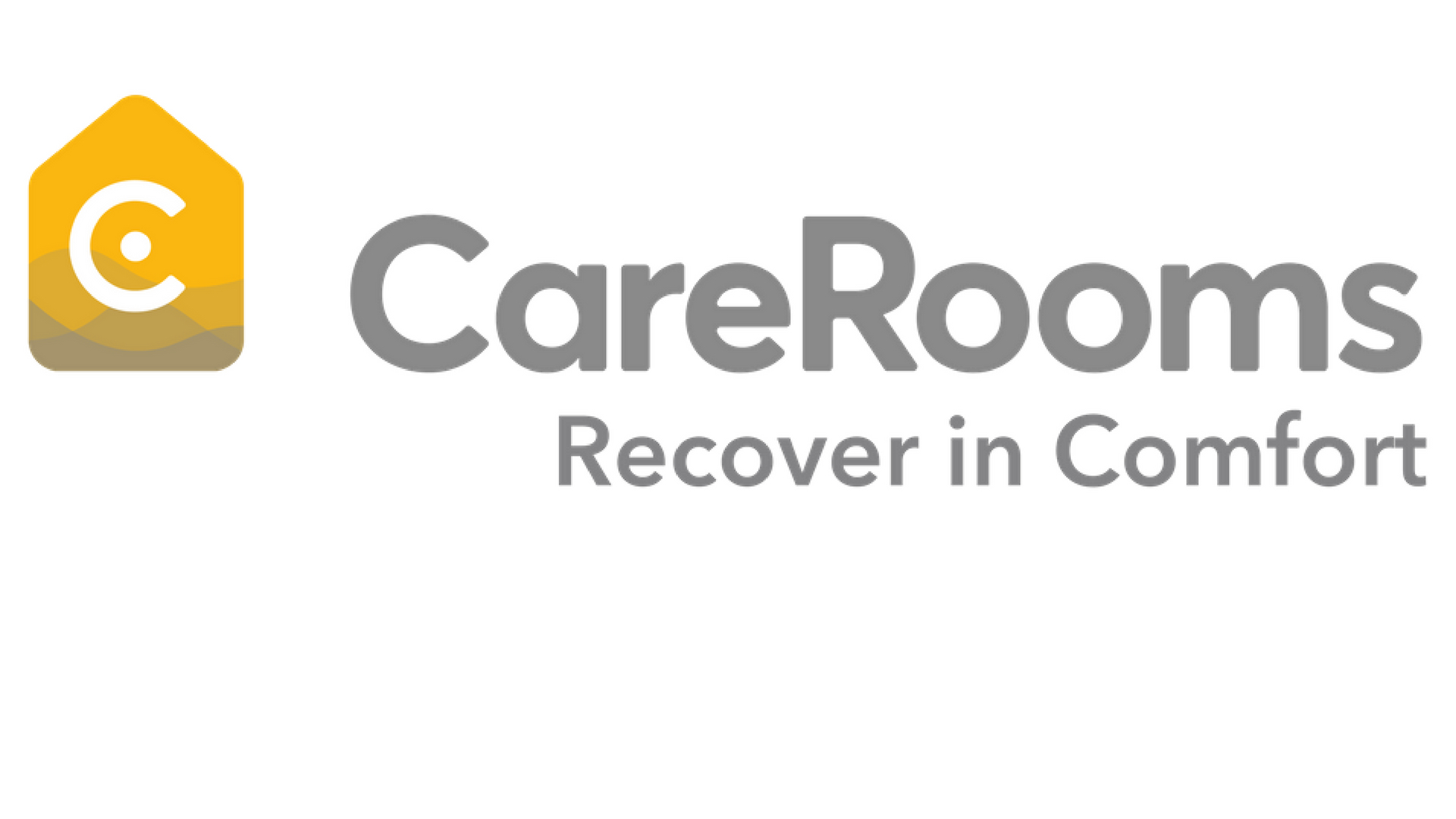
CareRooms logo and strapline

CareRooms was a British company based in Cambridge, which operated in Cambridgeshire, Surrey and Yorkshire. CareRooms were attempting to deliver an alternative to extended stays in hospital and residential homes for elderly people. It has been said they were attempting to transfer the concept of Airbnb into the health and social care sector, however there were noticeable differences between this scheme and Airbnb. Their plan was to arrange rooms in private homes for patients who do not need to be in hospital but are not able to return to their own homes. It has been characterised as "CareBnB".

CareRooms paid "Hosts" a minimum of £50 per night. The "Host" received no care training, with this instead being provided by regulatory domiciliary care agencies. "Hosts" only provided the room and cooked pre-prepared meals as well as offering conversation and companionship to the "Guest" staying with them.

Safeguarding concerns came to light in October 2018 and CareRooms responded by saying that all Hosts complete training on 'Adult Safeguarding, Food Safety, Cleaning for Infection Control, and the Mental Health Capacity Act, as well as having to be DBS checked'.

A similar but unrelated scheme is being proposed in Utrecht, Netherlands.

In March 2018 Cambridgeshire County Council announced an exploratory deal which only involved low acuity self funding patients. There would not be any contractual arrangement with the council. Homeowners would have been paid £50 a night and the company would provide any necessary equipment. Each placement would have had biometric monitoring and instant access to a video GP service. The hosts went through a careful vetting with DBS checks and personal interviews and then a detailed training process. If care - above a room and meals - is required it will be provided by a regulated care provider. Chief Executive Paul Gaudin claims the environment would be much safer than the current facilities that patients are often discharged into. Chairwoman of the council committee Anna Bailey stated they 'have not committed to piloting CareRooms, but we think the innovative concept is interesting and worth exploring...We would like to give CareRooms the space to explore its concept.

Councillor Sandra Crawford from Cambridge County Council said a discussion for CareRooms needed to be 'scrutinised' by all (councillors, NHS Trusts, social care providers etc). Mr Gaudin said he welcomed a discussion saying it was not about 'playing politics' but instead getting 'communities to support each other as much as possible'.

North Yorkshire County Council and City of York Council sponsored an expansion of the scheme in Selby and York in 2021 to help people recover after being discharged from hospital. Tele-care and monitoring equipment is fitted in the rooms to ensure guests vital signs are checked and there was 24-hour video access to a GP service. It was said to make use of the "resources that exist within local communities" in a report proposing further expansion to Richmond, Scarborough and Whitby.

As of January 2025 the website carerooms.com is no longer active and key personnel have left the organisation.

== See also ==
- Private healthcare in the United Kingdom
