= North West Anglia NHS Foundation Trust =

English Healthcare trust

- Type: NHS foundation trust
- Established: 1 April 2017
- Headquarters: Bretton Gate; Bretton; Peterborough; PE3 9GZ
- Hospitals: Hinchingbrooke Hospital; Peterborough City Hospital; Stamford and Rutland Hospital
- Staff: 6,789 (2020)
- Website: www.nwangliaft.nhs.uk

North West Anglia NHS Foundation Trust was formed on 1 April 2017 from the acquisition of Hinchingbrooke Health Care NHS Trust by Peterborough and Stamford Hospitals NHS Foundation Trust. It runs Peterborough City Hospital, Stamford and Rutland Hospital and Hinchingbrooke Hospital.

== History ==
Established in 1993, Peterborough Hospitals NHS Trust originally comprised two hospitals, Peterborough District Hospital and Edith Cavell Hospital. In 2002 Stamford and Rutland Hospital in Lincolnshire joined the trust. In 2006 Peterborough and Stamford Hospitals NHS Foundation Trust was rated one of the country's top performing NHS acute trusts and, in 2004, it became one of the first ten NHS foundation trusts in England. Peterborough City Hospital was financed through the Private Finance Initiative and led the Trust into acute financial difficulties. It had built up an underlying deficit of £37 million a year on a turnover of £222 million by the end of 2012/13.

A redevelopment programme for Stamford and Rutland Hospital was approved in October 2013.

In January 2014 it was reported that Circle Health could table a rescue bid for the Trust involving partnering it with nearby Hinchingbrooke Hospital. The bid never materialised, but in July 2016 it was announced that the two trusts were planning to merge in 2017.

The "North West Anglia" name had previously been used for the merger of Peterborough Health Authority and West Norfolk and Wisbech Health Authority in 1992, until the formation of Cambridgeshire Health Authority and Norfolk Health Authority in 1999.

== Performance ==
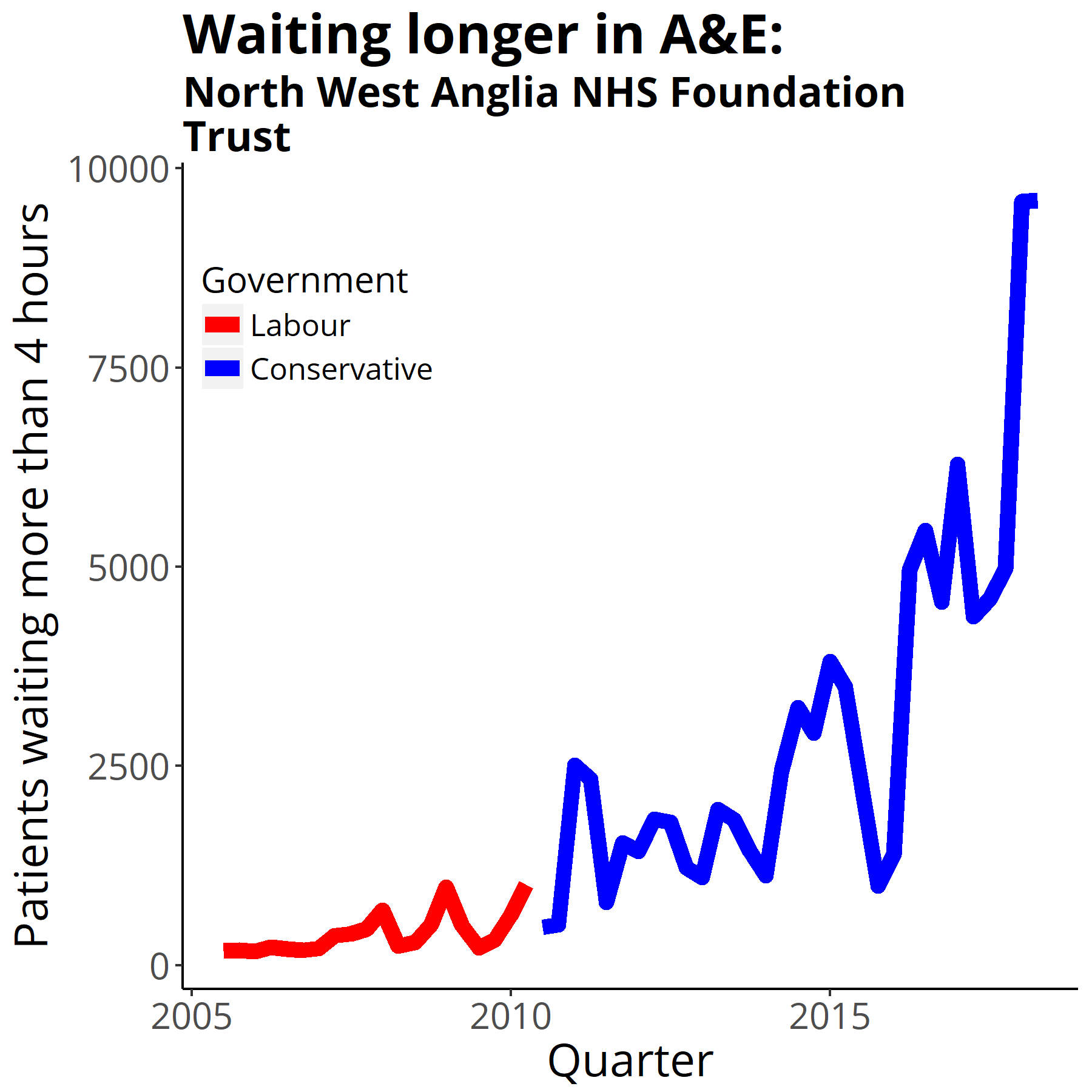
Four-hour target in the emergency department quarterly figures from NHS England Data from https://www.england.nhs.uk/statistics/statistical-work-areas/ae-waiting-times-and-activity/

The trust was one of 26 responsible for half of the national growth in patients waiting more than four hours in accident and emergency over the 2014/5 winter.

It spent £18.7 million, 7.5% of its total turnover, on agency staff in 2014/5.

== See also ==
- Healthcare in Cambridgeshire
- List of NHS trusts
