= East Suffolk and North Essex NHS Foundation Trust =

NHS foundation trust in the East of England

- Type: NHS foundation trust
- Established: 1 July 2018
- Headquarters: Colchester, Essex, England
- Hospitals: Colchester Hospital; Ipswich Hospital
- Chair: Mark Millar (interim)
- Chief executive: Nick Hulme
- Staff: 12,379 (2023/24)
- Website: www.esneft.nhs.uk

East Suffolk and North Essex NHS Foundation Trust is an NHS foundation trust in the East of England. It runs Colchester Hospital in Colchester, Essex and Ipswich Hospital in Ipswich, Suffolk, as well as several smaller community hospitals in the surrounding area.

== History ==
The trust was formed on 1 July 2018 by the merger of Colchester Hospital University NHS Foundation Trust and The Ipswich Hospital NHS Trust.

The trust used Datix in 2022 to report inappropriate attendances at A&E to GP practices. These reports were said to increase stress on GPs and to be 'a major source of strife locally which the Local Medical Committee has repeatedly sought to defuse'.

== Development ==
In 2019 the trust announced plans to end open access to the Accident and Emergency department. The plan is that patients will arrive at a newly built urgent treatment centre at Colchester hospital run by the trust and the local GP confederation which will deal with minor injuries and illnesses. From there the trust expects less than half of the present numbers will need the A&E department.

It launched an automated e-referrals process in 2019 which it said saved 27,000 hours of staff time in the first sixteen months of operation. It hopes to prevent 13,000 missed outpatient appointments.

== Hospitals ==
The main hospitals are:

- Colchester Hospital
- Ipswich Hospital

Community hospitals and other services include:

- Aldeburgh Cottage Hospital
- Bluebird Lodge in Ravenswood
- Fryatt Memorial Hospital
- Halstead Hospital

=== Halstead Hospital ===
Halstead Hospital is an NHS hospital in Halstead, Essex (51.9483°N 0.6381°E) and is part of the trust. The hospital was a gift from George Courtauld in 1884. Its facilities were closed during the COVID pandemic, but reopened in 2022.

== See also ==
- List of NHS trusts
- List of hospitals in England
