= Ipswich Hospital =

Hospital in Ipswich, Suffolk, England

- East Suffolk and North Essex NHS Foundation Trust
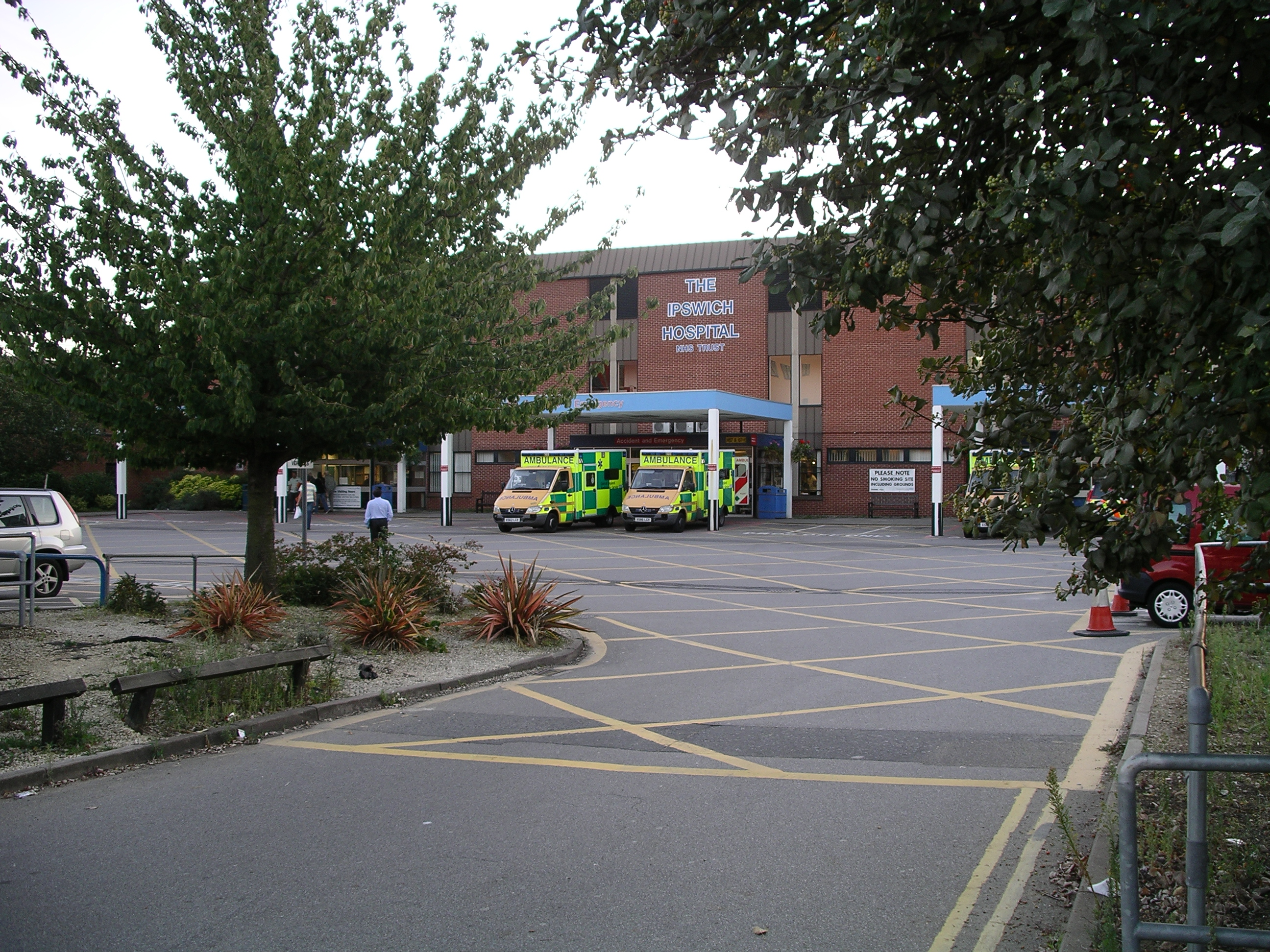
- Ipswich Hospital South Entrance

- Shown in Suffolk

Geography
- Location: Heath Road, Ipswich, Suffolk, England
- Coordinates: 52.0570°N 1.1979°E

Organisation
- Care system: NHS England
- Type: District General
- Affiliated university: University of Cambridge; University of East Anglia; University of Essex; University of Suffolk

Services
- Emergency department: Yes
- Beds: 552 (approx)

History
- Founded: 1889

Links
- Website: www.esneft.nhs.uk/your-visit/getting-here/ipswich-hospital/

Ipswich Hospital is a large district general hospital in Heath Road, Ipswich, Suffolk, England. It is now managed by East Suffolk and North Essex NHS Foundation Trust which was formed on 1 July 2018 by the merging of Ipswich Hospital NHS Trust with Colchester Hospital University NHS Foundation Trust.

== History ==
The hospital had its origins in the Ipswich Workhouse Infirmary, which was designed by Henry Percy Adams and built by George Grimwood & Son, and which opened in 1889. It became the Ipswich Borough General Hospital in 1939 and, after it had joined the National Health Service in 1948, it became the Ipswich Hospital, Heath Road Wing in 1955. After services transferred from the old Anglesea Road site in 1985, the hospital simply became known as Ipswich Hospital.

The hospital started implementing the Lorenzo patient record systems in December 2013. It became one of the partners in the Pathology Partnership established in March 2014 and started acting as one of two hubs for pathology in the region.

The Garrett Anderson Centre, named after the UK's first female doctor, Elizabeth Garrett Anderson, opened in June 2008. Located at the South-East corner of the hospital land, the building includes an Emergency Department.

In 2022 the first part of its new children's department opened. The project should be completed by summer 2024.

== Performance ==
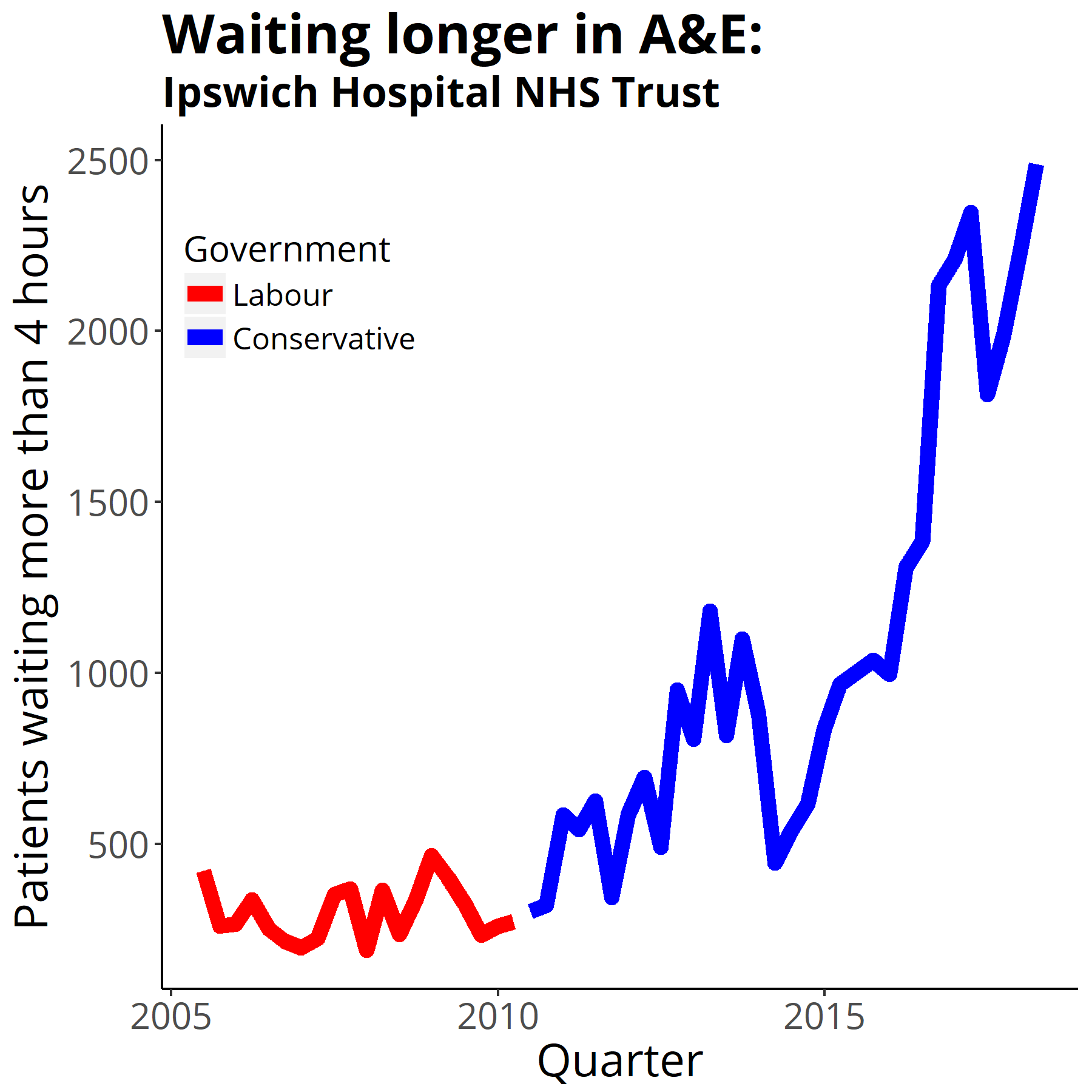
Four-hour target in the emergency department quarterly figures from NHS England Data from https://www.england.nhs.uk/statistics/statistical-work-areas/ae-waiting-times-and-activity/

In November 2013 it was reported that the Ipswich Hospital NHS Trust had failed to meet a number of targets set by the Ipswich and East Suffolk Clinical Commissioning Group and faced financial penalties at a time when it already faced a deficit of £5.5 million.

In 2014 the trust was the fifth best in England on the target of seeing 95 per cent of people who attend accident and emergency departments within four hours; it achieved 96.6 percent, despite an 11 per cent increase in non-elective admissions. The trust has developed a tool that gives three hours' warning when the target is likely to be missed, based on factors such as acuity and intensive therapy unit bed numbers.

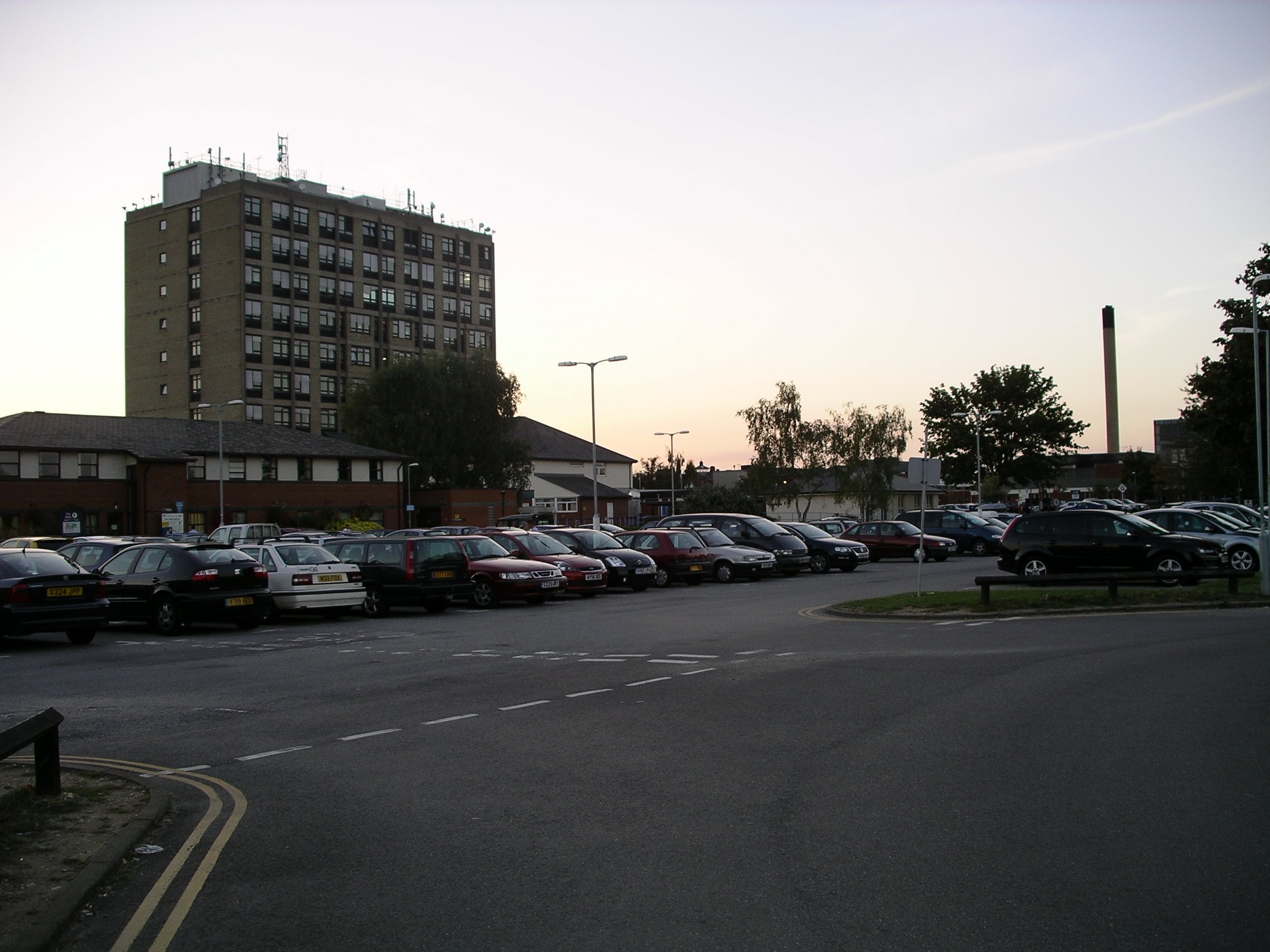
The tower block at Ipswich Hospital

== See also ==
- List of hospitals in England
- List of NHS trusts
- Healthcare in Suffolk
- List of tallest buildings and structures in Ipswich
