= Westwood, Peterborough =

Residential area of Peterborough, England

Coordinates: 52°35′07″N 0°16′12″W

Westwood is a residential area of the city of Peterborough, in the ceremonial county of Cambridgeshire, England. For electoral purposes it forms part of Ravensthorpe ward. Manufacturers of industrial machinery, Baker Perkins, relocated here from London in 1903. HMP Peterborough, the first purpose-built prison to house both men and women, opened on the site of the former engineering works in 2005.

The construction of the estate began in the mid-1960s on land formerly in use as RAF Peterborough, a Second World War training base for allied and Commonwealth pilots. The adjacent Westwood Farm, formerly Horrells Dairies, is now home to the New Covent Garden Soup Company.

Highlees County Primary School is located in the area; secondary pupils attend nearby Jack Hunt School in Netherton. The Anglican parish church is dedicated to St Jude.

== See also ==
- Edith Cavell Hospital (1998–2010)
- Peterborough City Hospital
