= Edith Cavell Healthcare Campus =

Coordinates: 52.5846°N 0.2784°W

The Edith Cavell Campus is a National Health Service healthcare campus in the city of Peterborough in the United Kingdom.

The campus, situated on the site of the former Edith Cavell Hospital, was opened in 2010 and comprises the following healthcare facilities:

- Peterborough City Hospital: This is a 623-bed acute general district hospital, managed by North West Anglia NHS Foundation Trust.
- The Cavell Centre: this is a purpose-built unit, which provides secure in-patient and day services for adults with mental health problems and people with learning disabilities. It is managed by Cambridgeshire and Peterborough NHS Foundation Trust, a member of Cambridge University Health Partners.

== See also ==
- Peterborough District Hospital (1928–2010)
