= Shelf (organization) =

UK voluntary organization

- Formation: 2007
- Type: Voluntary association
- Purpose: Sexual health education
- Location: Peterborough, UK
- Region served: United Kingdom
- Founders: Andrew Aistrup, Charley Genever, Ciara McElderry, Abigail Sykes
- Website: www.shelf.org.uk

Shelf is a voluntary organisation created with the aim of bringing new levels of sexual health awareness to young people of the United Kingdom. It is unique in that it was founded by four Year 10 students of Peterborough in April 2007 and is still currently owned and operated by them. It was founded with support from members of Peterborough City Council and the Peterborough NHS Primary Care Trust. Shelf runs via a website and distributed brochures containing information on sexual health and links to local support organisations.

== History ==
Shelf was originally created as a business idea to be entered into "The Big Deal", a national business and enterprise challenge run by the National Academy for Gifted and Talented Youth (NAGTY). The competition ran over 10 weeks, and required groups of students (aided by a mentor) to produce a business idea by completing weekly tasks. Over 30 groups entered the competition and then presented their ideas to a panel of judges, in the style of the BBC's Dragons' Den, at an event held at Aston Business School in July 2007. The four best groups then presented their ideas again to all competitors and judges. "Team Joey"–named after the character in the US TV sitcom Friends–presented Shelf and won the competition.

The prize was a fully funded five-star trip to New York City which took place in October 2007. As well as sightseeing, the students (accompanied by two teachers and a member of staff from the University of Warwick, England) visited the Goldman Sachs offices, where they presented their ideas once more. Staff were "said to have been extremely impressed".

An additional prize of the funding necessary to start up the enterprise was personally offered by Glenn Earle (chief managing director of Goldman Sachs Investment Bank Europe).

== Service launch ==
Shelf website

In December 2008, Shelf established links with members of the Peterborough NHS Primary Care Trust (CaSH), Peterborough City Council and DrinkSense to discuss how best the services could be implemented and run alongside what was already in place in Peterborough.

In January 2008, a full trial of the website was run for Year 11 students (aged 15–16) in Jack Hunt School, from which feedback was ascertained, aiding the development of the website.

Following further funding from The Youth Bank of Peterborough City Council, the website was officially launched on 19 March 2008. A publicised media event was held inviting representatives from across the UK. Local BBC News and magazine coverage later followed.

== Redesign ==
An updated, newly designed multi-platform version of Shelf (2.0) went live on 18 July 2009 after three months of development and contribution by and from students.

Search facilities, local service links and embedded content were added to leave room for future development and expansion.
