= West Suffolk NHS Foundation Trust =

NHS hospital trust

- Type: NHS foundation trust
- Hospitals: West Suffolk Hospital
- Website: www.wsh.nhs.uk

West Suffolk NHS Foundation Trust is an NHS foundation trust which runs West Suffolk Hospital, a large district general hospital in Bury St Edmunds, Suffolk, England. The Trust provides a wide range of services to the population of west Suffolk and serves a catchment area of approximately 600 square miles with a population of around 280,000 people.

It was named by the Health Service Journal as one of the top hundred NHS trusts to work for in 2015. At that time it had 2604 full-time equivalent staff and a sickness absence rate of 3.86%. 78% of staff recommend it as a place for treatment and 76% recommended it as a place to work.

The trust went live with the Cerner Millennium electronic patient record system in May 2016. In September 2016, the trust was selected by NHS England as one of twelve Global Digital Exemplars.

== See also ==
- List of NHS trusts
- Healthcare in Suffolk
