= Peterborough City Hospital =

Coordinates: 52.5846°N 0.2784°W

- North West Anglia NHS Foundation Trust
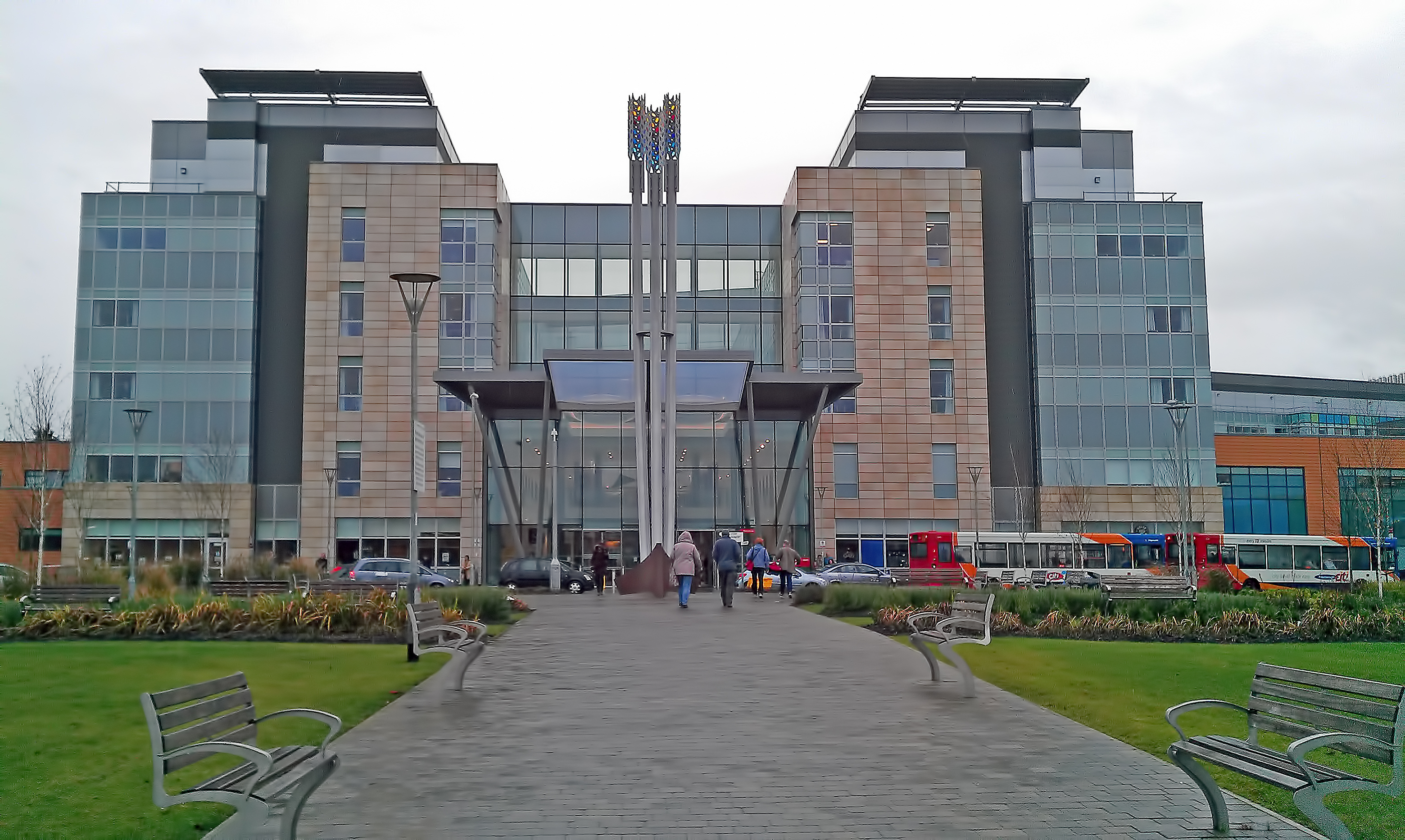
- Peterborough City Hospital

Geography
- Location: Bretton Gate, Peterborough, England, United Kingdom

Organisation
- Care system: National Health Service
- Type: District general

Services
- Emergency department: Yes Accident & Emergency

Links
- Website: www.nwangliaft.nhs.uk/our-hospitals/peterborough-city-hospital/
- Lists: Hospitals in England

Peterborough City Hospital is a modern, purpose-built hospital on the Edith Cavell Healthcare Campus serving the city of Peterborough, north Cambridgeshire, areas of east Northamptonshire, areas of south Lincolnshire and Rutland. It is managed by North West Anglia NHS Foundation Trust.

== History ==
The hospital was procured under a Private Finance Initiative contract in 2007 to replace Peterborough District Hospital and the Edith Cavell Hospital. It was designed by Nightingale Associates and built on the site of the Edith Cavell Hospital by Multiplex at a cost of £340 million and opened to patients in November 2010. The official opening was carried out by the Duke and Duchess of Cambridge in November 2012. In same month, the National Audit Office reported that the Trust board's poor financial management and procurement of the scheme, which had been unaffordable, had left the Trust in a critical financial position.

== Facilities ==
The bed hospital has a Cancer Centre, Cardiology Centre, a Women's and Children's Unit and Adult and Paediatric Emergency Centres. It features 4-bedded 'cruciform wards’ which creates a large personal space around each bed and maximises the availability of daylight. It opened with 611 beds. The British Red Cross provides support services to help avoid admissions or speed up discharge from the hospital.

== See also ==
- Healthcare in Cambridgeshire
- List of hospitals in England
- Shelf (sexual health service), Peterborough
