= Colchester Hospital University NHS Foundation Trust =

NHS Foundation Trust in England

Colchester Hospital University NHS Foundation Trust (CHUFT) was an NHS Foundation Trust which ran Colchester Hospital in Colchester, Essex.

In 2018, the trust merged with The Ipswich Hospital NHS Trust to form East Suffolk and North Essex NHS Foundation Trust.

== Staff ==
In 2007/08 the Trust employed 3,383 people, 86% of them directly involved in patient care.

== Hospital sites ==
The Trust's main acute hospital site, which was opened in 1985, is Colchester Hospital. The Trust also owns Essex County Hospital in Colchester, which was opened in 1820. At Harwich and Clacton community hospitals, both managed by NHS North East Essex (the PCT), the Trust provides minor injury and outpatient services.

== Performance ==
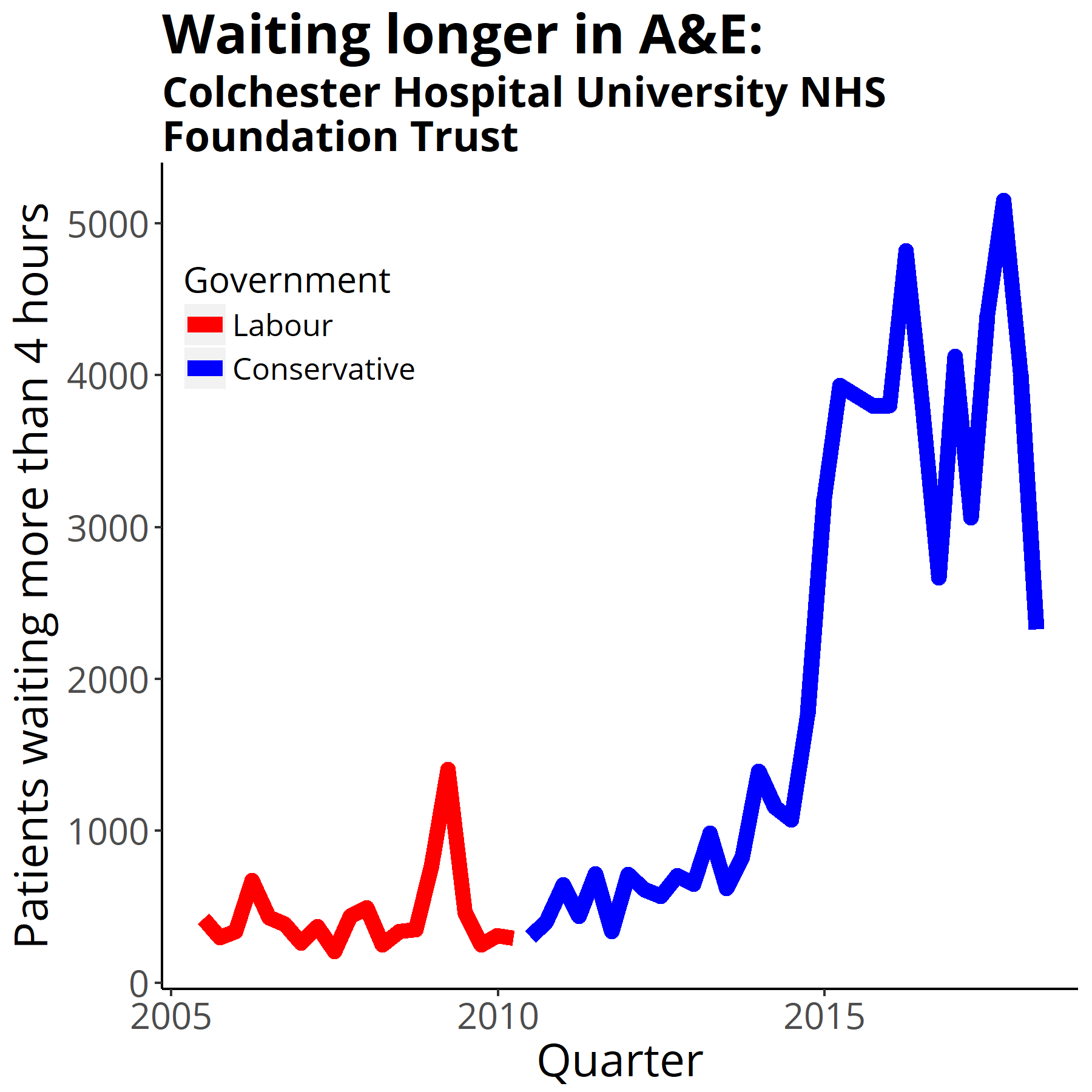
Four-hour target in the emergency department quarterly figures from NHS England Data from https://www.england.nhs.uk/statistics/statistical-work-areas/ae-waiting-times-and-activity/

In 2009 the Chair of the Trust, Richard W. Bourne, was removed by Monitor because it was failing to meet clinical targets.

In November 2013 the Care Quality Commission reported that it had found discrepancies between the hospital's cancer waiting time records and the information contained in patients' individual medical records. 22 out of 61 records showed people had been put "at risk of receiving care that was unsafe or not effective, due to delays in receiving appointments or treatment". In November 2013 the Trust was placed in special measures by Monitor. Gordon Coutts, the chief executive, who had been on sick leave announced on 18 December 2013 that he would not be returning to the post. After an investigation it was concluded that the inaccuracies the hospital's cancer waiting times figures were caused by managerial incompetence rather than bullying of staff. In November 2017 it was taken out of special measures after it was rated good for whether services were effective, caring and well led. The children's transition team and neonatal unit were found to be outstanding.

In November 2014 the Trust declared a "major incident" following an inspection by the Care Quality Commission in which "safeguarding concerns" were raised. Interim chief executive Dr Lucy Moore said the focus was on "discharging patients."

The trust was one of 26 responsible for half of the national growth in patients waiting more than four hours in accident and emergency over the 2014/5 winter.

It spent 10.3% of its total turnover on agency staff in 2014/5.

It expects a deficit of £30 million for 2015/6. In the last quarter of 2015 it had one of the worst performances of any hospital in England against the four hour waiting target.

== See also ==
- Healthcare in Essex
- List of NHS trusts
