= Healthcare in Cambridgeshire =

Healthcare in Cambridgeshire was the responsibility of NHS Cambridgeshire and Peterborough Clinical Commissioning Group until July 2022. This was one of the largest in the United Kingdom.

== History ==
From 1947 to 1965, NHS services in Cambridgeshire were managed by the East Anglian Regional Hospital Board. In 1974, the boards were abolished and replaced by regional health authorities. Cambridgeshire came under the East Anglian RHA. Regions were reorganised in 1996 and Cambridgeshire came under the Anglia and Oxford Regional Health Authority. Cambridgeshire had an area health authority from 1974 until 1982 when it was divided into three district health authorities: Cambridge, Huntingdon and Peterborough. In 1993 these were reunited. Regional health authorities were reorganised and renamed strategic health authorities in 2002. Cambridgeshire was under the Norfolk, Suffolk and Cambridgeshire SHA. In 2006 regions were again reorganised and Cambridgeshire came under NHS East of England until that was abolished in 2013. There were two primary care trusts for the area: Cambridgeshire and Peterborough.

=== UnitingCare Partnership ===
UnitingCare Partnership was a partnership established by Cambridgeshire and Peterborough NHS Foundation Trust and Cambridge University Hospitals NHS Foundation Trust as a limited liability partnership to manage an £800m integrated older people's services contract in Cambridgeshire and Peterborough. In December 2015 the contract was terminated, as it was agreed by both parties that it was not financially viable. However it appeared that the new model of care would continue without the financial incentives built into the contract. The National Audit Office undertook an investigation into the collapse of the contract, which was published in July 2016. Their verdict was that the contract "failed for financial reasons which could, and should, have been foreseen".

== Integrated care system ==
Cambridgeshire and Peterborough health and social care commissioners and providers developed a sustainability and transformation plan in March 2016 with Dr Neil Modha, the Chief Clinical Officer of Cambridgeshire and Peterborough Clinical Commissioning Group as its leader

Cambridgeshire and Peterborough Clinical Commissioning Group's problems were said by PricewaterhouseCoopers to be "among the broadest and deepest set of issues facing any CCG we have worked with" in June 2018 after it finished 2017–18 with a £42 million deficit.

The Cambridgeshire and Peterborough Integrated Care System signed an eight-year contract with Orion Health in 2021 to develop a shared care record that will be used by eight health and care organisations and all the GP practices in its area.

== Commissioning ==
Until 2022, NHS services in the area were commissioned by NHS Cambridgeshire and Peterborough CCG.

=== In vitro fertilisation ===
In 2017 the CCG decided to suspend NHS-funded in vitro fertilisation (IVF) fertility services indefinitely. Suspending the service saved the CCG £598,000 in 2018/19. The Department of Health and Social Care said the decision not to fund IVF was "not acceptable". The CCG was facing a deficit of £192 million and was expected to make savings of £33 million in 2019/20. In July 2021, the CCG decided to reinstate the service, providing one cycle of IVF to women under the age of 40.

== Services ==
=== Primary care ===
As of July 2021, there are 85 GP practices in the area.

=== Community services ===
Cambridgeshire and Peterborough NHS Foundation Trust and Cambridgeshire Community Services NHS Trust provide community care services in the county.

There are three hospices in Cambridgeshire:

- Arthur Rank Hospice, Cambridge, run by Arthur Rank Hospice Charity
- Thorpe Hall Hospice, Peterborough, run by Sue Ryder
- Milton Children's Hospice, Milton, run by East Anglia's Children's Hospices

=== Acute care ===
Cambridge University Hospitals NHS Foundation Trust, North West Anglia NHS Foundation Trust and Royal Papworth Hospital NHS Foundation Trust are the NHS hospital trusts in the area. Plans are approved for the development of Cambridge Children's Hospital, which is a collaboration between Cambridge University Hospitals, the University of Cambridge and the Cambridgeshire and Peterborough NHS Foundation Trust. Building work is due to start in 2023 and the hospital is earmarked for completion in 2025.

In March 2018 Cambridgeshire County Council announced an exploratory deal with CareRooms which would involve low acuity self funding patients. Homeowners would be paid £50 a night to accommodate patients leaving hospital and the company would provide any necessary equipment. Each placement would have biometric monitoring and instant access to a video GP service. The hosts would have to go through a vetting and training process. If care - above a room and meals - is required it would be provided by a regulated care provider. Chief executive Paul Gaudin claimed the environment would be much safer than the current facilities that patients are often discharged into. Chairwoman of the council committee Anna Bailey states they 'have not committed to piloting CareRooms, but we think the innovative concept is interesting and worth exploring...We would like to give CareRooms the space to explore its concept.

=== Ambulance services ===
Ambulance services are provided by the East of England Ambulance Service.

=== Mental health ===
Cambridgeshire and Peterborough NHS Foundation Trust is the main NHS provider.

== Healthwatch ==
Healthwatch is an organisation set up under the Health and Social Care Act 2012 to act as a voice for patients.

== See also ==
- Category:Health in Cambridgeshire
- Healthcare in the United Kingdom
