= Mary Archer =

British chemist (born 1944)

The Right Honourable The Lady Archer of Weston-super-Mare DBE
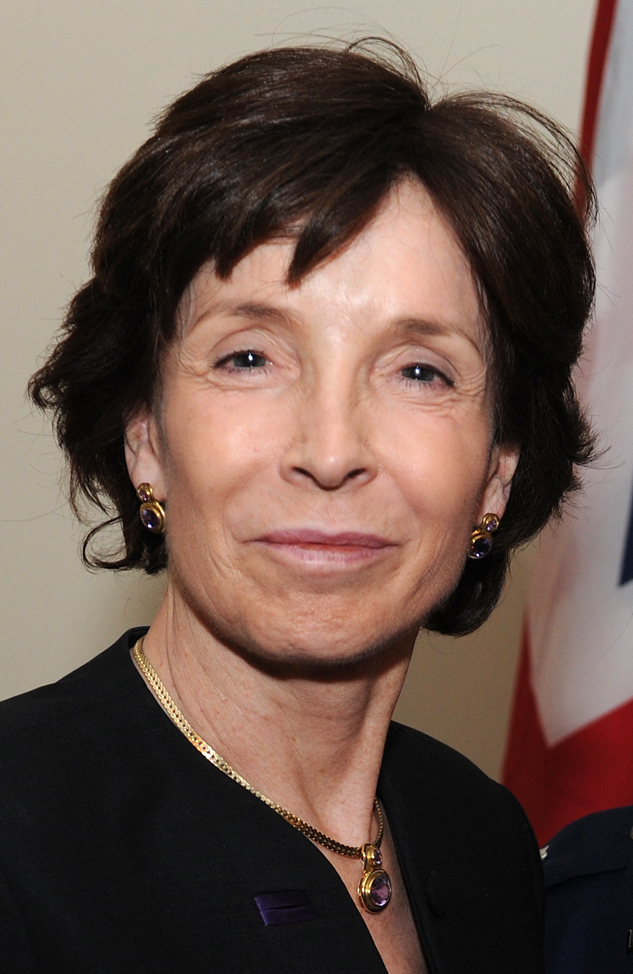
- Archer in 2011
- Born: Mary Doreen Weeden; 22 December 1944 (age 81); Epsom, Surrey, England
- Education: Cheltenham Ladies' College; University of Oxford (MA); Imperial College London (PhD)
- Spouse: Jeffrey Archer (m. 1966; died 2026)
- Children: 2
- Scientific career
- Fields: Solar energy conversion
- Workplaces: Somerville College, Oxford; St Hilda's College, Oxford; Royal Institution; Newnham College, Cambridge; Trinity College, Cambridge; National Energy Foundation
- Doctoral students: Joanna Bauldreay

Mary Doreen Archer, Baroness Archer of Weston-super-Mare (née Weeden; born 22 December 1944), commonly known as Dame Mary Archer, is a British scientist specialising in solar energy conversion.

She was married to novelist Jeffrey Archer until his death in 2026. Appointed DBE in 2012, she currently serves as chancellor of the University of Buckingham.

== Early life and education ==
Born in 1944 at Epsom, Surrey, the younger daughter of Harold Norman Weeden and Doreen née Cox, Mary Weeden attended Cheltenham Ladies' College before reading chemistry at St Anne's College, Oxford.

She pursued further studies in physical chemistry at Imperial College London, taking a PhD (Londin): her thesis was titled "Heterogeneous catalysis of inorganic substitution reactions" and was submitted in 1968.

== Career ==
Archer was elected a junior research fellow at St Hilda's College, Oxford, from 1968 to 1971. She was then a temporary lecturer in chemistry at Somerville College, Oxford, for the 1971/72 academic year. After Oxford, she worked as a scientific researcher under Sir George Porter (who later became Baron Porter of Luddenham) at the Royal Institution in London. It was during this period that she became interested in photoelectrochemistry and has since written and lectured extensively on the subject.

Appointed to the board of directors of the International Solar Energy Society, Archer was elected a fellow of Newnham College becoming a lecturer in chemistry at Trinity College in the University of Cambridge from 1976 to 1986. From 1984 to 1991, she was a director of the Fitzwilliam Museum Trust and a non-executive director of Mid Anglia Radio plc between 1988 and 1995.

Archer joined the Council of Lloyd's in 1988, becoming Chairman of Lloyd's Hardship Committee the following year, having been a Lloyd's 'Name' since 1977.

From 1988 to 2000, Archer chaired the National Energy Foundation which promotes improving the use of energy in buildings, becoming its president then patron. President of the UK Solar Energy Society (UK-ISES), she is a companion of the Energy Institute and was awarded its Melchett Medal in 2002.

Archer has written and contributed to various volumes of work concerning solar energy, including Photochemical & Photoelectrochemical Approaches to Solar Energy Conversion, which took 15 years to write. She co-edited Clean Electricity from Photovoltaics (2001); Molecular to Global Photosynthesis (2004); The 1702 Chair of Chemistry at Cambridge: Transformation and Change (2005) and Nanostructured and Photoelectrochemical Systems for Solar Photon Conversion (2008).

In 1994, she was a non-executive director of Anglia Television at a time when it was the target of a takeover bid. Following reports from the London Stock Exchange, the Department of Trade and Industry appointed inspectors on 8 February 1994 to investigate possible insider trading contraventions by certain individuals, including her husband. No charges were brought. Between 1991 and 1999 she sat on the Council of the Cheltenham Ladies' College.

Archer chaired Cambridge University Hospitals NHS Foundation Trust (incorporating Addenbrooke's and the Rosie Hospital) for 10 years until 2012, having previously been a non-executive director (1993–99), and vice-chair (1999–2002) of Addenbrooke's Hospital NHS Trust. Between 2005 and 2008, she led a pioneer NHS-funded initiative to create patient decision aids for patients with localised prostate cancer (or BPH). In 2007 she was awarded the Eva Philbin Award of the Institute of Chemistry of Ireland. She was founder director of Cambridge University Health Partners 2009–12, and was deputy chair of ACT (Addenbrooke's Charitable Trust) from 1997 to 2015. In 2015, she led a group to create an online PDA and information/advice for bladder cancer patients in Addenbrooke's Hospital, and across the Anglia Cancer Network.

A trustee of the Science Museum Group from 1990 to 2000, then chairman from 2015, on 24 February 2020, Archer was installed as chancellor of the University of Buckingham. She serves as chairman of the Salters' Institute, and in 2024 was appointed chairman of the Royal Parks Board.

== Honours ==
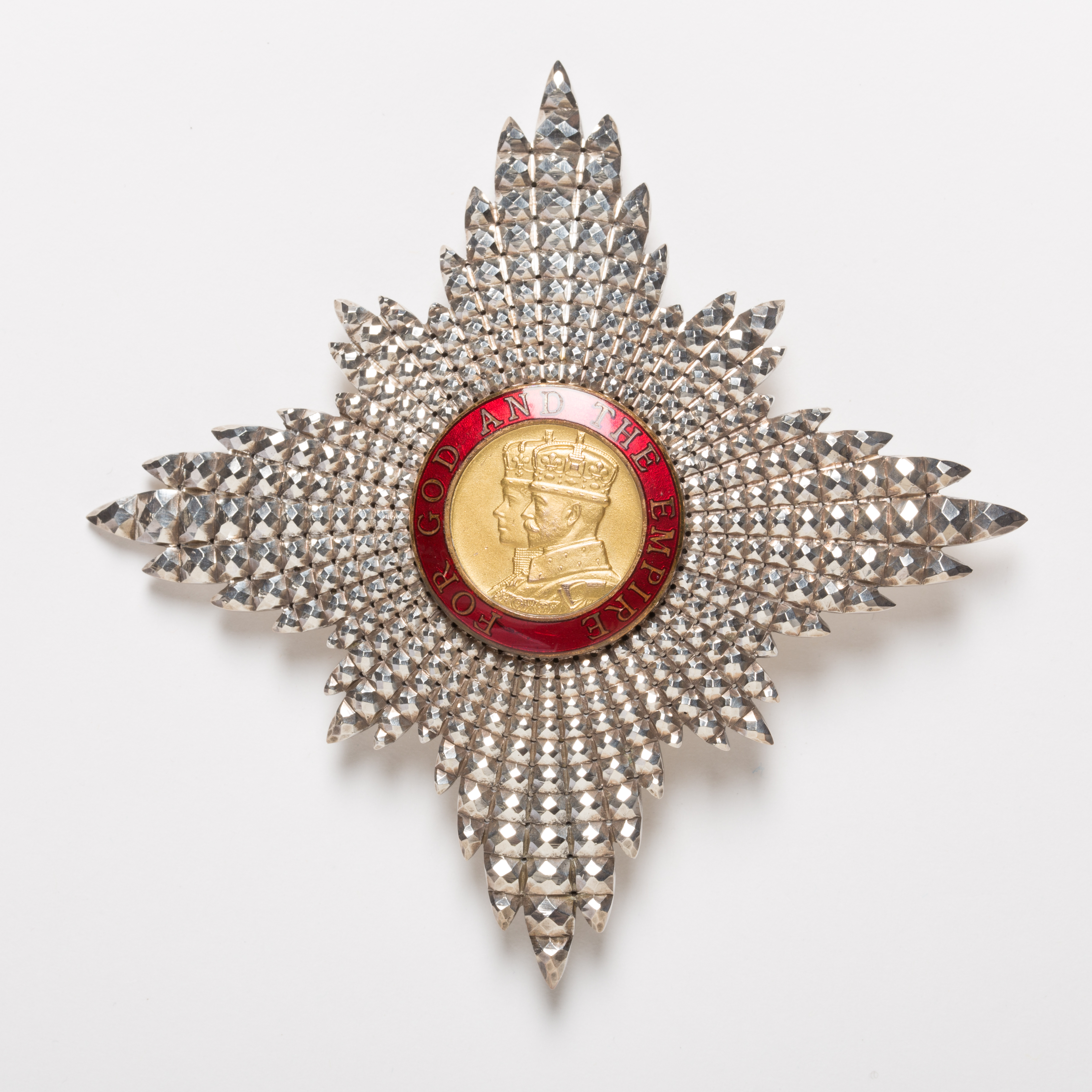
DBE breast star

Appointed Dame Commander of the Order of the British Empire (DBE) in the 2012 Birthday Honours for "services to the National Health Service".
Dame Mary Archer Way, the link road between Addenbrooke's and the Rosie extension, was named by Cambridge City Council in 2013 by way of recognising the achievements of its former chairman.

Archer is a Freeman of the City of London and a liveryman of the Worshipful Company of Salters.

== Personal life ==
She married Jeffrey Archer in July 1966, whom she met at Oxford University when he was studying for a diploma in education.

In 1974, the Archers were struck by a financial crisis when Jeffrey lost over £400,000 in a bad investment. Faced with the threat of bankruptcy, the Archers were forced to move out of their large house in The Boltons. She took up a teaching post at Cambridge University which, together with her husband's eventual success as a novelist, saved them from financial ruin.

In 1987, she gave evidence at the High Court in a libel case brought by her husband against the Daily Star newspaper, which had correctly reported that he had hired a sex worker with whom he had sexual intercourse. In 2001, when Jeffrey Archer was prosecuted for having committed perjury and for perverting the course of justice in the 1987 trial, she appeared at the Old Bailey as a defence witness. Jeffrey Archer was subsequently convicted and imprisoned for perjury and perverting the course of justice. The trial judge, Justice Potts, questioned the veracity of Lady Archer's evidence, suggesting that she too had perjured herself. However, no further action was taken.

In 2003, she sued her former personal assistant, Jane Williams, over her breach of confidentiality. Archer was granted a permanent injunction against Williams plus £2,500 damages, for her claim she misappropriated confidential documents about the Archer family, and had contracted the sale of the personal information to the media which was then published by the Sunday Mirror newspaper. Williams had previously taken Archer to an industrial tribunal on a complaint of unfair dismissal; the complaint was dismissed by the panel in 2002. Lady Archer underwent major surgery for bladder cancer in 2011.

Mary and Jeffrey Archer lived together at the Old Vicarage, Grantchester, near Cambridge, prior to Jeffrey Archer's death on 5 October 2026. They had two sons.

== Other ==
She sings first alto and in 1992 released a CD of Christmas carols, titled A Christmas Carol.

Academic offices
Preceded by The Hon. Lady Keswick	Chancellor; University of Buckingham; 2020–present	Incumbent
