= Cambridge Biomedical Campus =

Science park in Cambridge, UK

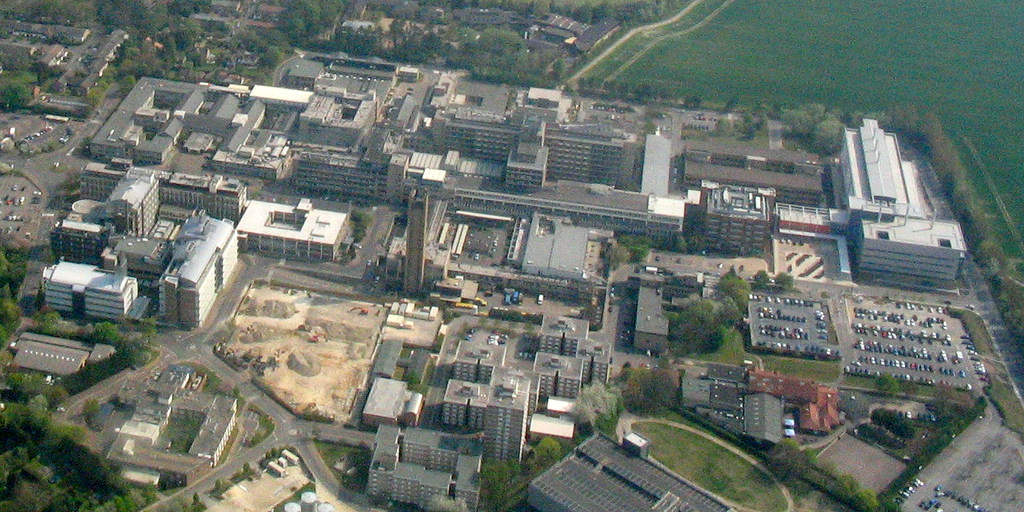
- Aerial view of part of the Cambridge Biomedical Campus
- Affiliations: University of Cambridge; Cancer Research UK; AstraZeneca; National Institute for Health and Care Research; Wellcome Trust; Medical Research Council
- Location: Cambridge, United Kingdom; 52°10′29″N 0°08′18″E
- Website: cambridge-biomedical.com
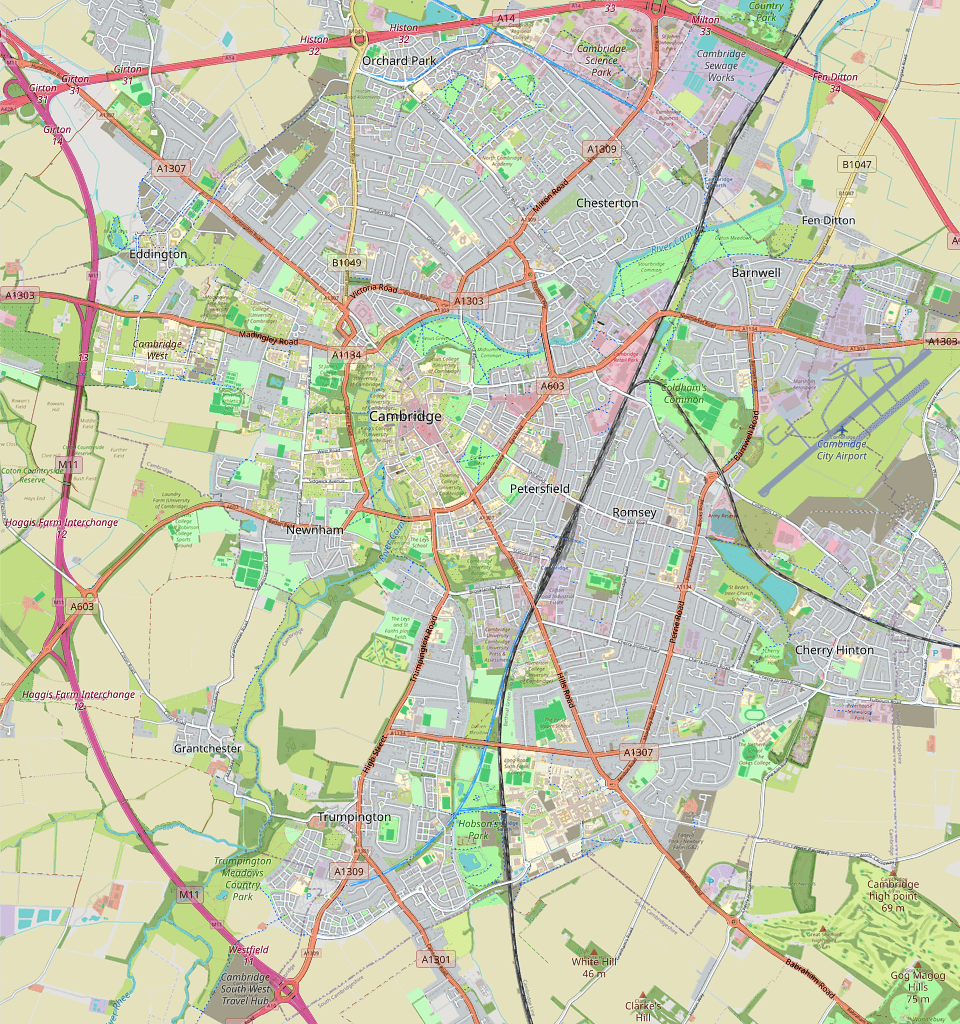
- Location in Cambridge

The Cambridge Biomedical Campus is the largest centre of medical research and health science in Europe. The site is located at the southern end of Hills Road in Cambridge, England.

Over 23,000 people work at the site, which is home to Cambridge University Hospitals NHS Foundation Trust, Royal Papworth Hospital NHS Foundation Trust, AstraZeneca's headquarters, Abcam, the Cambridge Stem Cell Institute, Cancer Research UK, the University of Cambridge's medical school and the Healthcare Improvement Studies Institute, and the United Kingdom's governmental Medical Research Council, which has National Institute for Health and Care Research-designated biomedical research centre status. Cambridge Biomedical Campus is an accredited UK academic health and science centre. The campus has a dedicated railway station, Cambridge South, which opened in June 2026.

== History and development ==
The campus began in 1962, when Addenbrooke's Hospital relocated from the city centre. It has since grown and is recognised in the Cambridge Local Plan as "an international centre of excellence for patient care, biomedical research and healthcare education [which] plays a local, regional and national role in providing medical facilities and medical research."

Within the decade beginning 2020, Addenbrooke's is scheduled to be rebuilt (Addenbrooke's 3) and the new Children's Hospital and Cancer Research Hospital are scheduled to be completed.

The site is served by Cambridge South railway station, the Cambridgeshire Guided Busway and many other bus routes.

== Constituent institutions ==
The Cambridge Biomedical Campus is home to the following institutions.

=== Cambridge University Hospitals NHS Foundation Trust ===
==== Addenbrooke's hospital ====
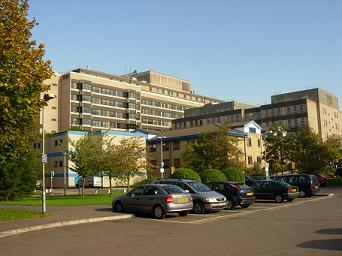
Addenbrooke's Hospital viewed from the south

Addenbrooke's Hospital is a large teaching hospital, and the central focus of the campus.

==== Rosie maternity hospital ====
The Rosie Hospital is Cambridge's first purpose-built maternity hospital, opened in October 1983. A multi-million-pound extension of the Rosie Hospital was completed in 2012.

=== Royal Papworth Hospital NHS Foundation Trust ===
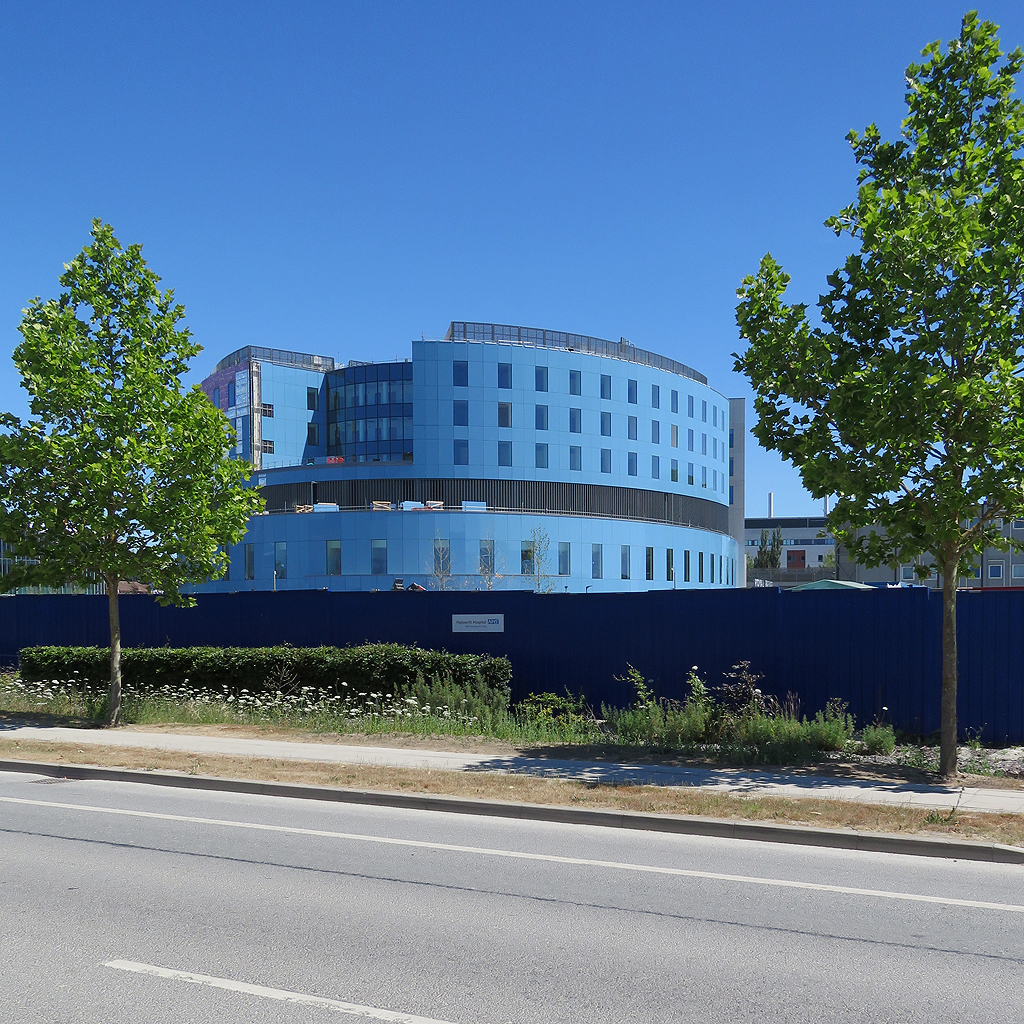
Royal Papworth Hospital

The Royal Papworth Hospital moved to new premises on the Cambridge Biomedical Campus in the spring of 2019.

=== AstraZeneca ===
AstraZeneca's global research and development facility, The Discovery Centre, is located on the campus. It is home to more than 2,000 employees working in medicines discovery and development, in both small molecules and biologics. Research activities span all pre-clinical functional groups, including antibody engineering, medicinal chemistry and high-throughput screening.

=== University of Cambridge School of Clinical Medicine ===
The University of Cambridge Medical School, established in 1976.

=== The Healthcare Improvement Studies Institute ===
The Healthcare Improvement Studies Institute, commonly known as THIS Institute, is a research institute dedicated to improving the quality and safety of healthcare. Through its research, the institute enables better healthcare through better evidence about how to improve. It is part of the University of Cambridge and based within the School of Clinical Medicine.

=== MRC Laboratory of Molecular Biology ===
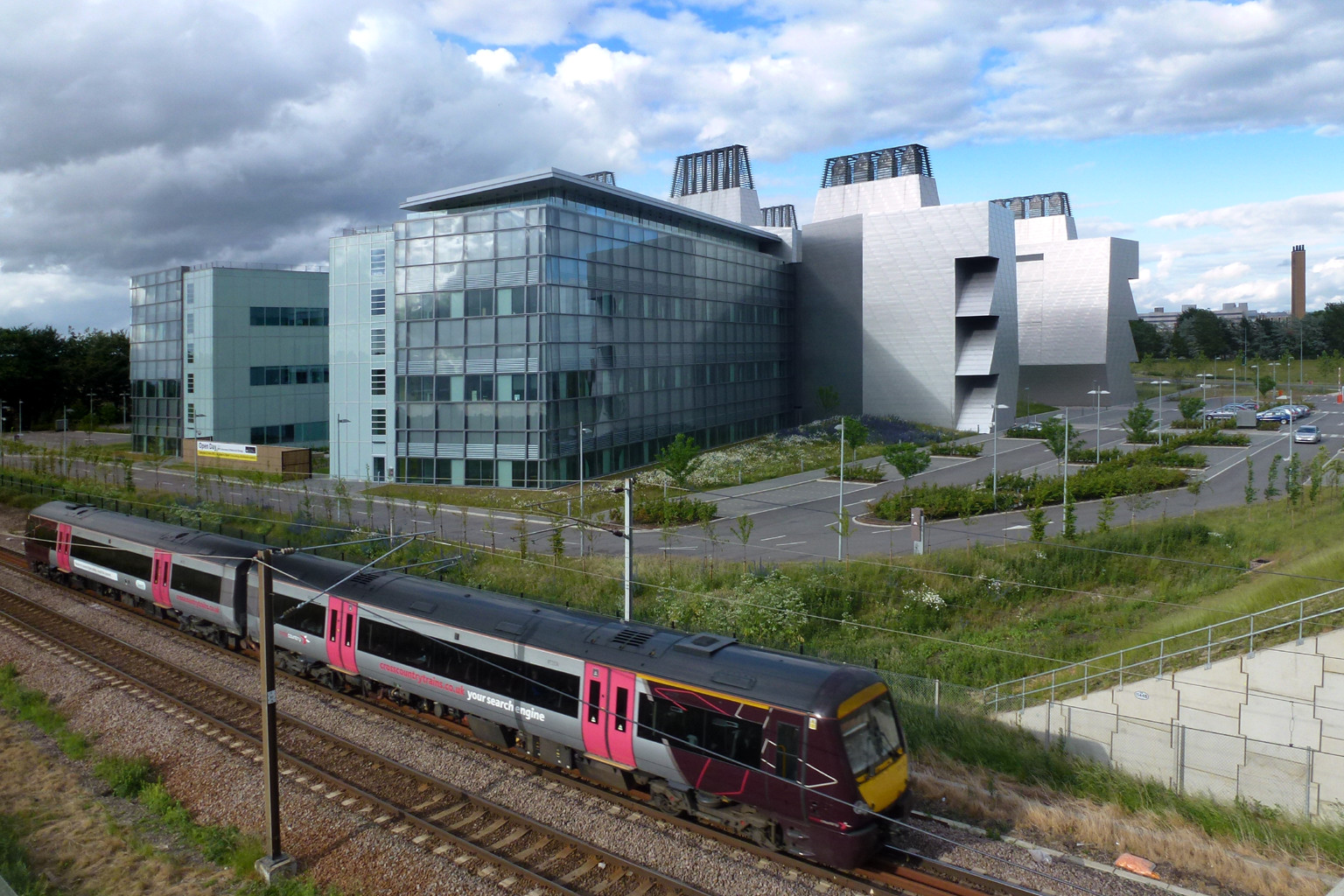
Laboratory of Molecular Biology

The LMB is a molecular biology research institute funded by the UK Medical Research Council. It was founded in Cambridge in 1947 as the Unit for Research on the Molecular Structure of Biological Systems and moved to a site adjacent to Addenbrooke's Hospital in 1962. A 27,000m^{2} replacement building close to the previous site was completed in 2012 and opened in May 2013.

Scientists based at the laboratory have won twelve Nobel Prizes including the 1962 prize (Physiology or Medicine) awarded for the discovery of the double-helix structure of DNA.

=== Cambridge Stem Cell Institute ===
The Cambridge Stem Cell Institute (CSCI) is an institute dedicated to the research on stem cell biology, and is part of the University of Cambridge. It includes around 30 University-based Principal Investigators who study stem cell biology and/or translation.

The aims of CSCI are to:

- make fundamental discoveries that provide new insights into stem cell function and potency;
- understand the role of stem and progenitor cells in disease and thereby to improve diagnosis and treatment;
- harness the capacity of endogenous stem and progenitor cells for repair and regeneration;
- exploit stem cells as tools for studying the molecular pathogenesis of human diseases and discovery of therapeutic agents;
- nurture future generations of stem cell scientists and clinical investigators in an intellectually invigorating mix of basic and translational research.

CSCI was formed in 2012 following an £8 million investment by the Wellcome Trust and the Medical Research Council.

=== Cancer Research UK Cambridge Institute ===
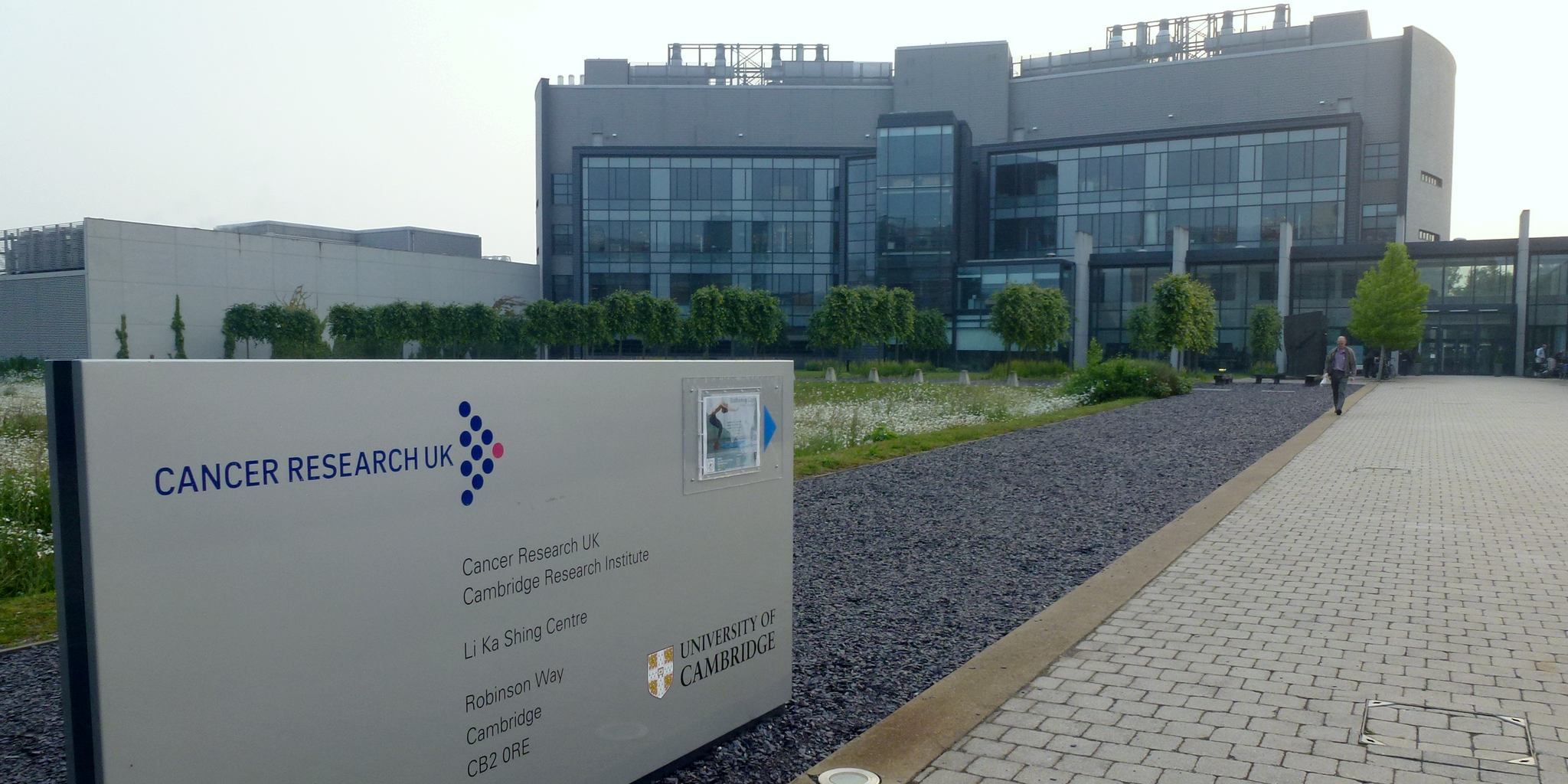
Li Ka Shing Centre of the Cancer Research UK Cambridge Institute

The Cancer Research UK Cambridge Institute is one of four core-funded Cancer Research UK Institutes and a department of the University of Cambridge. In 2018, the department received an annual budget of £45 million, £27.8 million of which came from Cancer Research UK. The institute offers highly competitive PhD programmes; both studentships and clinical research training fellowships (for aspiring clinical academics), attracting applicants from the UK and around the world. Cancer research is a designated University of Cambridge Strategic Initiative.

Research in the institute focuses primarily on tumour ecology and evolution, with investigations across four main areas:

- Basic research, which involves looking into the cellular and molecular biology of cancer.
- Research into molecular imaging, genomics, bioinformatics and biomolecular modeling.
- Research that focuses on specific cancer sites, forming a bridge between the clinical and laboratory areas.
- Clinical investigations and trials, including population based studies into screening and prevention.

The centre was officially opened by Queen Elizabeth II in February 2007. In 2018, Professor Gregory Hannon was announced as the new director, taking over from Professor Simon Tavaré.

Senior group leader at the institute, Professor Richard Gilbertson, is the director of the Cancer Research UK Cambridge Centre, a network that encourages local collaborations between universities, NHS hospitals, and other research organisations.

=== Cambridge Institute for Medical Research ===
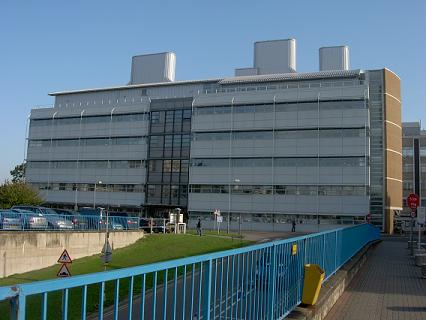
The Wellcome Trust/MRC building, part of the Biomedical Campus housing the Cambridge Institute for Medical Research and the MRC Mitochondrial Biology Unit

The CIMR is a cross-departmental institute in the University of Cambridge, receiving funding from the Wellcome Trust. Research is focused on four main areas: misfolded proteins and disease, intracellular membrane traffic, autoimmune disease and haematopoietic stem cell biology.

=== Wolfson Brain Imaging Centre ===
The Wolfson Brain Imaging Centre was created in 1995 to develop and apply advanced imaging methods to patients with traumatic brain injury. It is unique in being co-located with the Neurosciences Critical Care Unit of Addenbrooke's Hospital. It provides Positron Emission Tomography and Magnetic Resonance Imaging.

=== Hutchison/MRC Research Centre ===
The Hutchison/MRC Research Centre is a cancer research centre housing researchers from the University of Cambridge Department of Oncology, the MRC Cancer Cell Unit, and the University of Cambridge's Cambridge Molecular Therapeutics Programme. It was built in 2001, with funding from the Medical Research Council and a donation to the University of Cambridge from Hutchison Whampoa Ltd. The Hutchison/MRC Research Centre is a member institute of the Cambridge Cancer Centre, a virtual organisation of Cambridge researchers whose work has current or potential application to cancer research.

=== MRC Mitochondrial Biology Unit ===
The MRC Mitochondrial Biology Unit is a department of the School of Clinical Medicine of the University of Cambridge and is funded by the Medical Research Council. It is focused on research to understand mitochondrial process and their involvement in human diseases. It is co-located with the Cambridge Institute for Medical Research in the Wellcome Trust/MRC Building.

=== Institute of Metabolic Science ===
The Institute of Metabolic Science (IMS) is dedicated to research, education, prevention and clinical care in the areas of diabetes, obesity and related metabolic and endocrine diseases. The institute is a joint venture between the University of Cambridge, The Medical Research Council, Cambridge University NHS Hospitals Trust and the Wellcome Trust. It is led by co-directors Professor Sir Stephen O'Rahilly and Professor Nick Wareham. Lead researchers include Krishna Chatterjee, David Dunger, Sadaf Farooqi, Nita Forouhi, Stephen O'Rahilly, Nigel Unwin, Antonio Vidal-Puig, Nick Wareham, and Giles Yeo, among many others.

=== Brain Repair Centre ===
Adjacent to the Institute of Public Health, Cambridge Centre for Brain Repair is a subsidiary of the University of Cambridge Department of Clinical Neurosciences. It is a research institute aiming to "understand, and eventually to alleviate and repair damage to the brain and spinal cord which results from injury or neurodegenerative disease."

=== Cambridge Public Health ===
Cambridge Public Health is an interdisciplinary centre at the University of Cambridge. Based in the School of Technology, Cambridge Public Health is an umbrella organisation for more than 600 researchers and professionals working on public health issues.

Established in 2020, Cambridge Public Health has evolved from, and brings together, elements of the earlier Cambridge Institute of Public Health (CIPH) and all of the PublicHealth @Cambridge Strategic Research Network. CIPH was a partnership between the University of Cambridge, the Medical Research Council and the National Health Service. It was created in 1993 to study disease in the population and to identify, evaluate and monitor public healthcare interventions.

=== Cambridge Academy for Science and Technology ===
The Cambridge Academy for Science and Technology is a secondary school for 14- to 18-year-olds offering GCSE, B-Tech and A-Level courses. It opened in September 2014 in the Deakin Centre as the University Technical College Cambridge. In September 2017, it moved into its own building on Robinson Way, situated next to the Long Road Sixth Form College, and was rebranded as the Cambridge Academy for Science and Technology.
