= Antonio Vidal-Puig =

Spanish medical doctor and scientist

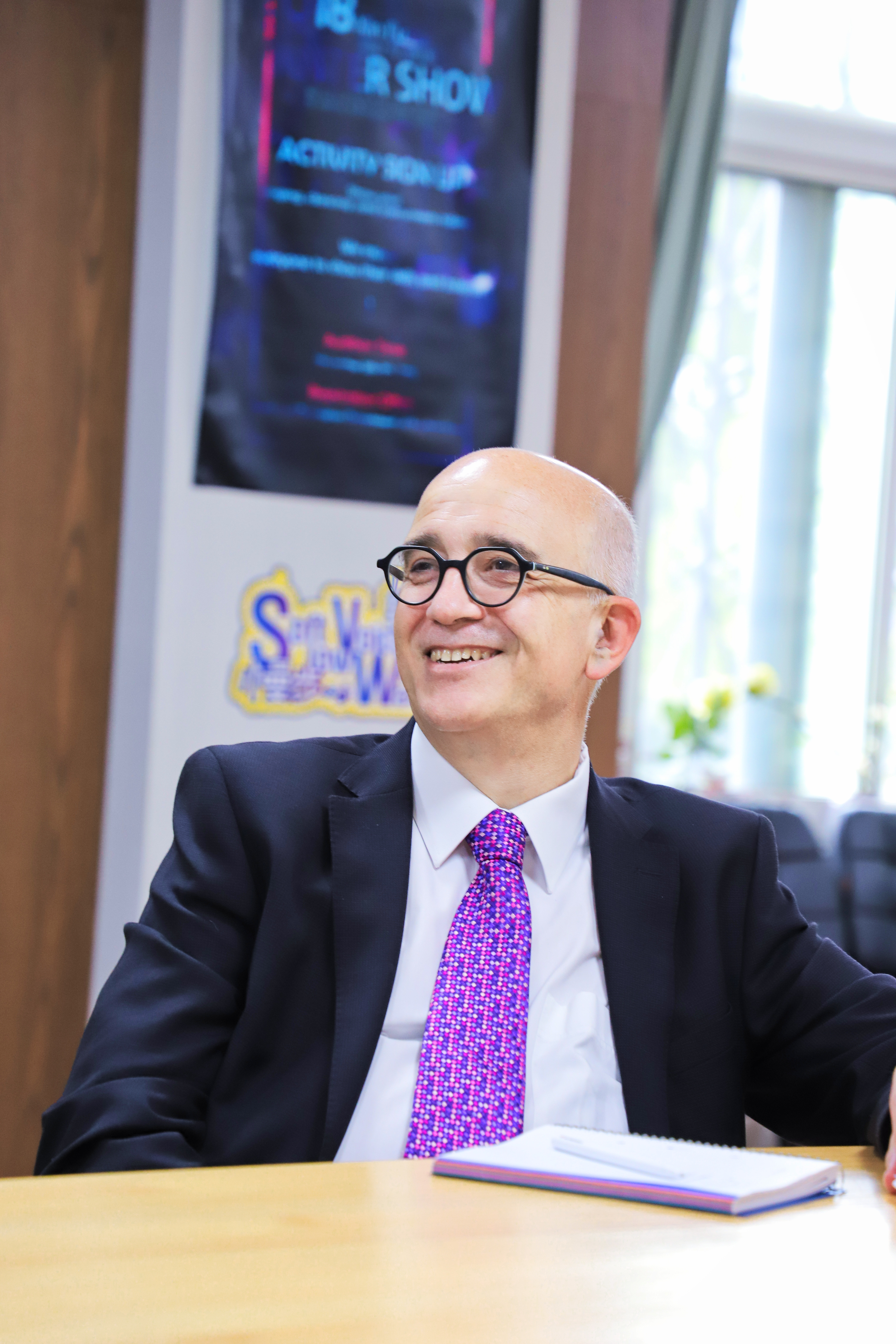
Antonio Vidal-Puig, Spanish scientist

Antonio Vidal-Puig (born Valencia, Spain June 12, 1962) is a Spanish medical doctor and scientist who works as a Professor of Molecular Nutrition and Metabolism at the University of Cambridge (UK), best known for advancing the concept that pharmacological targeting of brown fat may serve to treat overweight and obesity in affected individuals, as well as for introducing the concept of adipose tissue "expandability" as an important factor in the pathogenesis of insulin resistance in the context of positive energy balance. His published work focuses on areas such as adipose tissue metabolism and lipotoxicity, regulation of insulin secretion, and the pathophysiology of metabolic syndrome, obesity, and type 2 diabetes. In April 2024, he was granted the rank of doctor honoris causa from the King Juan Carlos University, Madrid.

== Education ==
Vidal-Puig studied medicine at University of Valencia Medical School, and trained in endocrinology at the University of Granada Medical School. He held post-doctoral positions in Boston at the Massachusetts General Hospital and Beth Israel Hospital, Harvard Medical School, from 1992–1999, where his mentors included Jeff Flier, Brad Lowell, David Moller, and Leo Krall. In 2015 he completed the Executive Master of Business Administration at the Cambridge Judge Business School.

== Career ==
Vidal-Puig established his research laboratory (TVP Lab) at the Institute of Metabolic Science, of the University of Cambridge in 2000, and became a Professor of Molecular Nutrition and Metabolism, as well as an Honorary Consultant in Metabolic Medicine. He is also an Associate Faculty of the Wellcome Sanger Institute. In 2014 he was elected a Fellow of the Academy of Medical Sciences (UK).

Together with Matej Orešič, in 2014 he edited an essay volume "A Systems Biology Approach to Study Metabolic Syndrome".

His academic engagements outside the UK include his affiliation with the Centre on Artificial Intelligence for Humankind at the National University of Singapore Business School. Since 2019 he has been associated with the newly launched Cambridge University Nanjing Centre for Technology. As a visiting professor at Nanjing University, he is engaged in studies concerning aspects of the epidemic of obesity and diabetes occurring in China. He is also a Chair of the Life Sciences Panel and a recipient of a Principal Investigator award of the European Research Council. In 2024 he was named the Toh Chin Chye Visiting Professor at the National University of Singapore.

== Scientific work ==
=== TVP Lab ===
Vidal-Puig's research laboratory in Cambridge is devoted to exploring "the molecular mechanisms involved in controlling energy expenditure, fat deposition, and the mechanisms controlling the partition of energy towards oxidation or storage". More specifically it works on lipotoxic effects on insulin sensitivity, activation of thermogenesis in adipose tissue, molecular mechanisms controlling energy expenditure and brown fat activation, and modulation of fatty acid oxidation in skeletal muscle.

=== Theoretical ===
Novel concepts worked on by Vidal-Puig include:

- Adipose tissue expandability hypothesis. The concept was advanced by him in 2006. According to the hypothesis, the expansion of adipose tissue (AT) is a normal phenomenon when an individual undergoes sustained positive energy balance, providing strategic fuel storage. However, it may reach a threshold beyond which toxic effects ensue: abnormal accumulation of lipids in organs such as muscle, liver, heart, kidney; accumulation of macrophages in AT, and spillover of proinflammatory molecules from metabolically stressed AT (lipotoxicity). These eventually lead to disease states typically accompanying obesity, such as metabolic syndrome, diabetes, atherosclerosis, hypertension, and heart attacks. This expandability concept has gained considerable acceptance among experts.
- Brown fat targeting to treat obesity. Since brown fat burns lipids to produce heat through the uncoupling of its mitochondria (thermogenesis), this phenomenon has been historically suggested as a method to fight obesity. Vidal-Puig's contributions have included studies of the neural, metabolic, and genetic control of the thermogenic uncoupling of adipocyte mitochondria, and the therapeutically oriented testing of possible synthetic activators of such uncoupling. In reports attracting media coverage, his team unveiled the existence of naturally occurring, pro-thermogenic biochemical mechanisms controlling mitochondrial uncoupling in fat cells, a finding with potential use to treat overweight. and control thermogenesis

=== Research topics ===
Research articles where Vidal-Puig is an author will be found in current entries on Adipogenesis, Gene expression profiling, Lipidomics, Lipotoxicity, Macrophages, Metabolic syndrome, Metabolomics, Mitophagy, Nicotinamide phosphoribosyltransferase, Non-alcoholic fatty liver disease, Pyruvate carboxylase, Resistin, Senotherapy, Stearoyl-CoA desaturase-1, Uncoupling protein, UCP2, and UCP3.

=== Research allies ===
Notable Cambridge scientists with whom Vidal-Puig has shared paper authorship include Krishna Chatterjee, Sadaf Farooqi, Nita Forouhi, Giles Yeo, Stephen O'Rahilly, and Nick Wareham.

== Honours ==
Vidal-Puig gave the 2015 FEBS National Lecture, the 2016 Maimonides Lecture Award by the University of Córdoba, and the 2019 Sir Philip Randle Lecture sponsored by the British Biochemical Society.

He has been awarded the Lilly Foundation Distinguished Career Award (2015), the Hippocrates International Award for Medical Research on Human Nutrition given by the Real Academia de Medicina y Cirugía of the Principality of Asturias (2015), and the Society for Endocrinology Medal (2017).
