= Cambridge Hospital =

Cambridge hospital may refer to the following:

== United Kingdom ==
- Cambridge University Hospitals NHS Foundation Trust, an NHS foundation trust which manages the following hospitals in Cambridge, England, United Kingdom
  - Addenbrooke's Hospital
  - Rosie Hospital
- Cambridge Military Hospital, a former 1879 hospital that served the British Army
- Nuffield Health Cambridge Hospital, a private hospital

== Other ==
- Cambridge Hospital (Massachusetts)
