= Stephen O'Rahilly =

Irish-British physician and scientist (born 1958)

Professor Sir Stephen O'Rahilly FRS FRCP FRCPI FMedSci FRSB MRIA
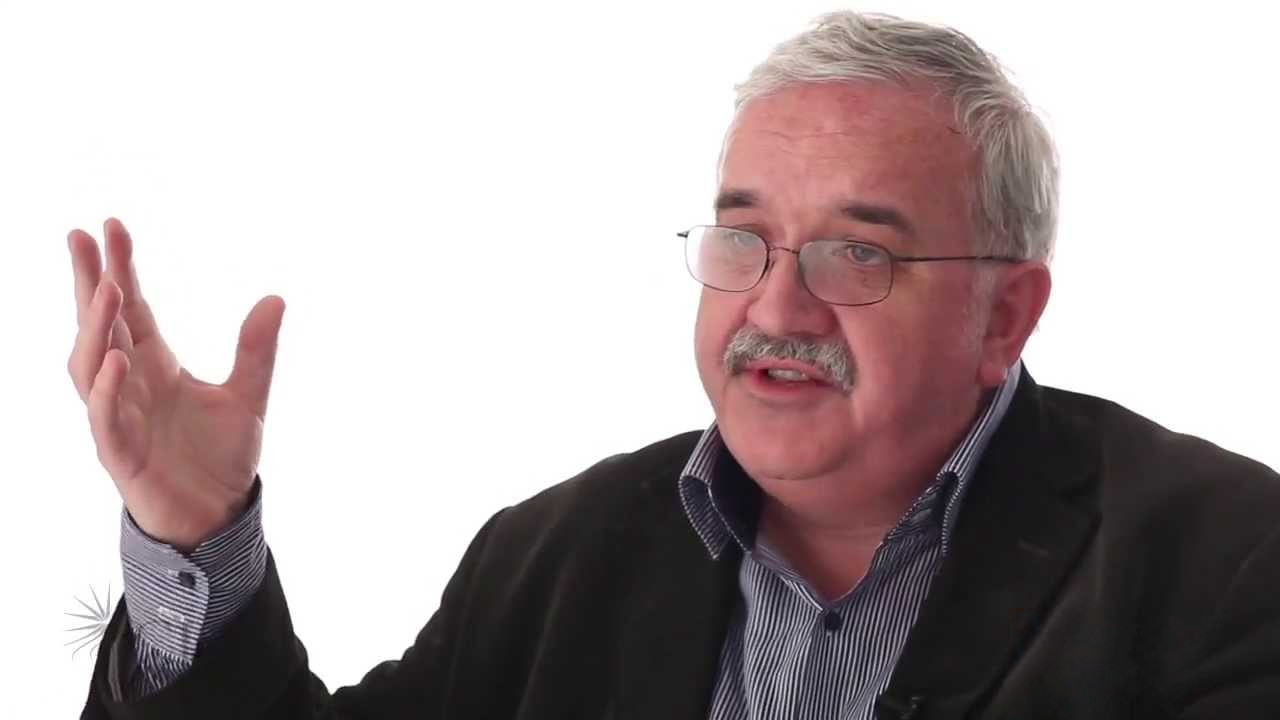
- Born: 1 April 1958 (age 68); Dublin, Ireland
- Citizenship: Ireland; United Kingdom
- Education: University College Dublin (MB, BCh, BAO, MD)
- Awards: FMedSci (1999); Heinrich Wieland Prize (2002); FRS (2003); InBev-Baillet Latour Health Prize (2010); Croonian Medal (2011, 2022); Baly Medal (2013); Knighthood (2013); Debrecen Award for Molecular Medicine (2014); Banting Medal (2019)
- Scientific career
- Fields: Endocrinology & Metabolism
- Workplaces: University of Cambridge; Pembroke College, Cambridge; University of Oxford; Harvard Medical School; University College Dublin; Addenbrooke's Hospital; St Bartholomew's Hospital; Sanger Institute; Hammersmith Hospital
- Website: www.mrl.ims.cam.ac.uk/research/principal-investigators/professor-sir-stephen-orahilly

Sir Stephen Patrick O'Rahilly (born 1 April 1958) is an Irish-British physician and scientist known for his research into the molecular pathogenesis of human obesity, insulin resistance and related metabolic and endocrine disorders.

== Early life and education ==
O'Rahilly was born on 1 April 1958 in Dublin, Ireland. He was educated at Beneavin De La Salle College in Finglas, Dublin. He studied medicine at University College Dublin, graduating in 1981 with Bachelor of Medicine, Bachelor of Surgery, Bachelor of Obstetrics (MB BCh BAO) degrees. He later continued his studies and completed a Doctor of Medicine (MD) degree in 1987.

== Research ==
O'Rahilly undertook research into Type 2 diabetes and insulin resistance at the University of Oxford and Harvard Medical School, before joining the University of Cambridge where he is a professor of Clinical Biochemistry and Medicine, Director of the MRC Metabolic Diseases Unit, co-director of the Institute of Metabolic Science and the scientific Director of the National Institute for Health and Care Research (NIHR) Cambridge Biomedical Research Centre. O'Rahilly is also an Associate Faculty at the Wellcome Trust Sanger Institute and honorary consultant physician at Addenbrooke's Hospital, Cambridge. He is a professorial fellow of Pembroke College, Cambridge.

Notable Cambridge scientists with whom O'Rahilly has shared paper authorship include Krishna Chatterjee, David Dunger, Sadaf Farooqi, Nita Forouhi, Antonio Vidal-Puig, Nick Wareham, and Giles Yeo.

== Awards and honours ==
O'Rahilly was elected to the Academy of Medical Sciences in 1999, the Royal Society in 2003. His nomination reads:

Stephen O'Rahilly has made major contributions to the understanding of the molecular mechanisms underlying human disorders of energy balance and metabolism. His work first established that mutations in single genes could result in severe human obesity and that these defects largely acted through disruption of central satiety mechanisms. These findings have altered clinical approaches to the evaluation of the obese child and have identified a subtype of obesity amenable to dramatically effective therapy. His studies of patients with extreme insensitivity to insulin have also provided new insights into human insulin action and its disruption in states of insulin resistance.

He was awarded the Heinrich Wieland Prize in 2002, the InBev-Baillet Latour Health Prize in 2010 and the Debrecen Award for Molecular Medicine in 2014. He was elected to the US National Academy of Sciences as an Overseas Member in 2011 and to the Academia Europaea in 2022. He delivered the 2016 Harveian Oration at the Royal College of Physicians of London.

O'Rahilly was knighted in the 2013 Birthday Honours for services to medical research.

In 2017, he became a member of the Royal Irish Academy. In 2018, he was made an Honorary Doctor of RCSI University of Medicine and Health Sciences in Dublin. He also holds Honorary Doctorates from the Universities of Dundee, Warwick and Buckingham

In 2019, O'Rahilly was elected as an Honorary Fellow of the Learned Society of Wales (LSW). He was also awarded the Banting Medal for his contributions towards diabetes research by the American Diabetes Association in the same year.

O'Rahilly was awarded the Croonian Medal in 2011 by the Royal College of Physicians. He was awarded it again, by the Royal Society in 2022, this time jointly with Sadaf Farooqi and they presented their lecture at the Royal Society in 2022.

In 2023, O'Rahilly was awarded the OU Health Harold Hamm International Prize for Biomedical Research in Diabetes for his outstanding research into the link between obesity and Type 2 diabetes.

== Personal life ==
O’Rahilly lives in Cambridge, England with his wife, journalist Philippa Lamb, and his stepson Felix Lamb. He was married to Suzy Oakes from 1990 until her death in 2011.
