= Krishna Chatterjee =

British endocrinologist (born 1958)

Krishna Chatterjee CBE FRS FRCP FMedSci
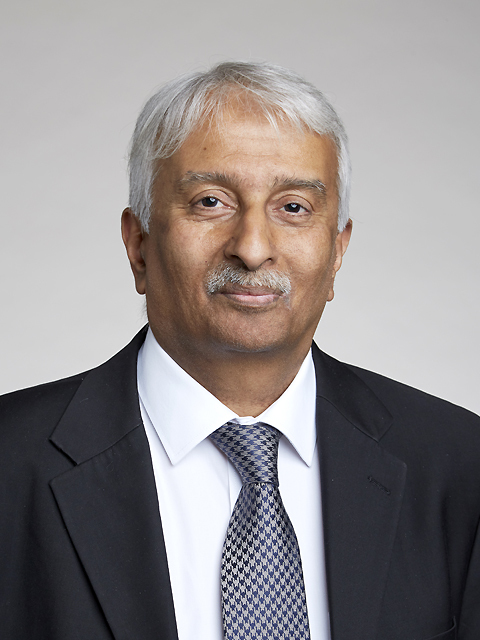
- Chatterjee in 2017
- Born: 23 April 1958 (age 68)
- Education: Wolfson College, Oxford (BA, BMBCh)
- Scientific career
- Fields: Medicine; Endocrinology
- Workplaces: University of Cambridge
- Website: www.mrl.ims.cam.ac.uk/research/principal-investigators/krishna-chatterjee/

Vengalil Krishna Kumar Chatterjee (born 23 April 1958) is a British endocrinologist. He is a professor of endocrinology in the Department of Medicine at the University of Cambridge and a fellow of Churchill College, Cambridge. He is also the director of the Cambridge Clinical Research Centre, part of the National Institute for Health Research (NIHR).

== Education ==
Chatterjee was born on 23 April 1958. He was educated at Wolfson College, Oxford, where he was awarded a Bachelor of Arts degree, and a Bachelor of Medicine, Bachelor of Surgery degree in 1982.

== Research and career ==
Chatterjee is distinguished for his discoveries of genetic disorders of thyroid gland formation, regulation of hormone synthesis and hormone action, which have advanced fundamental knowledge of the hypothalamic–pituitary–thyroid axis. He has identified dominant negative inhibition by defective nuclear receptors as a common mechanism in thyroid hormone resistance and peroxisome proliferator-activated receptor gamma (PPARγ)-mediated insulin resistance. He has shown how deficiency of human selenocysteine-containing proteins causes a multisystem disease, including disordered thyroid hormone metabolism. He seeks to translate such understanding into better diagnosis and therapy of both rare and common thyroid conditions.

Notable Cambridge scientists with whom Chatterjee has shared paper authorship include Sadaf Farooqi, Stephen O'Rahilly, Antonio Vidal-Puig, and Nick Wareham.

Chatterjee was appointed Commander of the Order of the British Empire (CBE) in the 2023 New Year Honours for services to people with endocrine disorders.
