= Isaacson Invitational cup =

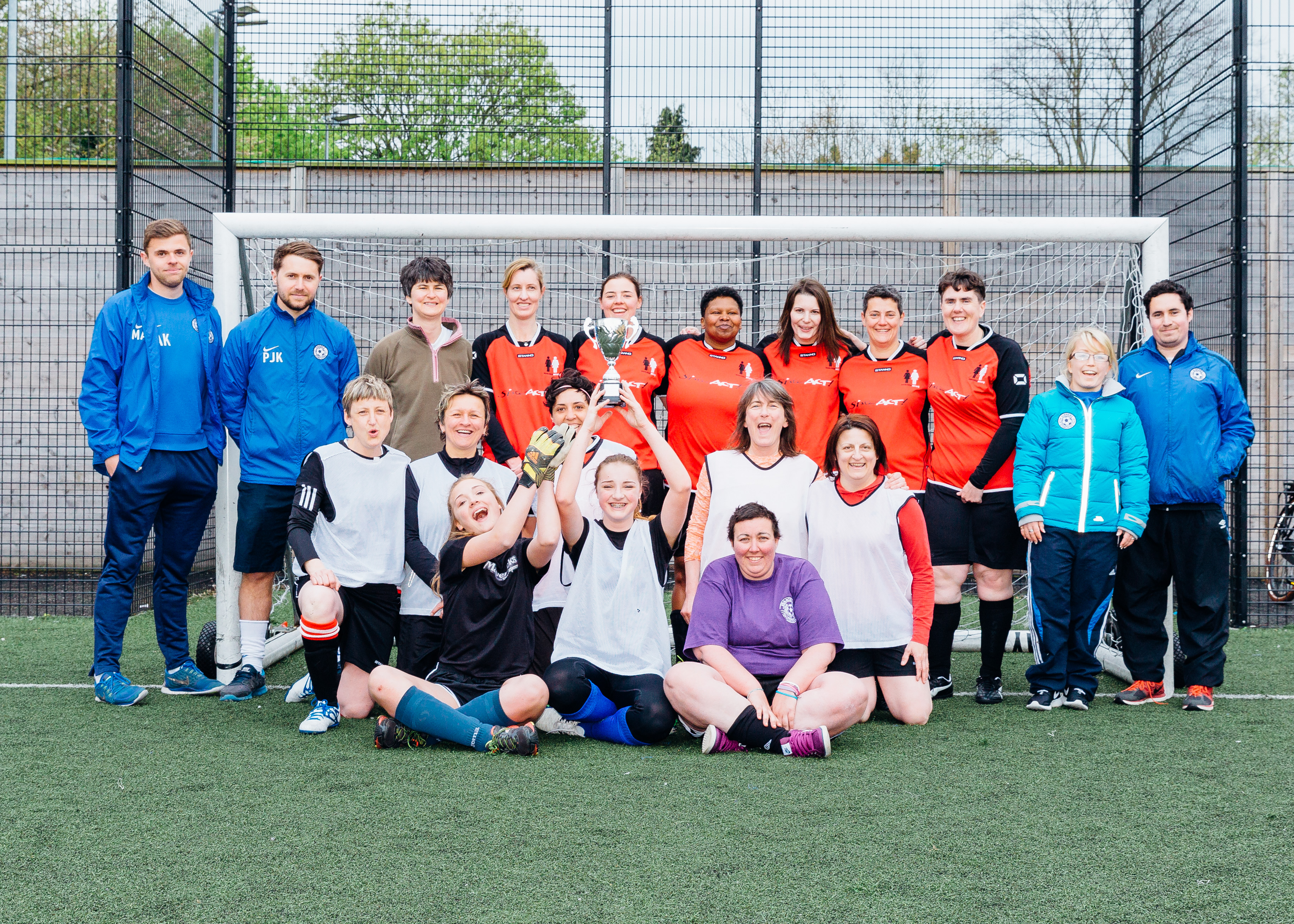
Isaacson Invitational Cup 2016

Sam Isaacson's Invitational Cup is a charity five-a-side football tournament held in Cambridge, England. This tournament is designed to raise funds for cancer research and Addenbrooke's Hospital Oncology Department. Sam Isaacson was diagnosed with terminal cancer in 2015 and since then Sam has been on a quest to raise awareness and money for cancer charities. With the help and support of Kinnerz coaching and Lightside photography. So far, Sam and her friends and supporters have raised £17,000. Alongside the invitational cup, Sam also organizes Kick Cancer Cup - a football event held each year in the autumn which also raises money for cancer-based organizations.
