= Debrecen Award for Molecular Medicine =

The Debrecen Award for Molecular Medicine was established in 2003. With the award the Faculty of Medicine of the University of Debrecen, Hungary aims to recognize extraordinary achievements in the field of biomedicine. Nominees are expected to have made great strides in life sciences leading to remarkable progress in our understanding and more efficient treatment of diseases. The prize amount is set at 10,000 Euros. Each year the decision is reached by secret ballot with all professors of the Faculty of Medicine (University of Debrecen) having the right to participate in the voting.

== Award winners ==
- 2025 Jeffrey M. Friedman
- 2024 Stephen W. Scherer
- 2023 Shimon Sakaguchi
- 2022 Alexander J. Varshavsky
- 2021 Katalin Karikó
- 2020 Dame Frances Mary Ashcroft
- 2019 Valina L. Dawson
- 2018 Sir David Philip Lane
- 2017 Franz-Ulrich Hartl
- 2016 Michael N. Hall
- 2015 Carl June
- 2014 Sir Stephen O'Rahilly
- 2013 Donald M. Bers
- 2012 Shigekazu Nagata
- 2011 Sir Salvador Moncada
- 2010 Yosef Yarden
- 2009 Axel Ullrich
- 2008 Bruce M. Spiegelman
- 2007 Alain Fischer
- 2006 Ralph M. Steinman
- 2005 Thomas A. Waldmann
- 2004 Sir Philip Cohen
- 2003 J. Craig Venter

== See also ==
- List of biomedical science awards
