= Ted M. Dawson =

American neurologist and neuroscientist

Ted M. Dawson (born April 19, 1959) is an American neurologist and neuroscientist. He is the Leonard and Madlyn Abramson Professor in Neurodegenerative Diseases and director of the Institute for Cell Engineering at Johns Hopkins University School of Medicine. He has joint appointments in the Department of Neurology, Neuroscience and Department of Pharmacology and Molecular Sciences.

== Early life and education ==
He graduated with a bachelor's degree from Montana State University in 1981. He earned his M.D. and Ph.D. degrees from the University of Utah School of Medicine in 1986. He furthered his medical training with an Internship in Internal Medicine at the University of Utah Affiliated Hospitals and a Neurology Residency at the Hospital of the University of Pennsylvania. In 1992, Dawson completed a Postdoctoral Fellowship in Neurosciences under Solomon H. Snyder at the Johns Hopkins University School of Medicine.

== Career ==
Dawson began work at The Johns Hopkins University School of Medicine, where he was made assistant professor in the Department of Neuroscience in 1993 and in the Departments of Neurology and Neuroscience in 1994. In 1996, he became an associate professor in the Departments of Neurology and Neuroscience and Graduate Program in Cellular and Molecular Medicine, as well as the co-director of the Parkinson's Disease and Movement Disorder Center. In 1998, Dawson became the director of the Morris K. Udall Parkinson's Disease Research Center of Excellence, a position he currently holds. Still at The Johns Hopkins University School of Medicine, Dawson achieved a professor position in the Departments of Neurology and Neuroscience in 2000. Dawson was a founder and director of the Neuroregeneration and Repair Program at the Institute for Cell Engineering in 2002 and is now the director of the institute. In 2004 he was named the inaugural Leonard and Madlyn Abramson Professor in Neurodegenerative Diseases in the departments of Neurology and Neuroscience at The Johns Hopkins School of Medicine.

He served as the chairman of the scientific advisory board of the Bachman-Strauss Dystonia and Parkinson Foundation. He serves on scientific advisory board (SAB) of the CurePSP. He serves on the Advisory Council of Aligning Science Across Parkinson's and the executive scientific advisory board of the Michael J. Fox Foundation. He is also a member of numerous editorial boards, including the Journal of Clinical Investigation and Cell. He was a founder of AGY Therapeutics. He is a founder and is on the scientific advisory board of Neuraly and Valted Seq, Inc.

In 2022 he was named to the National Academy of Inventors.

=== Neuraly and Valted Seq ===
Neuraly, a Johns Hopkins startup based in Germantown, Maryland, develops drugs for Parkinson's disease and other neurodegenerative disorders. It works on NLY01, "a long-acting glucagon-like peptide-1 receptor agonist that penetrates the brain and has shown promise as a neuroprotective agent". The 2018 Series A funding round was backed by Korean companies and funds such as D&D Pharmatech, Smilegate Investment, InterVest, LB Investment, Magna Investment, Geon Investment, Dongkoo Bio&Pharma as well as two American venture capital funds Octave Life Sciences, and Maryland Venture Fund. According to Parkinson News Today, Neuraly and Valted Seq together with Precision Molecular, and Theraly Fibrosis, function as the four branches of Korean company D&D Pharmatech.

== Research ==
Dawson works closely with his wife and partner, Valina L. Dawson. The research performed in their laboratories studies the molecular mechanisms that lead to neuronal cell death in neurodegenerative diseases, stroke and trauma. They discovered the role of nitric oxide (NO) in neuronal injury in stroke and excitotoxicity along with their mentor Solomon H. Snyder. The Dawsons showed that NO derived from neuronal NO synthase and immunologic NO synthase leads to degeneration of dopamine neurons in models of Parkinson's disease through cell autonomous and non-cell autonomous affects, respectively. They identified the mechanisms by which NO kills neurons through poly (ADP-ribose) polymerase. They discovered that poly (ADP-ribose) (PAR) polymer, the byproduct of PARP activation, is a novel cell death signaling molecule that plays a critical role in neuronal injury through apoptosis inducing factor and activation of nuclease activity of macrophage migration inhibitory factor in a cell death pathway designated parthanatos. They showed that poly (ADP-ribose) glycohydrolase, which degrades PAR polymer is an endogenous inhibitor of parthanatos. In screens for neuroprotective proteins, they discovered an endogenous inhibitor of parthanatos, Iduna (RNF146), a first in class PAR-dependent E3 ligase. In the same screens, they also discovered Thorase, an AAA+ ATPase that regulates glutamate (AMPA) receptor trafficking and discovered that Thorase is an important regulator of synaptic plasticity, learning and memory. Variants in Thorase were found to be linked to schizophrenia and expression of these variants in mice lead to behavioral deficits that are rescued by the AMPA receptor antagonist Perampenal. They also showed that mutations in Thorase leading to gain or loss of function result in lethal developmental disorders in children. Botch was also discovered as an important inhibitor of Notch signaling via deglycation of Notch preventing Notch's intracellular processing at the level of the Golgi, playing an important role in neuronal development.

The Dawsons have also been at the forefront of research into the biology and pathobiology of the proteins and mutant proteins linked to Parkinson's disease. They showed that parkin is a ubiquitin E3 ligase that is inactivated in patients with genetic mutations in parkin and that it is also inactivated in sporadic Parkinson's disease via S-nitrosylation and c-Abl tyrosine phosphorylation leading to accumulation of pathogenic substrates. They have also shown the c-Abl plays a prominent role in the pathogenesis of Parkinson's disease due to pathologic α-synuclein. They discovered the parkin substrate, PARIS, which plays a key pathogenic role in PD pathogenesis by inhibiting mitochondrial biogenesis. They showed that DJ-1 is an atypical peroxidoxin-like peroxidase and that its absence in PD leads to mitochondrial dysfunction. The Dawsons showed that mutations in LRRK2 cause PD through pathologic kinase activity leading to enhanced protein translation via the phosphorylation of the ribosomal protein s15 and that inhibiting LRRK2 kinase activity is protective. In collaborative studies, they identified Rab35 as the key Rab linked to LRRK2 neurotoxicity. Their labs also discovered that pathologic α-synuclein spreads in the nervous system via engagement with the lymphocyte-activation gene 3 (LAG3). In further collaborative studies, they discovered that Glucagon-like peptide-1 receptor (GLP1R) agonist, NLY01, prevents neuroinflammaory damage induced by pathologic α-synuclein in Parkinson's disease via inhibition of microglia and prevention of the conversion of resting astrocytes to activated A1 astrocytes. These studies are providing major insights into understanding the pathogenesis of PD and are providing novel opportunities for therapies aimed at preventing the degenerative process of PD and other neurologic disorders.

Dawson has published over 550 publications and has an H-index of 150.

== Awards ==
- Ruth Salta Junior Investigator Achievement Award, for Outstanding Contribution in Alzheimer's Disease Research
- The Paul Beeson Physician Faculty Scholars in Aging Research Program
- Elected to the American Neurological Association
- Derek Denny-Brown Young Neurological Scholar Award, American Neurological Association
- International Life Sciences Institute Award
- Santiago Grisoliá Chair and Medal
- Elected to the Association of American Physicians
- Elected Fellow, American Association for the Advancement of Science
- Thomson Reuters Highly Cited Researcher
- Thomson Reuters Worlds' Most Influential Scientific Minds
- Javits Neuroscience Investigator Award
- Elected Fellow of the National Academy of Inventors
- Elected Fellow of the American Neurological Association
- Elected Fellow of the American Academy of Neurology
- Elected Fellow of the American Heart Association
- Distinguished Professorship, Xiangya Hospital, Central South University, Changsha, China
