= Addenbrooke's Charitable Trust =

- Founded: 2005
- Location: Addenbrooke's Hospital, Cambridge, England
- Key people: Stephen Davies - Chief Executive
- Website: www.act4addenbrookes.org.uk

Addenbrooke's Charitable Trust (ACT; established 2005) is a charity based at Addenbrooke's Hospital and the Rosie Hospital, Cambridge, UK. Addenbrooke's Charitable Trust (ACT) registered charity number is 1048868.
