= Cambridge University Health Partners =

Geography
- Location: Cambridge, United Kingdom

Organisation
- Care system: NHS
- Type: Academic health science centre

History
- Founded: 2009

Links
- Website: www.cuhp.org.uk

Cambridge University Health Partners is an academic health science centre that brings together the University of Cambridge, Anglia Ruskin University, Cambridge University Hospitals NHS Foundation Trust, Royal Papworth Hospital NHS Foundation Trust and Cambridgeshire and Peterborough NHS Foundation Trust. It is largely located on the Cambridge Biomedical Campus, on the southern border of Cambridge, England.

== History ==
The creation of Cambridge University Health Partners was announced by the then health secretary Alan Johnson in March 2009.

In September 2022, Cambridge University Health Partners was involved in what is believed to be UK's first demonstration of genomic data federation by connecting the trusted research environments of NIHR Cambridge Biomedical Research Centres and Genomics England as part of a UK Research & Innovation-funded project involving University of Cambridge, NIHR Cambridge BRC, Genomics England, Lifebit, and Eastern Academic Health Science Network.
