= Nita Forouhi =

British physician and academic

- Education: Newcastle University; London School of Hygiene and Tropical Medicine
- Scientific career
- Fields: Nutrition, Epidemiology
- Workplaces: University of Cambridge
- Thesis: The relationship between body fat distribution, insulin sensitivity and postprandial lipids in Europeans and South Asians: a cross-sectional study (2000)
- Website: Research page

Nita Gandhi Forouhi is a British physician and academic, specialising in nutrition and epidemiology. She is Professor of Population Health and Nutrition at the University of Cambridge, the programme leader of the nutritional epidemiology programme of its MRC Epidemiology Unit, and an honorary consultant public health physician with Public Health England.

== Education and early career ==
Forouhi studied medicine at Newcastle University: she also completed an intercalated Bachelor of Medical Science (BMedSci) degree in immunology. She then trained in general medicine, and diabetes and endocrinology in Edinburgh, and gained her Membership of the Royal Colleges of Physicians of the United Kingdom (MRCP). She studied for a master's degree and a Doctor of Philosophy (PhD) degree at the London School of Hygiene & Tropical Medicine, having been awarded a Wellcome Training Fellowship. She completed her doctorate in 2000 with a thesis titled "The relationship between body fat distribution, insulin sensitivity and postprandial lipids in Europeans and South Asians: a cross-sectional study".

== Research ==
Her research focuses on the connections between diet, nutrition and the risk of diabetes, obesity and related disorders. She appears often in British media discussing nutritional research and their relevance to health, and according to BMJ Confidential, "she is known for giving evidence based and balanced views" on such topics.

Notable Cambridge scientists with whom she has shared paper authorship include Stephen O'Rahilly, Nigel Unwin, Antonio Vidal-Puig, and Nick Wareham.

== Leadership ==
As of 2019, she was a member of the International Diabetes Federation Diabetes Atlas Committee, a member of the UK Scientific Advisory Committee on Nutrition – NHS England – Diabetes UK working group to review the evidence on lower carbohydrate diets for adults with type 2 diabetes, and an expert for NICE guidelines, a member of the board of the directors of the Public Health Genomic Foundation at Cambridge, and a member of the Diabetes UK research committee.

== Awards and honours ==
- University of Cambridge Impact Award, 2016
- Rank Nutrition Named Lecture, Diabetes UK, 2017
- Senior Investigator, National Institute for Health Research, 2021
- Elected Fellow of the Academy of Medical Sciences, 2024
