= Novosco =

British information technology company

Novosco was an information technology company based in Belfast, Northern Ireland, founded by Patrick McAliskey in 2007. It had sales of £21.4 million in 2016, and £23.7 million in 2017.

Novosco signed a contract with Cambridge University Hospitals NHS Foundation Trust for the introduction of new hardware, IT infrastructure, Wi-Fi, and cyber security at a cost of £107 million in June 2018. At the time, it employed 180 people, mainly based at its Belfast headquarters, but it planned to recruit 114 new staff to be located in Belfast, with 32 others based closer to Manchester.

Novosco ran an IT infrastructure summer camp in partnership with Ulster University, and sponsors the Novosco Grand Prix, an annual series of 10 km running races in Northern Ireland.

In October 2019, Novosco was acquired by German group Cancom in a £70 million deal.
