= Joanna Bauldreay =

British chemist

- Education: University of Southampton; University of Cambridge
- Scientific career
- Workplaces: Royal Dutch Shell
- Doctoral advisor: Mary Archer

Joanna Bauldreay is a British chemist and Aviation Fuel Development Manager at Shell Global Solutions.

== Early life and education ==
Bauldreay studied Natural Sciences at Newnham College, Cambridge, matriculating in 1976. She was awarded a Half Blue for cricket, and continues to play sports. Bauldreay joined the University of Southampton for her graduate studies, earning a master's degree in Electrochemical Science. She completed her PhD at Newnham College, Cambridge, under the supervision of Mary Archer.

== Research and career ==
In 1986, after a postdoctoral position at Rice University in Houston, Texas, Bauldreay joined the Royal Dutch Shell Group. She is Fuel Development Manager at Shell Global Solutions. She is considered an expert in aviation fuel. She has a number of patents, covering liquid kerosene. She explores a range of emerging technologies, including synthetic kerosine containing aromatics, alcohol-to-jet, hydrotreated depolymerised cellulosic jet and aqueous phase reforming.

She was awarded a 2017 International Association for Stability, Handling and Use of Liquid Fuels (IASH) Lifetime Achievement award for her technical advancements in petroleum- and synthetic based jet fuel.
