= Quantum photoelectrochemistry =

Quantum photoelectrochemistry is the investigation of the quantum mechanical nature of photoelectrochemistry, the subfield of study within physical chemistry concerned with the interaction of light with electrochemical systems, typically through the application of quantum chemical calculations. Quantum photoelectrochemistry provides an expansion of quantum electrochemistry to processes involving also the interaction with light (photons). It therefore also includes essential elements of photochemistry. Key aspects of quantum photoelectrochemistry are calculations of optical excitations, photoinduced electron and energy transfer processes, excited state evolution, as well as interfacial charge separation and charge transport in nanoscale energy conversion systems.

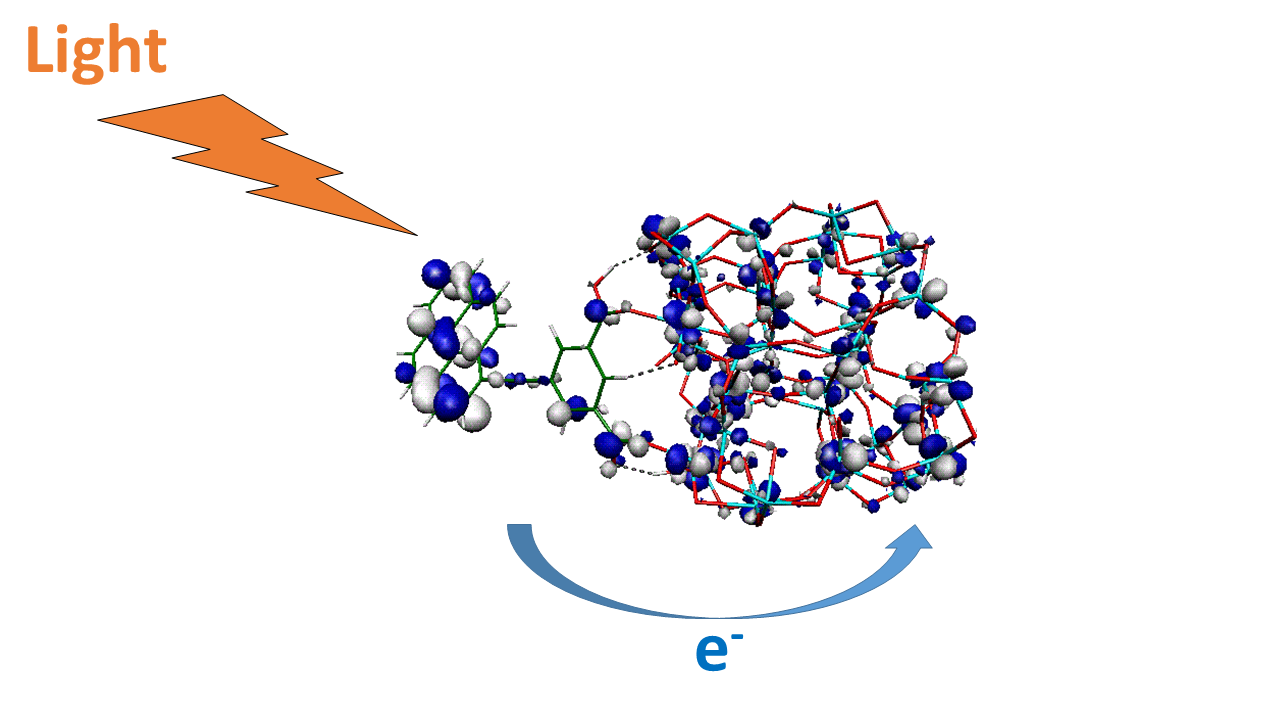
Quantum photoelectrochemistry calculation of photoinduced interfacial electron transfer in a dye-sensitized solar cell.

Quantum photoelectrochemistry in particular provides fundamental insight into basic light-harvesting and photoinduced electro-optical processes in several emerging solar energy conversion technologies for generation of both electricity (photovoltaics) and solar fuels. Examples of such applications where quantum photoelectrochemistry provides insight into fundamental processes include photoelectrochemical cells, semiconductor photochemistry, as well as light-driven electrocatalysis in general, and artificial photosynthesis in particular.

Quantum photoelectrochemistry constitutes an active line of current research, with several publications appearing in recent years that relate to several different types of materials and processes, including light-harvesting complexes, light-harvesting polymers, as well as nanocrystalline semiconductor materials.
