= Solar energy conversion =

Conversion to other forms of energy

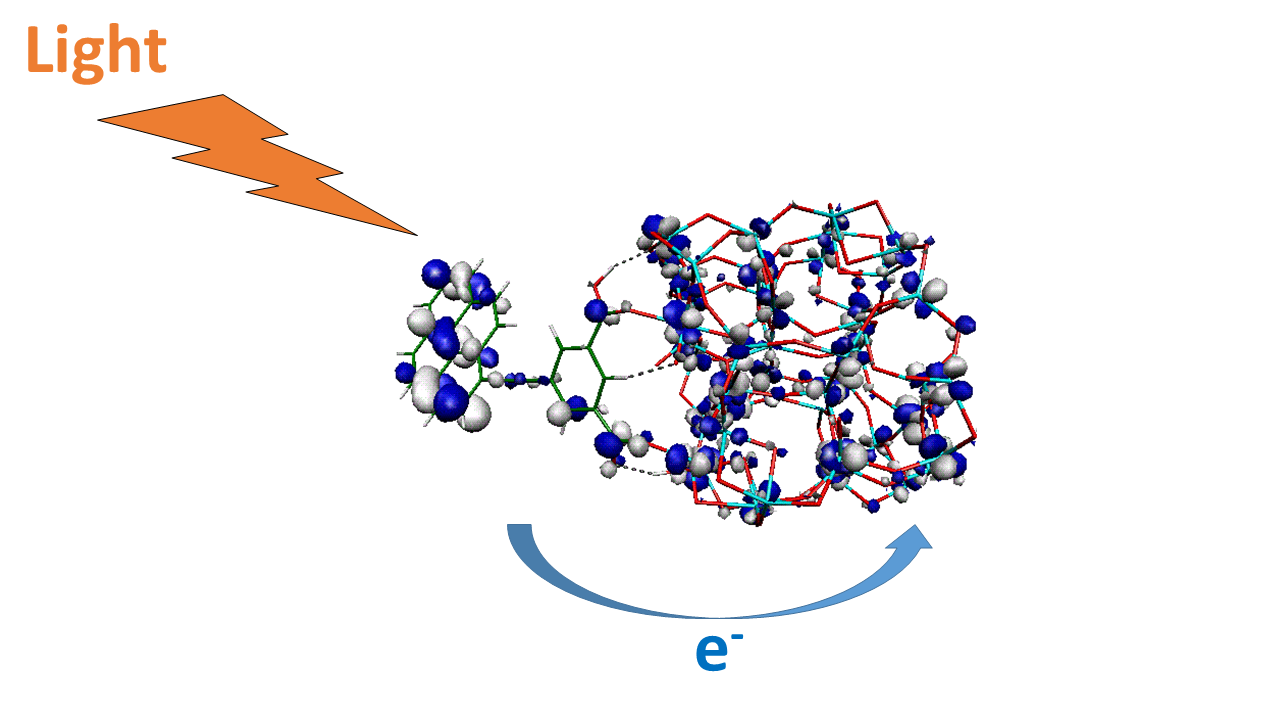
Quantum photoelectrochemistry calculation of photoinduced interfacial electron transfer in a dye-sensitized solar cell.

Solar energy conversion describes technologies devoted to the transformation of solar energy to other (useful) forms of energy, including electricity, fuel, and heat. It covers light-harvesting technologies including traditional semiconductor photovoltaic devices (PVs), emerging photovoltaics, solar fuel generation via electrolysis, artificial photosynthesis, and related forms of photocatalysis directed at the generation of energy rich molecules.

Fundamental electro-optical aspects in several emerging solar energy conversion technologies for generation of both electricity (photovoltaics) and solar fuels constitute an active area of current research.

== History ==
Solar cells started in 1876 with William Grylls Adams along with an undergraduate student of his. A French scientist, by the name of Edmond Becquerel, first discovered the photovoltaic effect in the summer of 1839. He theorized that certain elements on the periodic table, such as silicon, reacted to the exposure of sunlight in very unusual ways. Solar power is created when solar radiation is converted to heat or electricity. English electrical engineer Willoughby Smith, between 1873 and 1876, discovered that when selenium is exposed to light, it produced a high amount of electricity. The use of selenium was highly inefficient, but it proved Becquerel's theory that light could be converted into electricity through the use of various semi-metals on the periodic table, that were later labelled as photo-conductive material. By 1953, Calvin Fuller, Gerald Pearson, and Daryl Chapin discovered the use of silicon to produce solar cells was extremely efficient and produced a net charge that far exceeded that of selenium. Today solar power has many uses, from heating, electrical production, thermal processes, water treatment and storage of power that is highly prevalent in the world of renewable energy.

== Background ==
By the 1960s solar power was the standard for powering space-bound satellites. In the early 1970s, solar cell technology became cheaper and more available ($20/watt). Between 1970 and 1990, solar power became more commercially operated. Railroad crossings, oil rigs, space stations, microwave towers, aircraft, etc. Now, houses and businesses all over the world use solar cells to power electrical devices with a wide variety of uses. Solar power is the dominant technology in the renewable energy field, primarily due to its high efficiency and cost-effectiveness. By the early 1990s, photovoltaic conversion had reached an unprecedented new height. Scientists used solar cells constructed of highly conductive photovoltaic materials such as gallium, indium, phosphide and gallium arsenide that increased total efficiency by over 30%. By the end of the century, scientists created a special type of solar cells that converted upwards of 36% of the sunlight it collected into usable energy. These developments built tremendous momentum for not only solar power, but for renewable energy technologies around the world.

== Electricity production ==
Diagram of the setup of a photovoltaic collection array.

Photovoltaics (PV) use silicon solar cells to convert sunlight into electricity through the photoelectric effect, which results in the emission of electrons. Concentrated solar power (CSP) uses lenses or mirrors with tracking devices to focus a large area of sunlight into a small beam. Solar power is anticipated to become the world's largest source of electricity by 2050. Facilities such as the Ivanpah Solar Power Plant in the Mojave Desert produce over 392 MW, while projects exceeding 1 GW (1 billion watts) are in development and expected to shape the future of solar power in the United States.

== Thermal energy ==
The sun bombards the earth with billions of charged nanoparticles with an immense amount of energy stored in them. This energy can be used for water heating, space heating, space cooling and process heat generation. Many steam generation systems have adapted to using sunlight as a primary source for heating feed water, a development that has greatly increased the overall efficiency of boilers and many other types of waste heat recovery systems. Solar cookers use sunlight for cooking, drying and pasteurization. Solar distillation is used for water treatment processes to create potable drinking water, which has been an extremely powerful player in providing countries in need with relief efforts through the use of advancing technology.

== Economic development ==
Solar energy conversion has the potential to be a very cost-effective technology. It is cheaper as compared to non-conventional energy sources. The use of solar energy help to increase employment and development of the transportation & agriculture sector. Solar installations are becoming cheaper and more readily available to countries where energy demand is high, but supply is low due to economic circumstances. A 1 GW solar power plant can produce almost 10 times as much power as a fossil fuel combustion power plant that would cost twice as much to establish. Solar power plants have been projected to be the leader of the energy production by the year 2050.

=== Rural energy access ===
Solar energy conversion has the potential for many positive social impacts, especially in rural areas that did not previously have grid-based energy access. In many off-grid areas, the solar-electric conversion is the fastest growing form of energy procurement. This is especially true at latitudes within 45° north or south of the Equator, where solar irradiance is more constant throughout the year and where the bulk of the developing world's population lives. From a health perspective, solar home systems can replace kerosene lamps (frequently found in rural areas), which can cause fires and emit pollutants like carbon monoxide (CO), nitric oxides (NOx), and sulfur dioxide (SO2) that adversely affect air quality and can cause impair lung function and increase tuberculosis, asthma, and cancer risks. In such areas, solar energy access has been shown to save rural residents the time and money needed to purchase and transport kerosene, thereby increasing productivity and lengthening business hours.

In addition to energy access, these communities gain energy independence, meaning they are not reliant on a third-party electricity provider. The concept of energy independence is relatively new; for the vast majority of the 20th century, energy analyses were purely technical or financial and did not include social impact analysis. A 1980 study concluded that access to renewable energy would promote values conducive to larger societal benefit as opposed to personal promotion. While some academics argue that historically the parties in control of energy sources are those that create social hierarchies, this type of analysis became less "radical" and more mainstream after the introduction of technologies that enabled solar energy conversion.

=== Community solar ===
Solar energy conversion can impact not only just individual customers but whole communities. In a growing number of neighborhoods across America, the conventional model of independent, non-connected rooftop installations is being replaced by community-sized solar microgrids. The idea of "community solar" first became popular because of issues regarding energy storage. Because as of 2018 the wide-scale production of lithium-ion battery and other storage technologies lags the progress of rooftop PV installations, a main issue preventing a nationwide shift to rooftop solar energy generation is the lack of a reliable, single-home storage system that would provide contingencies for night-time energy use, cloud cover, curtailments and blackouts. Additionally, financing solar installations for single homes may be more difficult to secure given a smaller project scope and lack of access to funds. A viable alternative is to connect blocks of homes together in a community microgrid, using more proven large storage installations, thus lowering barriers to solar adoption. In some cases, a microgrid "web" is made by connecting each independent rooftop PV house to a greater storage facility. Other designs, primarily where rooftop installations are not possible, feature a large combined solar array + storage facility located on an adjacent field. As an added social impact, this form of installation makes solar energy economically viable for multi-family homes and historically low income neighborhoods.

=== Grid defection ===
A potential socioeconomic drawback associated with solar energy conversion is a disruption to the electric utility business model. In America, the economic viability of regional "monopoly" utilities is based on the large aggregation of local customers who balance out each other's variable load. Therefore, the widespread installation of rooftop solar systems that are not connected to the grid poses a threat to the stability of the utility market. This phenomenon is known as Grid Defection. The pressure on electric utilities is exacerbated by an aging grid infrastructure that has yet to adapt to the new challenges posed by renewable energy (mainly regarding inertia, reverse power flow and relay protection schemes). However, some analysts make the case that with the steady increase in natural disasters (which destroy vital grid infrastructure), solar microgrid installation may be necessary to ensure emergency energy access. This emphasis on contingency preparation has expanded the off-grid energy market dramatically in recent years, especially in areas prone to natural disasters.

== Environmental impact ==
Installations can destroy and/or relocate ecological habitats by covering large tracts of land and promoting habitat fragmentation. Solar facilities constructed on Native American reservations have interrupted traditional practices and have also had negative impact on the local ecosphere.
