= Valina L. Dawson =

American neuroscientist

Valina L. Dawson (born August 5, 1961) is an American neuroscientist who is the director of the Programs in Neuroregeneration and Stem Cells at the Institute for Cell Engineering at the Johns Hopkins University School of Medicine. She has joint appointments in the Department of Neurology, Neuroscience and Physiology. She is a member of the Graduate Program in Cellular and Molecular Medicine and Biochemistry, Cellular and Molecular Biology.

== Biography ==
Dawson grew up in the Sonoma Valley Wine Country in California. Dawson received her B.S. in environmental toxicology in 1983 from the University of California, Davis. She earned her Ph.D. in pharmacology and toxicology from the University of Utah School of Medicine. Postdoctoral training was conducted at the University of Pennsylvania and the National Institute on Drug Abuse Addiction Research Center. Dawson joined the faculty at Johns Hopkins University School of Medicine in 1994 as an assistant professor in the departments of Neurology, Neuroscience and Physiology. In 2001, she became an associate professor in the departments of Neurology, Neuroscience and Physiology and served as the vice chair of faculty development in the department of Neurology. Dawson was promoted to the position of professor in the departments of Neurology, Neuroscience and Physiology in 2001. In 2002, she founded the Neuroregeneration Program in the Institute of Cell Engineering and became director of the Stem Cell Program in 2009. She was named a Daniel Nathans Innovator in 2017. She served the Society for Neuroscience as a reviewing editor (2003–2009) and then as a senior editor (2010–2016) for the Journal of Neuroscience and is now serving as an advisory board editor for the other society journal, eNeuro. She also served the Society for Neuroscience on the Committee on Women in Neuroscience (2007–2010), professional development committee (2009–2011) and the program committee (2011–2014). She serves on the scientific advisory board of the New York Stem Cell Foundation, the Weill Cornell Burke Medical Research Institute the external advisory board for the Interdepartmental Neuroscience (NUIN) graduate training program at Northwestern University, and the advisory board for NeuroMab. She was a founder of AGY Therapeutics. She is a founder and is on the scientific advisory board of Neuraly and Valted, LLC.

== Research ==
Dawson works closely with her husband and partner, Dr. Ted M. Dawson. Their research studies the molecular mechanisms that lead to neuronal cell death in neurodegenerative diseases, stroke and trauma. They discovered the critical role the gaseous transmitter, nitric oxide (NO), plays in glutamate excitotoxicity and stroke with their postdoctoral mentor, Dr. Solomon H. Snyder. They defined the role for NO generated from neuronal NO synthase or immunologic NO synthase leads in models of HIV dementia and Parkinson's disease. Exploring the signaling cascade led to the identification of peroxynitrite as the nitrogen oxide moiety that mediates neurotoxicity, and the role for poly(ADP-ribose) polymerase (PARP) as the next step in the neurotoxic cascade. They discovered that poly (ADP-ribose) polymer (PAR) is a novel cell death signaling molecule that plays a critical role in neuronal injury. Her research team discovered that PAR leads to cell death by facilitating the release of apoptosis inducing factor (AIF) factor from the mitochondrial surface. Parsylated AIF then recruits macrophage migration inhibitory factor (MIF) and the complex translocates to the nucleus where the nuclease activity of MIF leads to large scale DNA fragmentation. To distinguish this form of cell death from other cell death signaling cascades it was named Parthanatos, for PAR and the Greek god of death, Thanatos. The enzyme that degrades PAR, poly (ADP-ribose) glycohydrolase, is not only an endogenous negative regulator of parthanatos, but required for cell viability. In genetic screens to find cell signals that prevent neurotoxicity, her team discovered an endogenous inhibitor of parthanatos, Iduna (RNF146), a first in class PAR-dependent E3 ligase. In the same screens, Botch was discovered which is an important inhibitor of Notch signaling via deglycination of Notch preventing Notch's intracellular processing at the level of the Golgi, playing an important role in neuronal development and survival. They also discovered Thorase, an AAA+ ATPase that regulates glutamate (AMPA) receptor trafficking and discovered that Thorase is an important regulator of synaptic plasticity, learning and memory. Genetic variants of Thorase were found in schizophrenic patients. Expression of these variants in mice lead to behavioral deficits that were normalized with the AMPA antagonist Parampenal. Mutations in Thorase leading to gain or loss of function result in lethal developmental disorders in children.

With the discovery of gene mutations that are the cause of rare familial cases of Parkinson's disease, their research team has probed the biologic and pathologic actions of these proteins. They discovered parkin was an E3 ligase that is inactive in patients with genetic mutations in parkin, and that it is also inactive in sporadic Parkinson's disease due to protein modifications by S-nitrosylation and c-Abl tyrosine phosphorylation which led to the discovery of the pathogenic targets, PARIS and AIMP2. PARIS regulates the machinery critical to mitochondrial quality control and thus cell survival. Surprisingly, AIMP2 directly interacts with PARP and activates Parthanatos. Since there are PARP inhibitors in clinical use this finding may provide a new therapeutic target for the treatment of Parkinson's disease. They discovered that DJ-1, which is dysfunctional in Parkinson's disease, is an atypical peroxidoxin-like peroxidase and that its loss of function in PD leads to mitochondrial dysfunction. The Dawson's discovered that mutations in LRRK2 increase its kinase activity and that inhibition of LRRK2 kinase activity is protective in models of Parkinson's disease. The increase in LRRK2 kinase activity leads to enhanced protein translation via the phosphorylation of the ribosomal protein s15. Understanding this shift in the proteome due to altered translation will allow new insight into the alteration in expression of critical proteins that likely underlie the pathogenesis of Parkinson's disease. ArfGAP regulates the GTPase activity of LRRK2 and they discovered that ArfGAP and LRRK2 reciprocally regulate the activity of each other determining neuronal viability. Their labs also discovered that pathologic α-synuclein spreads in the nervous system via engagement with the lymphocyte-activation gene 3 (LAG3). They discovered that Glucagon-like peptide-1 receptor (GLP1R) agonist, NLY01 prevents neuroinflammatory damage induced by pathologic α-synuclein in Parkinson's disease via inhibition of microglia and prevention of the conversion of resting astrocytes to activated A1 astrocytes. Their work continues to provide critical insights into understanding of the pathogenesis of PD and identify new opportunities for therapies to treat patients with Parkinson's disease. Valina Dawson has published over 400 publications and has an H-index of 129.

== Awards ==
- Debrecen Award for Molecular Medicine (2019)
- Distinguished professorship, Xiangya Hospital, Central South University, Changsha, China
- Danial Nathans Innovator Award
- Thomson Reuters Highly Cited Researcher and Worlds Most Influential Minds,
- Elected Fellow of the American Heart Association (F.A.H.A.)
- Elected Fellow of the American Association for the Advancement of Science
- Elected to the American Neurological Association, Fellow
- Javits Neuroscience Investigator Award
- Potter Lectureship, Thomas Jefferson University
- Frontiers in Clinical Neuroscience American Academy of Neurology
