= Cambridge University Hospitals NHS Foundation Trust =

NHS Foundation trust

- Type: NHS foundation trust
- Established: 1 July 2004
- Headquarters: Hills Road, Cambridge
- Hospitals: Addenbrooke's Hospital; Rosie Hospital
- Chair: Baroness Sally Morgan
- Chief executive: Roland Sinker
- Staff: 10,132
- Website: www.cuh.nhs.uk

Cambridge University Hospitals NHS Foundation Trust is an NHS foundation trust located in Cambridge, England. The trust provides healthcare for people in the Cambridge area, in eastern England, and specialist services such as transplantation, treatment of rare cancers and neurological intensive care for a much wider area. It is located on the Cambridge Biomedical Campus and runs Addenbrooke's Hospital and the Rosie Hospital. It is a member of the Shelford Group, an informal organisation of ten leading English university teaching hospitals.

== History ==
It was established on 4 November 1992, as Addenbrooke's National Health Service Trust, and authorised as an NHS foundation trust under its current name on 1 July 2004.

Roland Sinker is the current chief executive; Sinker joined the trust in 2015 moving from King's College Hospital NHS Foundation Trust in London where he was acting CEO. He had previously been the chief operating officer from 2009 to 2015.

In March 2025, it was announced that around 500 non-clinical roles were to be axed within the trust in order to save money.

== Research ==
Cambridge University Hospitals sits in the heart of the Cambridge Biomedical Campus and is part of the internationally renowned research campus which has seen a huge expansion over the last 20 years. The hospital is a partner in one of six designated academic health science centres, Cambridge University Health Partners, formed with Royal Papworth Hospital NHS Foundation Trust, Cambridgeshire and Peterborough NHS Foundation Trust and the University of Cambridge. Research is central to the role and function of this specialist teaching hospital. In 2017, it was awarded £114 million from the National Institute for Health and Care Research (NIHR) to the Cambridge Biomedical Research Centre, a research partnership with the University of Cambridge. There are approximately 1,000 research studies underway at one time covering a range of health conditions including common conditions like diabetes and heart disease, through to specialist research in rare dementias and rare cancers. The hospital has a number of high-specification facilities, equipment and resource to support all of this activity, including the recently expanded Cambridge Clinical Research Facilities offering 24/7 clinical beds to support Phase I and Phase II studies. In addition there is support to set up and initiate studies from the Cambridge Clinical Trials Unit, the Research & Development Department, the Cambridge BioResource and in processing and managing studies an onsite pharmacy and BioRepository. Cambridge is one of 13 Genomic Medicine Centres, and the lead site for the East of England Genomic Medicine Centre, part of the 100,000 Genomes Project which is sequencing whole genomes of people with rare diseases and cancers.

== Performance ==
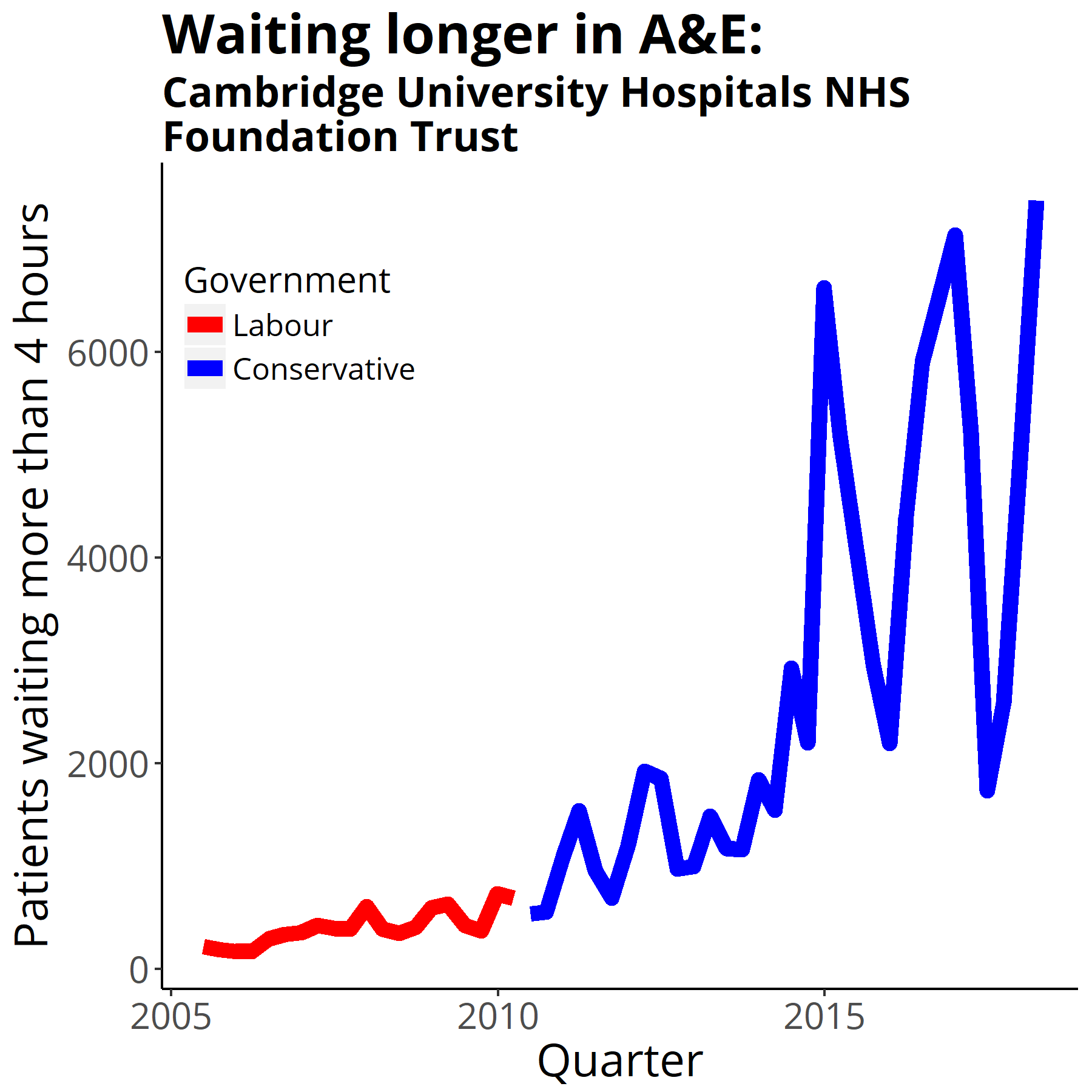
Four-hour target in the emergency department quarterly figures from NHS England Data from https://www.england.nhs.uk/statistics/statistical-work-areas/ae-waiting-times-and-activity/

The trust was one of 26 responsible for half of the national growth in patients waiting more than four hours in accident and emergency over the 2014/15 winter. The trust spent £13.2 million on agency staff in 2014/5. Performance against the target in November 2019 was the worst since 2009. Only 92 per cent of patients were seen within four hours.

The Care Quality Commission placed the trust in special measures in September 2015. This was a surprising move and generated considerable publicity and controversy. The chief executive, Dr Keith McNeil and the finance director resigned. Its sudden failure has been blamed on shortages of staff and an increased use of agency staff, which increased costs and reduced quality and on the new Epic electronic health record system. Waiting times for treatment increased and as many as 200 beds were occupied by patients who were medically fit for discharge, so that the hospital was repeatedly unable to admit patients. It projected a loss of £64 million for 2015/16.

In December 2015, staff were told payment of their salaries was dependent on a loan from the Department of Health. In February 2016 it was expecting a deficit of £39.7 million for the year.

In September 2015, the trust was placed in special measures after Care Quality Commission inspectors deemed it inadequate. It was taken out of special measures in January 2017, following a visit from inspectors the previous September. The Care Quality Commission has since given the Trust a rating of "good".

At the end of March 2017, the trust was confirmed as one of four additional NHS Global Digital Exemplars; joining the twelve announced in September 2016.

It plans a deficit of £93 million for 2018-19, and has outstanding loans of £263 million.

Roland Sinker, the chief executive, warned staff in November 2021 that patients could be sent to hospitals in Birmingham or London if it could not tackle an ongoing bed crisis and that he was 'anxious and scared' that its main acute site was under so much pressure from the COVID-19 pandemic in England that it was "ceasing to function as a hospital" as 150 beds out of 900 were out of action.

It has set up a service called Enhanced Reviews in Care Homes (EnRICH) which has reduced hospital admissions of residents from care homes by 23% and saved 1,300 inpatient bed days in a year.

== Accommodation ==
The trust has 825 on-site bedrooms for staff and in 2022 is planning to increase that number, as the cost of local accommodation is causing recruitment problems, especially for nursing and midwifery staff. 60 offices could be returned to residential use.

== Digitisation ==
As part of its eHospital transformation, the trust installed an Epic Systems electronic health record system in 2014, which together with a Hewlett-Packard infrastructure transformation, will cost the trust £200 million over ten years. The Epic implementation is the first end-to-end deployment of Epic in Europe, as well as the first Epic implementation in the UK. 2.1 million records were transferred to it and it went live on 26 October. In the weeks after Go-Live, it experienced significant teething problems. There were particular problems with communicating pathology results with both the new Epic system and the system used by The Pathology Partnership, the newly formed joint venture pathology provider. The trust reported ongoing issues with pathology codes and reporting leading to difficulty matching test results to patients, requiring re-checking. "GPs were asked to stop all routine blood tests at short notice; patients were attending their GP surgery for blood tests and had to be turned away. Some tests that had already been taken had to be discarded and GPs had to repeat them. The trust has apologised to GPs' patients and The Pathology Partnership has written to GPs giving details of the 200 patients affected". Chief information officer, Dr Afzal Chaudhry, said "well over 90% of implementation [had] proceeded successfully".

Dr Chaudhry has described the difficulties of computerising clinical practice in some detail. "If you take some of the senior consultants who'd never left notepad and books. They'd trained as a student, used them as junior doctors all the way through and some of these people, they'd been there for years. Then overnight we took everything that they knew, then threw it away." The trust has installed 6,000 new PCs and 395 workstations on wheels with a battery pack and 24 inch widescreen monitors capable of moving all around the hospital.

It was the first Trust to receive the Healthcare Information and Management Systems Society Stage 6 Award in November 2015 for the effective use of technology in providing high quality patient care within a year of going live, the fastest in the UK.

In June 2018 the trust announced that it was abandoning its £140 million contract with Hewlett Packard Enterprise which was supposed to run until 2020 and had signed a new contract with Novosco, a Belfast based company, for the introduction of new hardware, IT infrastructure, Wi-Fi, and cyber security at a cost of £107 million.

== Private finance initiative ==
The trust made a Private Finance Initiative deal in 2007 for the building of a £76 million elective care centre. It is required to pay £9 million a year for 30 years to Key Health Services (Addenbrookes) Ltd. which is owned by 3i and NIBC Bank.

== See also ==
- List of NHS trusts
- Healthcare in Cambridgeshire
