= Rosie Hospital =

- Cambridge University Hospitals NHS Foundation Trust
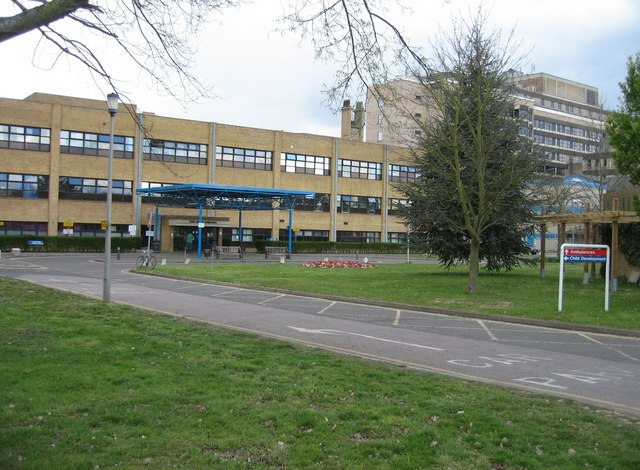
- Rosie Maternity Hospital

- Shown in Cambridgeshire

Geography
- Location: Cambridge Biomedical Campus, Cambridge, England
- Coordinates: 52.1737°N 0.1392°E

Organisation
- Care system: NHS
- Type: Specialist
- Affiliated university: University of Cambridge Medical School

Services
- Emergency department: No
- Beds: 120
- Speciality: Maternity

History
- Founded: 1983

Links
- Website: www.cuh.nhs.uk/rosie-hospital/
- Lists: Hospitals in England

The Rosie Hospital is a maternity hospital in Cambridge. It is managed by the Cambridge University Hospitals NHS Foundation Trust.

== History ==
The facility originates from the Central Union Poor House Infirmary which was established on Mill Road in the 19th century. This establishment became the County Municipal Infirmary in 1930, developed into a maternity hospital in the 1940s and then joined the National Health Service as the Mill Road Maternity Hospital in 1948.

A new purpose-built facility, established with a significant donation from local philanthropist David Robinson and named after his mother, was opened on Addenbrooke's Hospital's Hills Road site in October 1983. A major expansion of the Rosie Hospital was opened by the Queen and the Duke of Edinburgh in May 2013 and 5,000 babies had been born there by November 2016.

== Services ==
The facility is located adjacent to Addenbrooke's Hospital and contains 120 maternity and women's beds. It has its own theatre suite, fetal assessment unit, ultrasound department, and neonatal intensive care unit. It is the regional centre of excellence for maternity care.

== See also ==
- Healthcare in Cambridgeshire
- List of hospitals in England
- Portland Hospital
- Queen Charlotte's and Chelsea Hospital
