= Sadaf Farooqi =

British consultant physician

Sadaf Farooqi FRS FMedSci
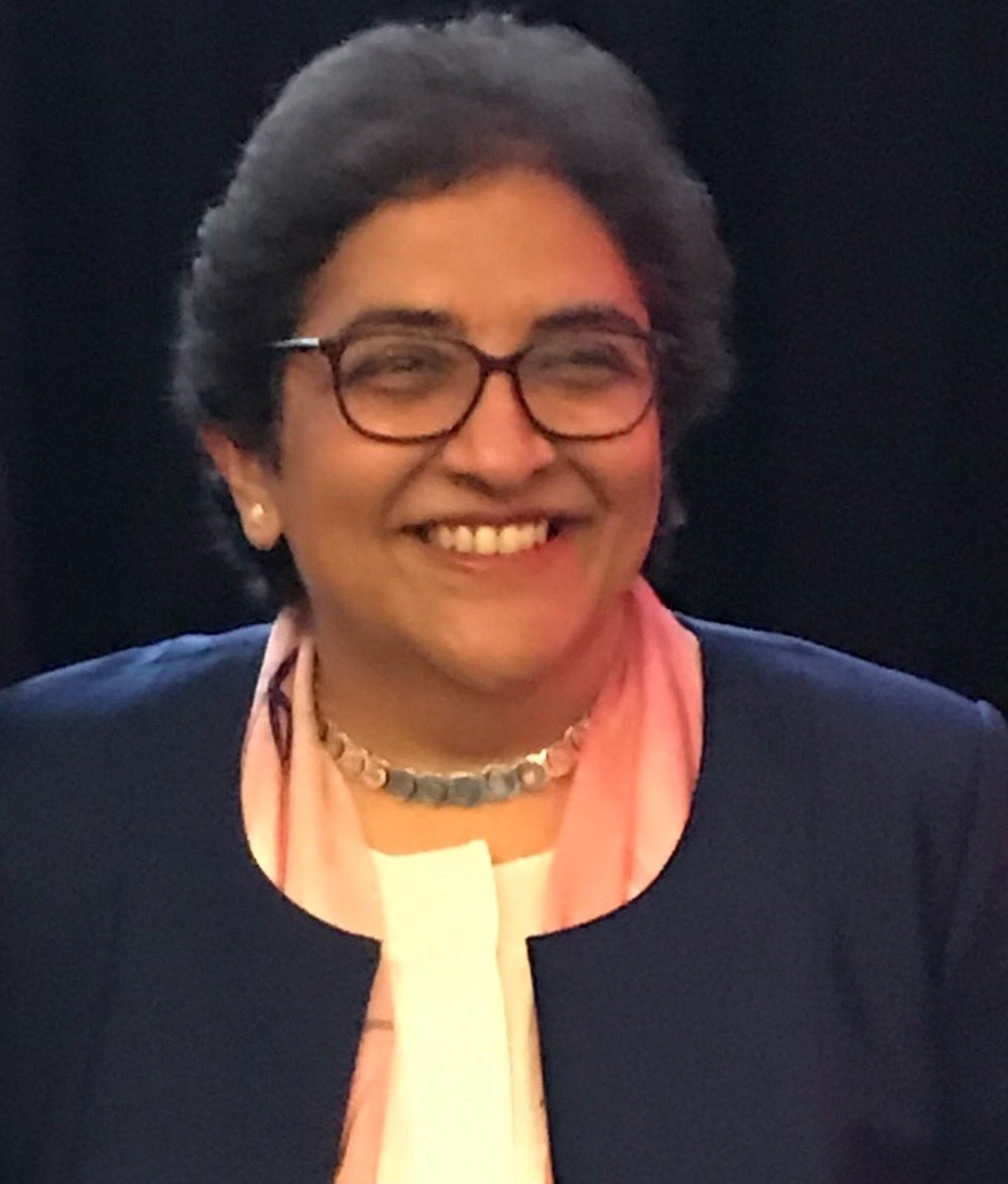
- Professor Sadaf Farooqi at the American Diabetes Association's 79th Scientific Session, June 2019
- Born: Ismaa Sadaf Farooqi
- Education: University of Birmingham (MBChB); University of Cambridge (PhD)
- Known for: Genetics of obesity
- Scientific career
- Fields: Obesity; Genetics; Metabolism
- Workplaces: University of Oxford; John Radcliffe Hospital; University of Cambridge; Addenbrooke's Hospital
- Thesis: Genetics of severe childhood obesity (2001)
- Website: www.mrl.ims.cam.ac.uk/research/principal-investigators/i-sadaf-farooqi/

Ismaa Sadaf Farooqi FRS FMedSci is a Wellcome Trust Senior Research fellow in Clinical Science, professor of Metabolism and Medicine at the University of Cambridge and a consultant physician at Addenbrooke's Hospital in Cambridge, UK.

== Education ==
Farooqi was educated at the University of Birmingham where she studied medicine, and was awarded a Bachelor of Medicine, Bachelor of Surgery degree in 1993. After working as a pre-registration house officer and senior house officer, she moved into research and was awarded a PhD in 2001 from the University of Cambridge for research on the genetics of severe childhood obesity.

== Research ==
Farooqi's research investigates the genetics of obesity. Using candidate genes found in patients with severe obesity, her research group have identified patients with mutations in genes encoding leptin, the leptin receptor and biological targets of leptin action, such as the Melanocortin 4 receptor (MC4R). Her group have also demonstrated that the central leptin-melanocortin axis plays a critical role in the regulation of human food intake. Research in her laboratory has shown that people who carry variants of the MC4R gene have an increased preference for high fat food (such as certain recipes of chicken korma), but a decreased preference for sugary foods like Eton mess.

Her research has also proven that mutations in the KSR2 gene are associated with insulin resistance and that genetic variation in the fat mass and obesity-associated protein (FTO) is associated with diminished hunger. Her research has been funded by the Wellcome Trust, Addenbrooke's Charitable Trust and the Framework Programmes for Research and Technological Development (FP7) from the European Union.

== Awards and honours ==
Farooqi was elected a Fellow of the Royal Society in 2021.

Farooqi was elected a Fellow of the Academy of Medical Sciences (FMedSci) in 2013. Her citation on election reads:

Sadaf Farooqi has fundamentally altered our understanding of human obesity. Her work was key to the discovery of the first mutations that cause human obesity, defining and characterising a range of previously undescribed genetic obesity syndromes, and establishing that the principal driver of obesity in these monogenic syndromes was a failure of the central control of appetite and satiety. She has been greatly committed to the translation of her research into patient benefit and has helped to change clinical attitudes and diagnostic practice world-wide. Obesity is one of the major public health threats facing the international community and Farooqi's research has been critical in bringing real biological insights where these were previously lacking.

Farooqi was interviewed by Jim Al-Khalili on The Life Scientific, first broadcast on BBC Radio 4 in 2017.

Farooqi was awarded the American Diabetes Association's Outstanding Scientific Achievement Award in 2019.
