= Giles Yeo =

Scientist specialising in genetic control of body-weight

Giles Yeo MBE FMedSci
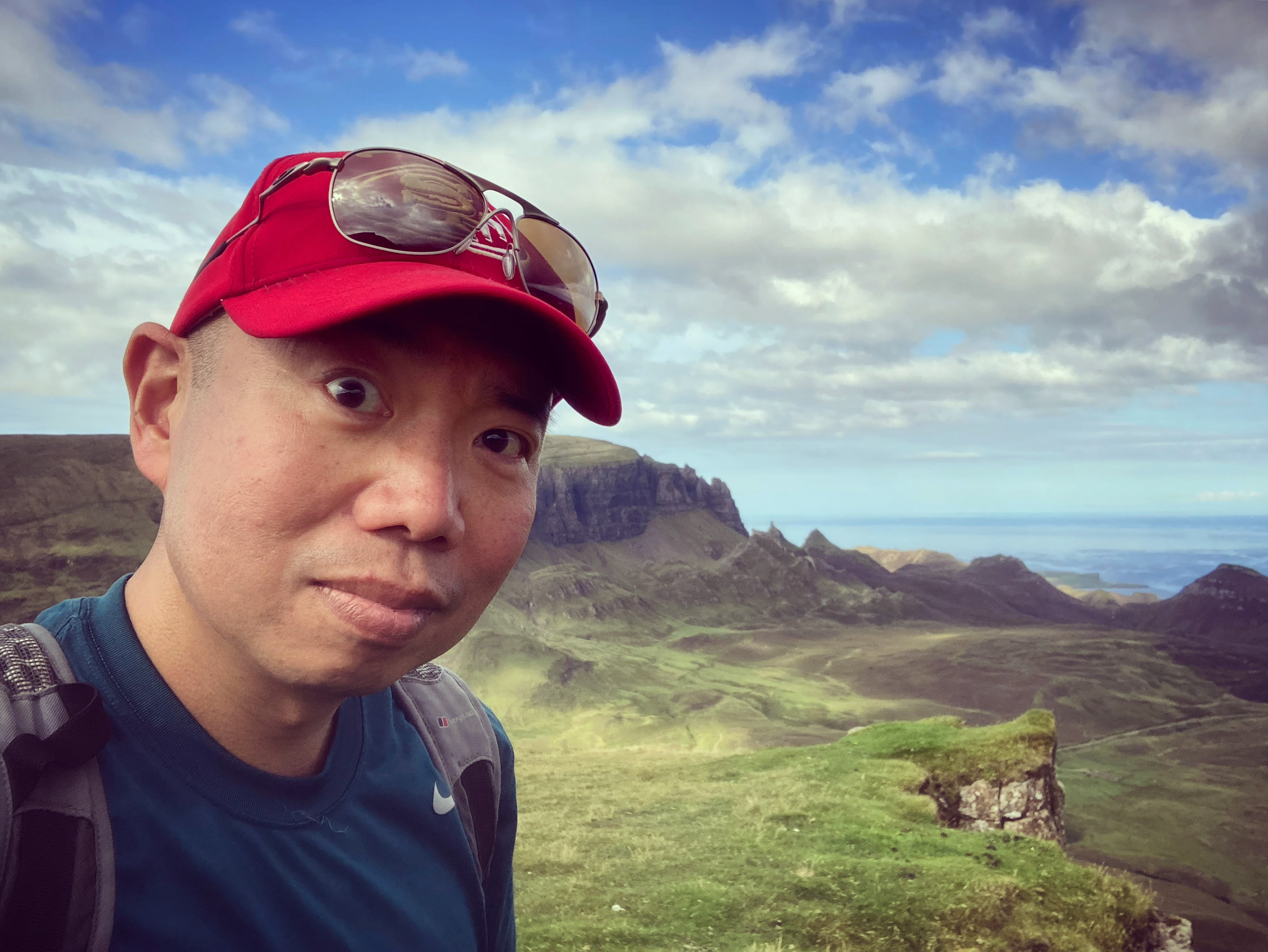
- Yeo in 2020 in Skye, Scotland
- Citizenship: United Kingdom; United States
- Education: University of California at Berkeley and University of Cambridge
- Occupations: Professor, author and broadcaster
- Years active: 1998–present
- Employer: University of Cambridge
- Title: Professor of Molecular Neuroendocrinology
- Awards: MBE

Giles Yeo MBE FMedSci is an American-British biologist. He is the professor of molecular neuroendocrinology at the Medical Research Council Metabolic Diseases Unit and scientific director of the Genomics/Transcriptomics Core at the University of Cambridge.

== Early life and education ==
Giles Yeo was born in London, England to Singaporean Chinese parents. He previously lived in Singapore, San Francisco, and since 1994 has been based in Cambridge, United Kingdom. In 1994 he graduated from University of California, Berkeley (Molecular and Cell Biology) and in 1997 he completed a PhD study at University of Cambridge (Molecular genetics). His focus is on the study of obesity, brain control of body weight, and genetic influences on appetitive behaviour.

== Career ==
=== Media ===
He has presented three BBC Horizon documentaries: Why Are We Getting So Fat? (2016), Clean Eating: The Dirty Truth (2017) and Vitamin Pills: Miracle or Myth? (2018). Giles was also a presenter on BBC Two's Trust Me, I'm A Doctor. His first book, Gene Eating: The Story Of Human Appetite was published in December 2018. His second book, Why Calories Don't Count, was published in June 2021. Giles also presented Plant Based Promises, a three-part BBC Radio 4 programme in June–July 2022. He hosts the podcast Dr Giles Yeo Chews The Fat. In February 2026, Giles presented The Hunger Game, a five-part BBC Radio 4 programme. Giles also now co-hosts a podcast with journalist Rose Stokes called A Matter of Fat.

=== Academic positions ===
Yeo has held the following posts at the University of Cambridge:

- from December 1998: Research Associate at Cambridge Institute for Medical Research
- from December 2007: Scientific Director of Genomics/Transcriptomics at Institute for Metabolic Science
- from September 2009: Graduate Tutor at Wolfson College, Cambridge
- from September 2014: Principal Research Associate at MRC Metabolic Diseases Unit
- from August 2022: Professor of Molecular Neuroendocrinology at MRC Metabolic Diseases Unit

== Honours and public appearances ==
In November 2019 Giles was the winner of the centenary year The Genetics Society JBS Haldane Lecture, which ‘recognises an individual for outstanding ability to communicate topical subjects in genetics research, widely interpreted, to an interested lay audience’. His Haldane Lecture was entitled 'Is Obesity A Choice', and was given at The Royal Institution in London on November 27, 2019. In October 2020 he was awarded an MBE in the Queen's 2020 Birthday Honours for services to 'Research, Communication and Engagement'. In January 2021 he was a guest on the BBC Radio 4 programme The Life Scientific. He was awarded The Society for Endocrinology medal in 2022. Yeo has been the honorary president of the British Dietetic Association since 2019. He was elected a Fellow of the Academy of Medical Sciences in 2026.

== See also ==
- Obesity
