= Nicholas Wareham =

British epidemiologist

Nicholas J. Wareham is a British epidemiologist who researches obesity, diabetes, and other metabolic disorders. He is director of the MRC Epidemiology Unit and co-director of the Institute of Metabolic Science at the University of Cambridge. He is also a Wellcome Trust Senior Fellow in Clinical Science at the University of Cambridge, the director of the University's Centre for Diet and Activity Research (CEDAR), and the co-leader of the University's Aetiology of Diabetes and Related Metabolic Disorders Programme. He was educated at St Thomas's Hospital Medical School and the London School of Hygiene and Tropical Medicine. Before joining the faculty at Cambridge, he worked at Harvard University. He was elected a Fellow of the Academy of Medical Sciences in 2019.
