= Addenbrooke's Hospital =

NHS teaching hospital and research centre in Cambridge, England

- Cambridge University Hospitals NHS Foundation Trust
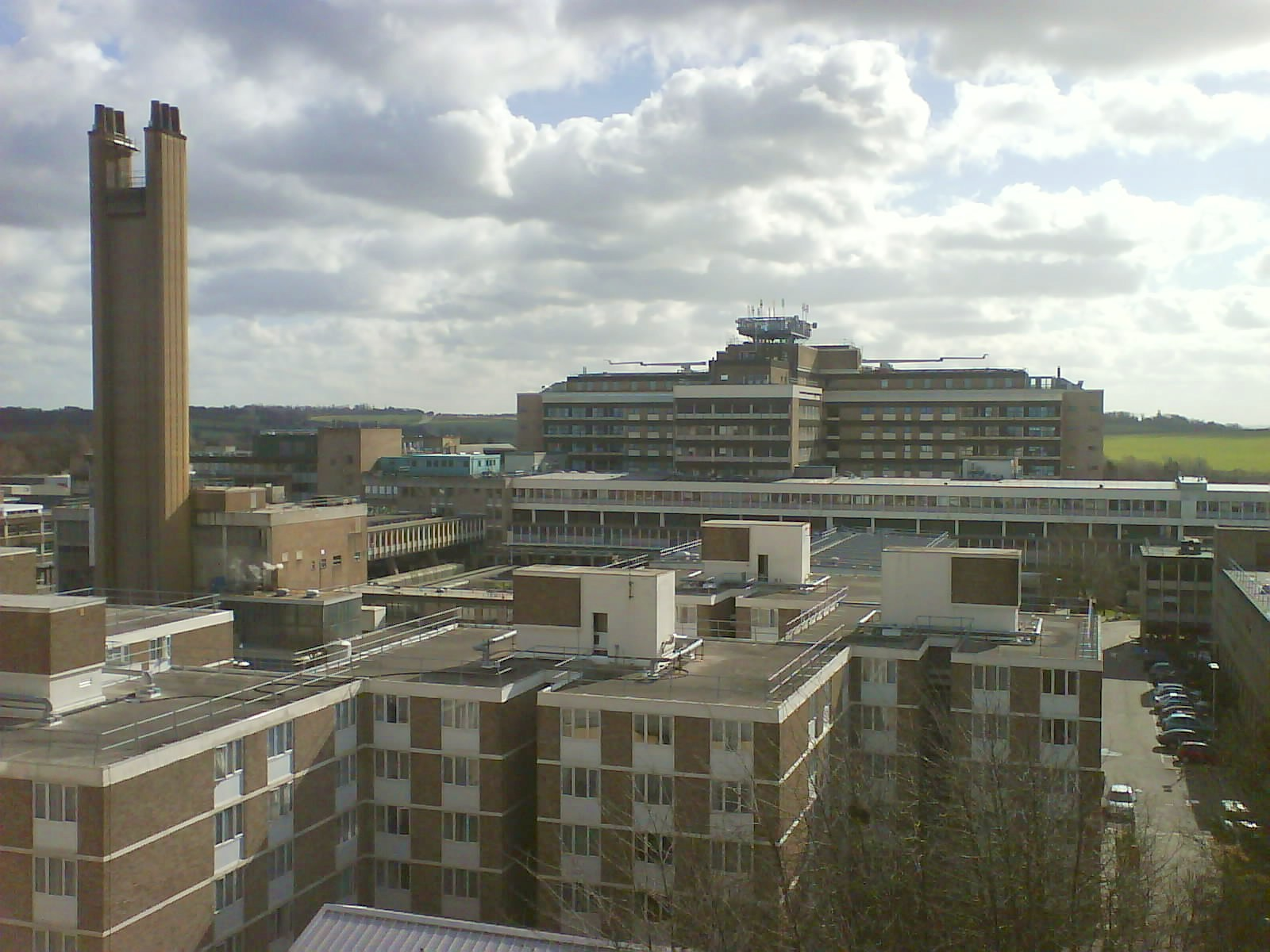
- Addenbrooke's Hospital

- Shown in Cambridgeshire

Geography
- Location: Cambridge Biomedical Campus, Cambridge, England
- Coordinates: 52.176°N 0.140°E

Organisation
- Care system: National Health Service
- Type: Teaching
- Affiliated university: University of Cambridge Medical School

Services
- Emergency department: Major Trauma Centre – (Adult & Children)
- Beds: 880 beds (Note: The trust has 1,000 beds, of which 120 are at the Rosie Hospital, leaving 880 at Addenbrooke's Hospital)

History
- Founded: 1766

Links
- Website: www.cuh.nhs.uk
- Lists: Hospitals in England

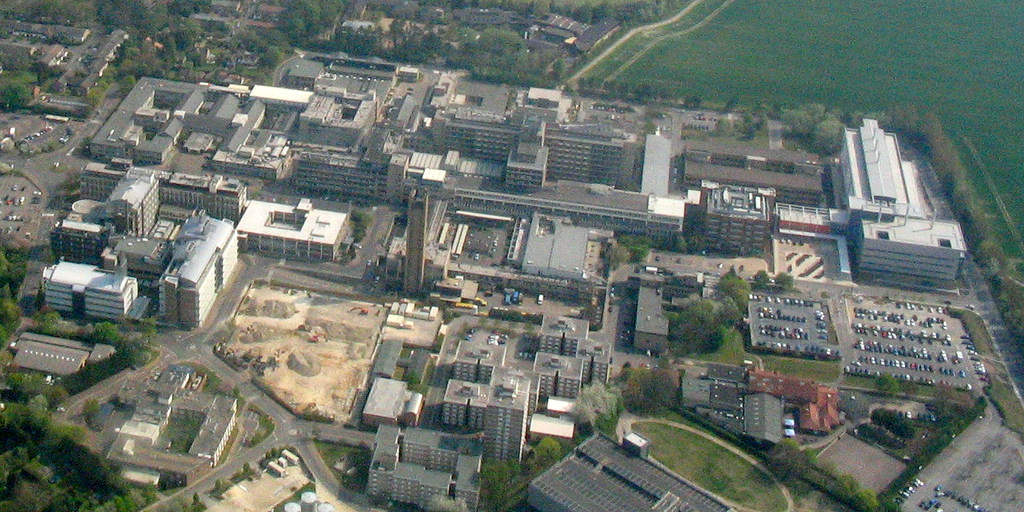
Aerial view of Addenbrooke's Hospital before 2010

Addenbrooke's Hospital is a large teaching hospital and research centre in Cambridge, England, with strong affiliations to the University of Cambridge. Addenbrooke's Hospital is located on the Cambridge Biomedical Campus. It is run by Cambridge University Hospitals NHS Foundation Trust and is a designated academic health science centre. It is also the East of England's major trauma centre and was the first such centre to be operational in the United Kingdom.

== History ==
Addenbrooke's Hospital Act 1767
- Act of Parliament
- Parliament of Great Britain
- Long title: An Act for establishing and well-governing a General Hospital, to be called Addenbrooke's Hospital, in the Town of Cambridge.
- Citation: 7 Geo. 3. c. 99
- Territorial extent: Great Britain

Dates
- Royal assent: 20 May 1767
- Commencement: 11 November 1766 (Note: Start of session.)
- Repealed: 31 January 2013
Other legislation
Repealed by	Statute Law (Repeals) Act 2013

Status: Repealed

Text of statute as originally enacted

The hospital was founded in 1766 on Trumpington Street with £4,500 from the will of Dr John Addenbrooke, a fellow of St Catharine's College. In 1962 the first building was opened on its present site, on the southern edge of the city at the end of Hills Road. The last patient left the Trumpington Street site in 1984 and the site was redeveloped in the 1990s – it is now occupied by the Cambridge Judge Business School (in the former main building), as well as Browns Brasserie & Bar (in the former adjacent outpatients building). A new elective care facility was procured under a Private Finance Initiative contract in 2004, It was built by Alfred McAlpine and designed by Llewelyn Davies Architects at a cost of £85 million and completed in spring 2007.

== Notable staff ==
- Margaret Morgan, (born 1864) matron, 1901–1904
- Alice Blomfield, (1866–1938) matron, 1905–1908

Both these matrons trained at The London Hospital under Eva Luckes, who adopted Florence Nightingale's belief that the new style of matron should be autonomous and solely responsible for their staff. However, as with the "Guy's Hospital dispute" these new style of matrons sometimes had issues with the acceptance of their autonomy. Morgan felt that she had an issue with the acceptance of her authority by some medical staff, and left after three years. Blomfield also experienced an unspecified problem between herself and the medical staff.

== Services ==
Addenbrooke's Hospital provides a full range of clinical services, with two exceptions: cardiothoracic surgery is performed at the adjacent Royal Papworth Hospital, which re-located to the Cambridge Biomedical Campus in 2019, and maternity services are provided at the adjacent Rosie Hospital, which has a midwife-led birth unit and birth pool.

The hospital is a designated major trauma centre. This was the first regional major trauma centre in England to become fully operational and was featured on the BBC documentary series 'Life Savers' in 2013.

Addenbrooke's Hospital is a tertiary referral centre for a number of specialities. It is one of the UK's seven liver transplant centres and performs multi-visceral transplants. It is a busy regional neurosurgical centre. It is also a centre of excellence for renal services, bone marrow transplantation, cleft lip and palate reconstruction, treatment of rare cancers, medical genetics, and paediatrics. The hospital is also the designated regional centre for pancreatic, biliary and liver cancer surgery and tertiary referral centre for complex pancreatitis. It has 37 operating theatres, and in addition to the neurosciences (neurosurgery and neurology) critical care unit it also has an adult, a paediatric, and a neonatal intensive care service, and several high-dependency areas (adult, paediatric, transplant, surgical, coronary care).

The hospital is renowned for its transplant centre. Its transplant surgeons have made many notable contributions.

The Cambridge Biomedical Campus has an on-site helipad, for the numerous air ambulances that visit – often transporting patients in a critical state to the major trauma centre at Addenbrooke's Hospital.

== Transport ==
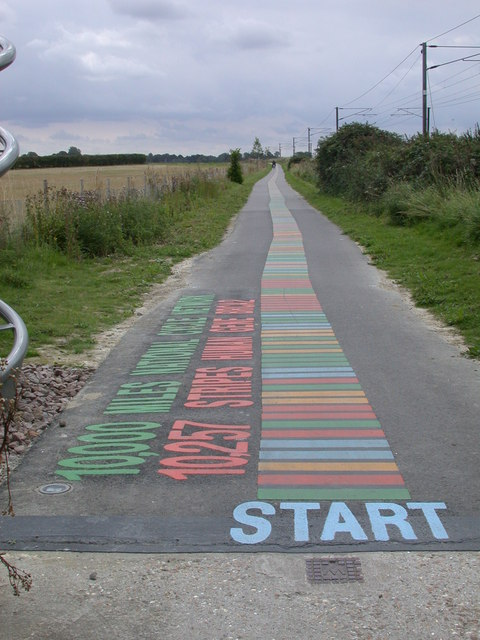
Start of DNA cycle path

=== Bus ===
The campus is served by a busy bus station, located on its gateway roundabout, with up to 60 buses arriving there every hour. Addenbrooke's Hospital is directly accessible from three of Cambridge's five Park and Ride sites, of which Babraham Road and Trumpington are nearest. The green Park and Ride buses from the Babraham Park and Ride stop at its main bus station, while the busway service A connects various locations around the site to Trumpington Park and Ride and the Cambridgeshire Guided Busway network. Busway service U from and to Eddington has a stop at the Madingley Road Park and Ride and one outside the hospital's outpatient entrance. All three services also stop at the Cambridge railway station.

=== Bicycle ===
Various cycleways lead to Addenbrooke's Hospital and a new cycleway and footpath linking Great Shelford and Addenbrooke's Hospital opened in August 2006, which also marks the 10,000th mile of the National Cycle Network.

=== Car ===
Parking is increasingly restricted, as former car parks are being built on, and staff, patients and visitors are encouraged to travel in by bus or bike. A new multi-storey car park with 1050 spaces for visitor and patient parking and a further 63 for disabled parking was opened on 18 April 2008. There is a customer service desk and concession tickets are available for outpatients with appointments.

Transport remains something of a problem due to the volume of people arriving each day. There are approximately 8,000 car movements each day, but only 3,200 car parking spaces available (as of March 2004). With three proposed developments around the hospital, including an extension of the hospital site itself and two residential developments, traffic is expected to increase considerably. For this reason, work for a new access road from Hauxton Road in Trumpington to Addenbrooke's Hospital began in July 2007. The £25million new road opened in October 2010 and provides direct access from the M11 to the Cambridge Biomedical Campus, home to the hospital. It is expected to handle up to 25,000 journeys per day when nearby residential developments are complete. The route was originally intended for access to the hospital only and as such, entrances to the Cambridge Biomedical Campus are fitted with Automatic Number Plate Recognition cameras to monitor traffic entering and leaving the site without stopping. The police have power to issue Fixed Penalty Notices to drivers who are not authorised to use the route.

=== Rail ===
The nearest railway station to the campus is Cambridge South, which was built to serve the Cambridge Biomedical Campus.

== Open days ==
The hospital holds a free open day to allow members of the public to visit areas of the hospital which would usually be inaccessible. The tours include visits to the basement service corridors, the hospital's mortuary, the pathology laboratories, the hospital roof, and one of the operating theatres. In March 2016, over 5,000 visitors attended the event.

== Fundraising ==
Addenbrooke's Charitable Trust (ACT) is the independent registered charity for Addenbrooke's Hospital and its associated hospitals. Its aim is to support and promote the work of Addenbrooke's Hospital for the benefit of patients and staff, by raising extra funds to enhance services, facilities and research.

== Incidents ==
In 2010 the hospital carried out CT scan on mummified child dating from the third century AD in the collection of Saffron Walden Museum.

In 2011 an Addenbrooke's Hospital doctor placed a “do not resuscitate” instruction on a patient's notes without consultation with either the patient or the family. The patient later died, and following a court case in 2014 Addenbrooke's Hospital was found to have acted unlawfully in denying the patient life saving treatment.

In 2012, Dr Narinder Kapur, consultant neuropsychologist and Head of the Neuropsychology Service won a case of unfair dismissal against Cambridge University Hospitals NHS Foundation Trust. Kapur raised patient-safety concerns, such as the use of unqualified staff in clinics, which were later vindicated by an internal report.

In 2015, an Addenbrooke's Hospital doctor was jailed for 22 years for abusing 18 boys at the hospital, between 2009 and 2013.

In April 2016, Addenbrooke's Hospital was criticised for the treatment of Prof. Sir David J.C. Mackay. Mackay was unable to sleep, being kept awake by noisy staff, excessive heating, lights, and loud machinery that exceeded World Health Organisation guidelines. Mackay was reported to be in tears, and died six days later.

In 2016, Joan Hawes, who had attended Addenbrooke's accident and emergency department with a suspected deep vein thrombosis, was reportedly discharged without investigations for deep vein thrombosis, pulmonary embolism or Venous thrombosis, and died overnight at home.

In April 2021, a United States Air Force CV22 Osprey helicopter damaged the hospital helipad as it took off. East Anglian Air Ambulance and Magpas were temporarily diverted to Cambridge City Airport while the site was cleared of debris.

In May 2023, a member of staff working as a consultant physician was reported to have inappropriately accessed medical records to obtain personal details relating to their former partner's new partner.

In December 2025, a fire erupted on the second floor of the hospital's Car Park 1, prompting more than 30 firefighters to respond. Inspections conducted soon after the fire revealed damage to the car park's structure.

== See also ==
- Healthcare in Cambridgeshire
- List of hospitals in England
