= Lancashire County Lunatic Asylum =

Lancashire County Lunatic Asylum and Lancashire County Asylum are historical names for:

- The first Lancashire County Lunatic Asylum, Lancaster Moor Hospital
- The second, Prestwich Hospital
- The third, Rainhill Hospital
- The fourth, Whittingham Hospital
- The fifth, Winwick Hospital, in Winwick, Cheshire (formerly Lancashire)
- The sixth, Calderstones Hospital near Whalley
