= North Cheshire and Mersey NHS Foundation Trust =

- Type: NHS foundation trust
- Established: 1 April 2026
- Headquarters: Warrington, Cheshire, England
- Region served: Halton; Warrington
- Hospitals: Halton General Hospital; Warrington Hospital
- Website: northcheshireandmersey.nhs.uk

North Cheshire and Mersey NHS Foundation Trust is an NHS foundation trust in North West England.

The trust was formed on 1 April 2026 following the merger of Bridgewater Community Healthcare NHS Foundation Trust and Warrington and Halton Teaching Hospitals NHS Foundation Trust.
