= Scott Clinic =

Psychiatric hospital in Merseyside, England

Scott Clinic was a medium secure psychiatric unit located on the outskirts of Rainhill, Merseyside, England. It originated from and operated on the site of the former Rainhill Hospital. The unit was named after the late Dr. Peter Scott and provided facilities for up to 50 patients across 5 wards. Ivy and Hawthorn were the male admission wards, with Myrtle being the male assertive rehabilitation/neurocognitive ward. Olive ward was pre-discharge and Poplar ward was the female ward.

In January 2015, Mersey Care NHS decided to close the unit permanently, after deeming it no longer fit for purpose.

== Notable patients ==
- Michael Abram - After stabbing former Beatles member George Harrison multiple times. Abram was released on 4 July 2002.
