= Centre points of the United Kingdom =

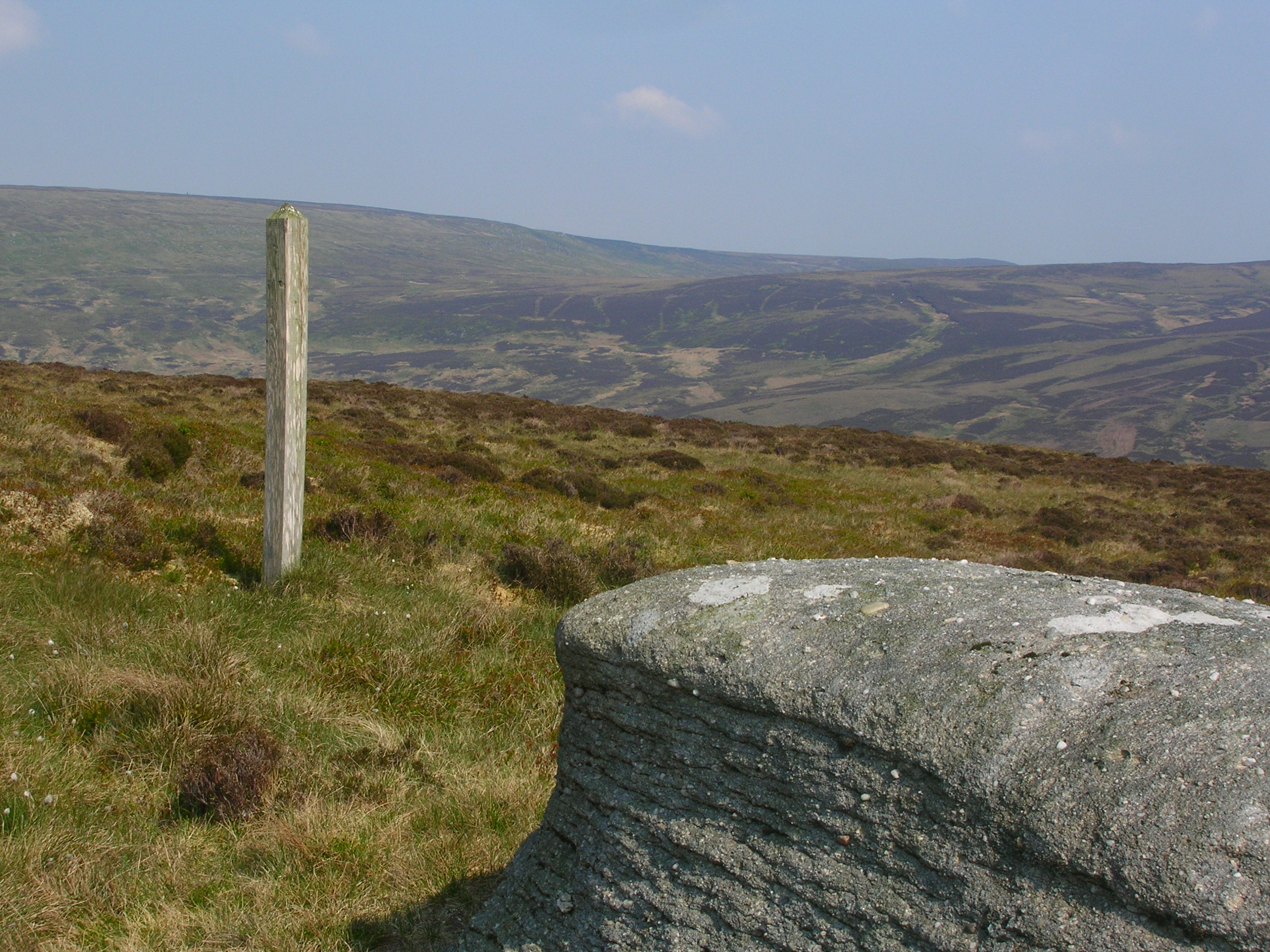
This stake is one of several way markers that mark the location of variously calculated geographic centres of Britain. It is located just to the west of Whitendale Hanging Stones in Lancashire at SD 64188 56541.

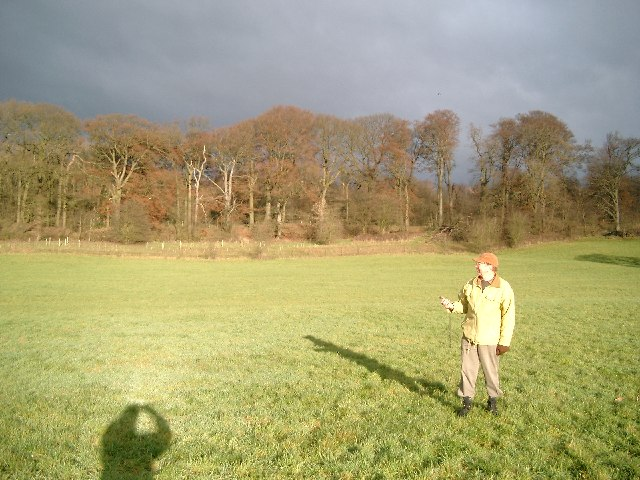
"Centrographers" at the centre of mainland Great Britain, in a field near Whalley, Lancashire at Grid Ref SD 72321.72 36671.1 (approximately), in December 2005

There has long been debate over the exact location of the geographical centre of the United Kingdom, and its constituent countries, due to the complexity and method of the calculation, such as whether to include offshore islands, and the fact that erosion will cause the position to change over time. There are two main methods of calculating this "centre": either as the centroid of the two-dimensional shape made by the country (projected to the Airy ellipsoid then flattened using the Transverse Mercator projection), or as the point farthest from the boundary of the country (either the sea, or, in the case of constituent countries, a land border). These two methods give quite different answers.

== Traditional locations ==
The town of Haltwhistle in Northumberland has banners stating that it is the "Centre of Britain". By another calculation the centre can also be said to be Dunsop Bridge, Lancashire, 71 miles (114 km) to the south.

However, in 2002 the Ordnance Survey conducted studies that pinpointed the respective centres more precisely, and it is their results that are quoted below.

== Centroid locations ==
Map of centres
1. Whitendale Hanging Stones
2. Morecambe Bay
3. Calderstones
4. Lindley Hall Farm
5. Annaghone
6. Near Blair Atholl
7. Banc Mawr
8. Church Flatts Farm
9. Near Hammerwich

The centroid is a mathematically derived point that is in every sense the centre of a two dimensional area like a piece of land. If a straight line is drawn through a centroid in any direction there will be equal length of the line on either side of the centroid as measured from it to the boundary if the line is unbroken on either side. If a line crosses an inlet of the sea then it can be considered as a stick of uniform weight with a material of negligible weight crossing the water, the line would then balance precisely at the centroid point if suspended.

Map of centres of the UK and Great Britain
Map of centres of UK and England by various methods

Put simply, the centroid is the point at which a cardboard cut-out of the area could be perfectly balanced on the tip of a pencil. Islands are assumed fixed to the mainland in their precise position by invisible rigid weightless wires. A mathematical method is used to do the balancing to a much greater accuracy than the practical method could achieve.

Unless stated, positions are the centroids of the two-dimensional shapes made by the countries. Calculations include offshore islands unless stated.

=== United Kingdom ===
- A position "in the middle of Morecambe Bay", approximately 1.5 miles (2.4 km) off the coast at Morecambe (#2), Lancashire, at Ordnance Survey grid reference SD4157566760.

=== Great Britain ===
- Whitendale Hanging Stones (#1 on the map), near Brennand Farm, outside Dunsop Bridge, Lancashire in the Forest of Bowland.(54°0′13.176″N 2°32′52.278″W; grid reference SD6418856541)

=== Great Britain (mainland only) ===
- A field south of Calderstones Partnership NHS Foundation Trust (#3), near Whalley, Lancashire (grid reference SD7232136671)

=== England ===
- Lindley Hall Farm (#4), Leicestershire (near Fenny Drayton and Higham on the Hill) (52°33′42.942″N 1°27′53.474″W; SP 36373.66 96143.05) A plaque denoting this point, and disputing the "traditional" centre of England as being at Meriden in the West Midlands, was erected by Ordnance Survey on 14 June 2013

=== Northern Ireland ===
- Annaghone (#5), near Cookstown, County Tyrone (54°36′27.277″N 6°41′35.323″W grid reference NV9706433729 ) Irish grid ref H 84494 74047.

=== Scotland ===
- Between Blair Atholl (#6) and Dalwhinnie, Perthshire (56°49′0.257″N 4°11′2.267″W; grid reference NN6678471599)

=== Wales ===
- Banc Mawr (#7), near Cwmystwyth, Ceredigion (52°19′48.791″N 3°45′59.072″W; grid reference SN7972871704)

== Locations found by other methods ==
Point farthest from the sea

- Church Flatts Farm (#8), Coton in the Elms, Derbyshire (52.72759°N 1.6252°W)

Point farthest from high tide mark (including tidal rivers)

- Between Hammerwich and Wall, south-west of Lichfield, Staffordshire (52.66°N 1.85°W;)

Mid point of the longest north–south axis

- Haltwhistle, Northumberland. The midpoint of the longest north–south meridian; also approximately the midpoint of each of the lines through it across Great Britain along the 16 main compass directions.

Centre of population

- This calculation depends on the method used (mean, median or geometric median; see Centre of population for details).

A calculation by Danny Dorling using the mean (least squares) method based on local authority district data from the 1990s gave the population centre of Great Britain at Appleby Parva, Leicestershire, 20 miles south of Derby. Since then, the population centre will have moved slightly south and east.

Centre of England

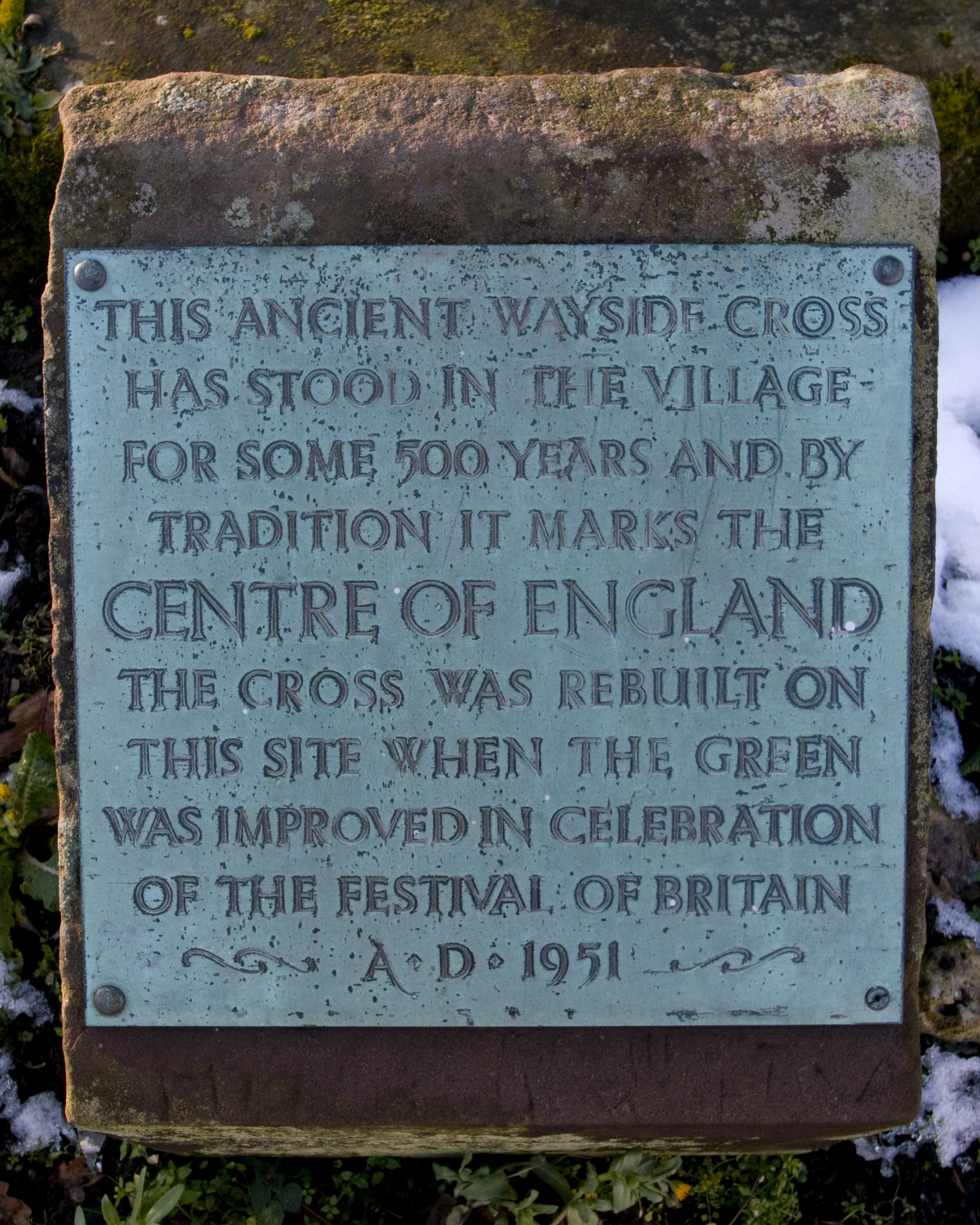
Plaque on the ancient cross at Meriden, West Midlands, the traditional centre of England

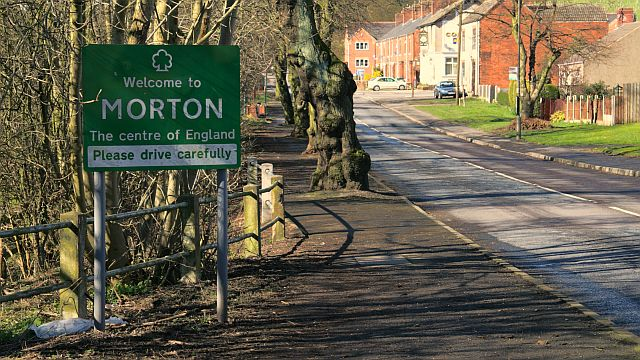
Road sign welcoming visitors to the Centre of England at Morton, Derbyshire

For centuries the parish of Meriden to the west of Coventry has claimed to be the geographical centre of England, and there has been a stone cross there commemorating the claim for at least 500 years. The justification is that the point farthest from the sea is in the parish. Morton, Derbyshire also claims to be the centre of England as it is not only midway along England's longest north-south axis, but also midway between the east coast and the Welsh border. Claims are also made for a tree, the Midland Oak, in Leamington Spa, Warwickshire, although the basis for these claims is not clear.

Valeriepieris Centre

- The Valeriepieris circle is the smallest circle containing half the population of some area. The centre of this circle is called the Valeriepieris Centre. The Valeriepieris Centre of Great Britain was found to be at latitude, longitude (51.8124,-1.1458), close to the town of Horton-cum-Studley in Oxfordshire..

== See also ==
- Centre of Scotland
- Extreme points of the United Kingdom
- Geography of the United Kingdom
- Geographical centre of Ireland
- Drainage divide
