= Shell Triple 10 =

The Shell Triple 10 is a working concept car developed by Shell to promote its charging network and lubricants. It was unveiled in June 2026 in the UK and there is no intent to manufacturer the concept and is intended to remain a one-off.

The name Triple 10 is a result of the design brief: to have a sub 10-minute charge time with 10-km/kWh economy and a life cycle 10-tonne CO2e footprint.

== Technical ==
The Triple 10 was engineered with external partners RML for the 32.5kWh usable battery pack architecture and high-performance integration; Empel Systems developed the electric motor and drive units with single-circuit cooling architecture; and Horiba Mira undertook vehicle integration, testing and validation.
