= District nurse =

Medical role responsible for managing care within the community

A district nurse manages care within a community and leads teams of community nurses and support workers. Duties generally include visiting house-bound patients and providing advice and care such as palliative care, wound management, catheter and continence care and medication support. Their work involves both follow-up care for recently discharged hospital inpatients and longer-term care for chronically ill patients who may be referred by many other services, as well as working collaboratively with general practitioners in preventing unnecessary or avoidable hospital admissions.

In the United Kingdom, the role requires registered nurses to take a specialist practitioner course that is approved by the Nursing and Midwifery Council (NMC).

== History ==
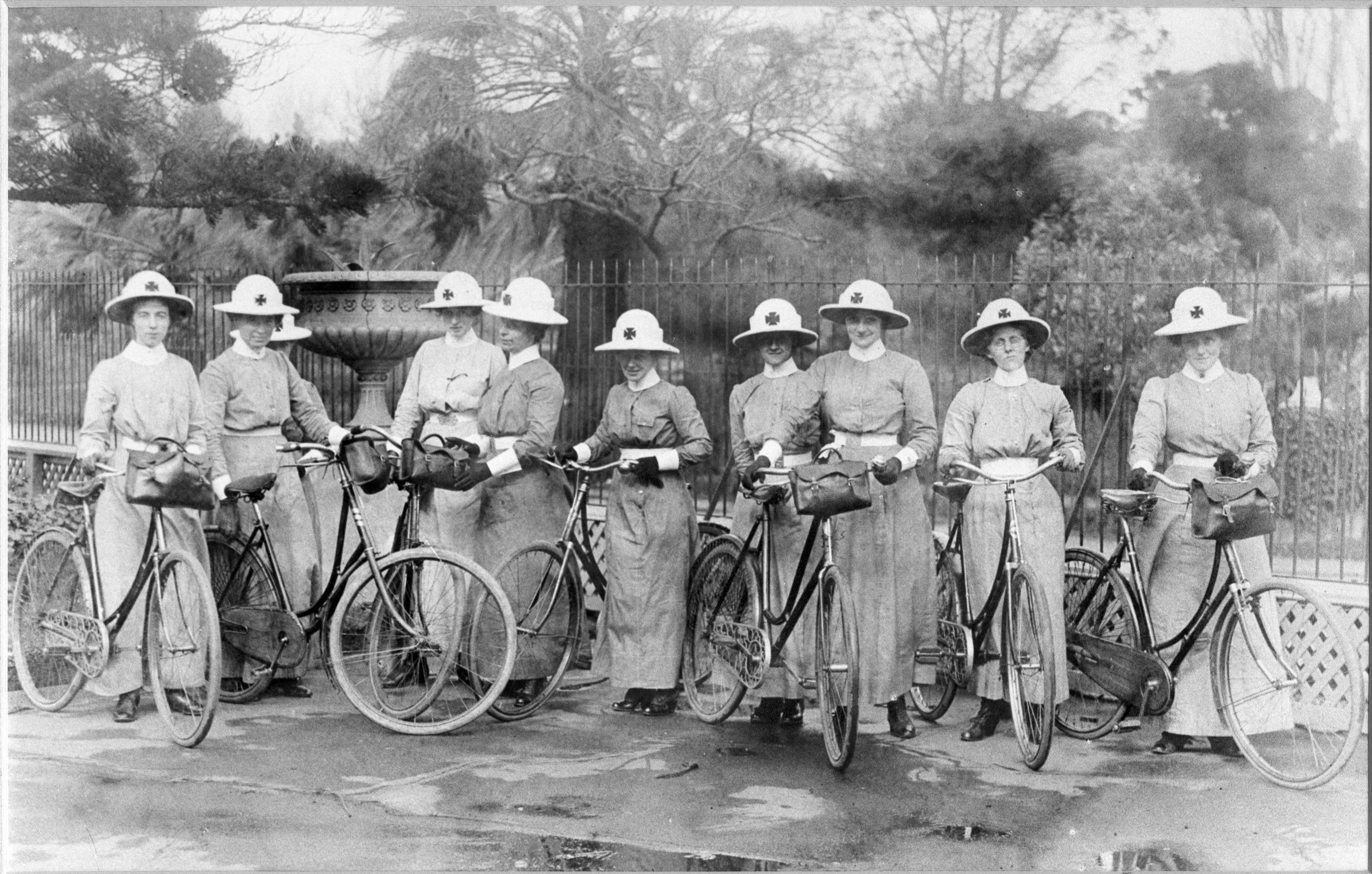
District nurses in Melbourne, 1904.

Organised district nursing is considered to have begun in England in 1859. In 1858 Liverpool philanthropist William Rathbone employed a nurse, Mary Robinson, to take care of his wife at home during her final illness. After his wife's death in 1859, he engaged Mary to go into one of the poorest districts of the city to bring healthcare to people who had no means to pay for it. He spent the rest of his life working to build up the service, with assistance from Florence Nightingale and others. District nursing on the Liverpool model soon sprang up in other towns, cities and rural areas, funded by local philanthropists.

In 1887 Queen Victoria’s Jubilee Institute for Nurses was founded, centralising training for district nurses (or Queen's Nurses as they became known) until nursing education became nationalised in 1968. The charity, which became the Queen's Nursing Institute, continues to support community nurses to this day. The Institute always needed to raise funds and until the creation of the NHS in 1948, district nurses collected contributions from their patients.

== Scope of practice ==
District nurses assess people to see how to provide nursing care that allows people to remain in their own homes, maintain their independence, or have additional support after discharge from hospital. A district nurse will manage a team of nurses that may provide wound care, train carers to administer eye drops if individuals can not do it themselves, support catheter care, and administer complex medication within a patient's home as well as immunisations. As well as treatment, a district nurse can offer advice and support with health concerns and refer to other organisations. District Nurses can specialise in different areas such as palliative care.

== United Kingdom ==
In the UK, training as a district nurse requires registration as a nurse in the adult branch, and consolidation of pre registration nurse education. A degree or postgraduate diploma course is then undertaken which is approved by the NMC. District nurses who hold additional qualifications may prescribe certain medications to patients as Community Practitioner Nurse Prescribers under the Nurse Prescribers' Formulary for Community Practitioners (Part XVIIB(i) of the Drug Tariff). They may be trained to assess patient's needs for equipment provision such as mobility and independent living aids, medical equipment such as specialist beds and mattresses, as well as guidance in applying for grants and welfare benefits.

In England, district nurses were previously employed by primary care trusts and are now mostly employed by hospital or community health trusts, whereas in Wales and Scotland, they are employed by the health board and may be based at centralised health centres or general practices. District nurses, like all qualified nurses, are regulated by the NMC.

The Queen's Nursing Institute produced a report in 2019 which showed that 22% of respondents to their survey worked a day or more of unpaid overtime each week. 90% regularly did unpaid overtime. District nurses, a job which requires experience, are generally older than hospital nurses and 46% planned to either retire or leave in the next six years. A majority reported that they had insufficient time to devote proper care to patients and 75% said they had vacancies or ‘frozen posts’ in their teams.

== New Zealand ==
In New Zealand, district nurses are usually employed by the district health boards, although there are some who come under private institutions. District Nursing in New Zealand work under the primary integrated care model, and can be classified as secondary care in some DHBs. Like their UK counterparts, New Zealand district nurses have a wide range of specialized clinical skills applicable to the community setting, which is why district nurse positions usually require some degree of previous clinical experience. There is also a strong focus on health issues affecting specific population groups (i.e. Rheumatic Fever prophylaxis). Veteran district nurses in New Zealand have had access to a higher pay scale compared to registered nurses in an acute setting.

== Australia ==
Australian district nursing is currently undergoing pressure as a result of large changes in funding. Previously, community nursing was predominantly government-funded via block funding, having grown from volunteer or charitable organisations. The introduction of the National Disability Insurance Scheme and the new aged care system means funding is being made accessible to clients who can then decide how to spend it. This has forced a greater level of competition on to the industry. This has led to many previously large district nursing organisations, such as the Royal District Nursing Service, amalgamating with residential care providers to attempt to build a vertically integrated model.

== See also ==
- The District Nurse TV programme
- Call the Midwife, TV programme
- Nurse on Wheels, 1963 film
- Visiting Nurse Association
- Home health nursing
