= Billinge Hospital =

- 5 Boroughs Partnership NHS Trust
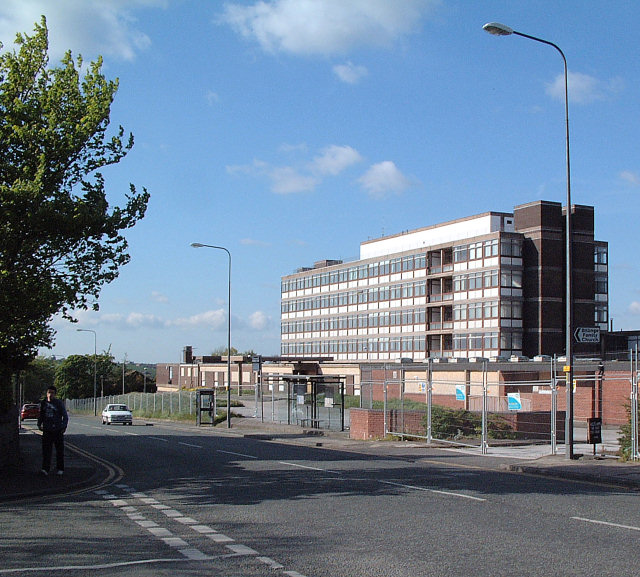
- Billinge Hospital

- Shown in Greater Manchester

Geography
- Location: Billinge Higher End, Greater Manchester, England, United Kingdom
- Coordinates: 53°31′11″N 2°42′45″W

Organisation
- Care system: Public NHS

Services
- Emergency department: No Accident & Emergency

History
- Founded: 1837
- Closed: 2004

Links
- Website: www.nwbh.nhs.uk
- Lists: Hospitals in England

Billinge Hospital was a National Health Service facility in the Billinge Higher End district of the Metropolitan Borough of Wigan, Greater Manchester, England. It was managed by the 5 Boroughs Partnership NHS Trust.

== History ==
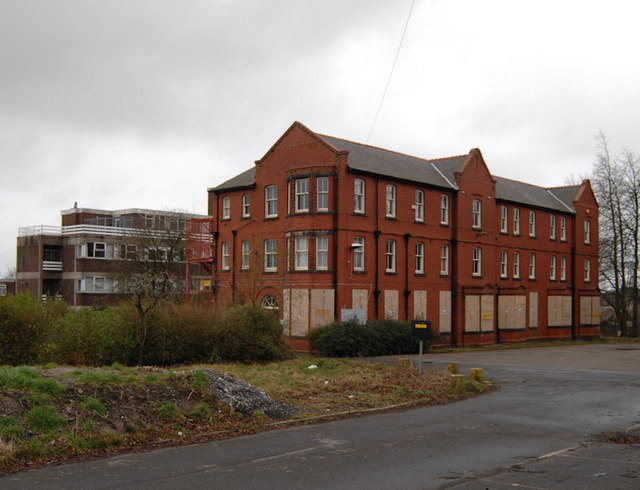
One of the last buildings from the original hospital (births were registered in this building)

The hospital had its origins in the Wigan Poor Law Union Workhouse established in 1837. This became the Frog Lane Public Assistance Institution in 1930. After it joined the National Health Service in 1948, it became the Frog Lane Welfare Home and started specialising in the care of the elderly. It became known as the Frog Lane Hospital before closing in 1970.

Opened in 1968, Billinge Maternity Hospital was established on the site and served as the maternity facility for the surrounding areas. In 2002 a group of women had their experiences of giving birth shown on Sky's Discovery Channel. After services had been transferred to other facilities in the area, the maternity hospital closed in June 2004 and the buildings were demolished in 2016. The site was subsequently developed for housing.

== See also ==
- List of hospitals in England
