= Capsticks =

British law firm

- Headquarters: London, United Kingdom
- No. of offices: 5
- Major practice areas: Health, housing, social care
- Key people: Victoria Watson (Managing Partner)
- Revenue: £37.5 million (2017)
- Date founded: 1979; 47 years ago
- Founder: Brian Capstick
- Company type: Limited liability partnership
- Website: www.capsticks.com

Capsticks is a British law firm founded by Brian Capstick based in South London. It specialises in health, housing and social care work.

It provides legal advice to General Practices. It has been suggested that conflicts of interest may cause problems because of its multiple roles in the National Health Service (NHS).

It is a member of the North of England Commercial Procurement Collaborative.

== History ==
The law firm was founded in 1979 by Brian Capstick in Putney, Southwest London. By 1990 the firms headcount had reached 62.

in 2013, five partners from DAC Beachcroft's office in Leeds moved to the firm.

It has been involved in the investigation of various scandals in the NHS, such as that into failings at Liverpool Community Health NHS Trust and into problems in GP practices.

It runs a Risk Barometer with the Health Service Journal.

In 2017, it was expected to secure an exclusive contract for prosecution work with the Solicitors Regulation Authority. It is on the Crown Commercial Service panel for general legal advice services.

In 2018, it acquired Whitehead Solicitors and expands its footprint in the North of England.

It is the legal adviser to NHS Employers.

In May 2022 it wrote off training course loans to trainees and handed out pay increases after profits increased from £8.5 million to £10 million during the pandemic.
