= MIRA Ltd. =

UK automotive engineering and development company

Coordinates: 52°33′12″N 1°27′51″W

HORIBA MIRA Ltd.
- Formation: 1946
- Legal status: Private Limited Company
- Purpose: Providing engineering services to global automotive and transport industries
- Location: Higham on the Hill, Leicestershire, United Kingdom
- Region served: Worldwide
- Parent organization: Horiba
- Website: www.horiba-mira.com

HORIBA MIRA Ltd. (formerly the Motor Industry Research Association) is an automotive engineering and development consultancy company headquartered near Nuneaton, Warwickshire, United Kingdom. It provides product engineering, research, testing, information and certification services to the automotive sector. Its headquarters are in the MIRA Technology Park Enterprise Zone. On 14 July 2015 MIRA announced that it was being bought by the Japanese-owned testing equipment group Horiba.

== History ==
=== Origins ===
MIRA was formed in 1946 and was mostly government-funded. It is based just off the A5 near the junction with the A444 near Nuneaton, Warwickshire, where over six hundred staff work, with another establishment in Basildon in Essex. The company dates back to the foundation of the Cycle Engineers' Institute (CEI) in 1898, which became the Incorporated Institution of Automobile Engineers (IAE) in 1906. The IAE became the Automotive Branch of the IMechE in 1946. The IAE and the Society of Motor Manufacturers and Traders were largely responsible for creating MIRA.

=== Pooling of expertise ===
After World War Two, the UK car industry was finding it difficult to export to countries where it formerly had little trouble finding markets for its wide range of cars. It was decided by the government to pool the research resources of UK car manufacturers into one site to reduce costs and possibly find new technological advances sooner that could be incorporated into all ranges of UK vehicle makes. The principal auto-makers were located in the Birmingham area, apart from Vauxhall which had its factory in Luton and Ford which by now was located at Dagenham to the east of London. The Motor Industry Research institution under its director Dr Albert Fogg (who would later become Engineering Chief at British Leyland) therefore looked for a location that was reasonably accessible from all these locations, and the site near Nuneaton fulfilled that criterion. The facilities became available to MIRA member companies in October 1948, though at this stage the test tracks consisted only of disused runways. They were finally opened on 28 April 1949 by Sir Leonard Lord who used explosives to cut the ceremonial tape. Facilities were nevertheless developed under Dr Fogg and Professor Robert Macmillan who took over the directorship from Fogg in 1964. Such examples include the half mile Belgian Pavé road used in vehicle tests, completed in 1950.

=== Secondary safety ===
Marking the increasing concern with secondary safety at the time was the opening by the Minister of Technology Tony Benn, in April 1968, of MIRA's indoor rig for crash-testing cars in head-on impacts. Such tests, at 30 mph (48 km/h), had recently become mandatory for cars sold in the US. The MIRA crash rig featured the UK's largest industrial linear induction motor. It was based on a design by Professor Eric Laithwaite of Imperial College. It replaced a complicated outdoor system that had involved the "victim" car's final seconds being controlled by means of a radar-operated remote device from a following vehicle.

=== Commercial organisation ===
Since 1975, the funding arrangements for belonging to the organisation went from a membership subscription (or levy – mostly irrespective of the quantity of work that took place for individual manufacturers) for car companies to a fee-based system. Currently, the site has around £110 million of test equipment. On 4 July 2001, the organisation changed its name to MIRA Ltd. At this point, it also became liable for corporation tax. It bought the Creative Automotive Design consultancy in March 2003. The company's turnover has increased 4.9% to £45.7m in 2013, producing a £6m surplus which was all reinvested back into itself. On 14 July 2015 MIRA announced that it was being bought by the Japanese-owned testing equipment group HORIBA and changed its name to HORIBA MIRA Ltd.

== Technology park ==
HORIBA MIRA is headquartered within the MIRA Technology Park, a park for automotive research and development. In 2011 the UK government announced that the 850-acre park would become an enterprise zone. Companies who have moved into the park include Haldex and Aston Martin. In February 2015 the government announced that the enterprise zone would be expanded.

== Former airfield ==
The proving ground which forms the largest area of HORIBA MIRA is built on 760 acres (310 ha) of the former RAF Lindley airfield, named after the nearby Lindley Hall Farm after the former Lindley Hall. This farm claims to be the centre of England, if calculated by the centre of mass method, similar to a centroid. Meriden also makes a similar claim. The Ashby and Nuneaton Joint Railway used to pass along the south-east perimeter of HORIBA MIRA, and is now the Weddington Country Walk. The line was open to freight until 1971, and had a station at Higham on the Hill on the perimeter of HORIBA MIRA.

== Operations ==
HORIBA MIRA is a provider of product engineering, research, testing, development and certification to the worldwide transport industry. Its work includes crash testing, aerodynamic design and vehicle ergonomics. It was developed to provide research for UK companies but now provides engineering consultancy to clients worldwide.
