= Calderstones Partnership NHS Foundation Trust =

UK NHS foundation trust

- Type: NHS hospital trust
- Headquarters: Whalley, Lancashire
- Chair: Rupert Nichols
- Chief executive: Mark Hindle
- Website: www.calderstones.nhs.uk

Calderstones Partnership NHS Foundation Trust based in Whalley, Lancashire, England, was a provider of services for people with a Learning Disability or other developmental disorders in the North West of England. It became a Foundation Trust in 2009.

== History ==
It provided an on-site assessment and treatment facility with hospital based care in Whalley and a community service that included more than 40 houses across the North West. Some of the land formerly used by the institution has been sold off for housing.

In 2001 the Trust cared for 375 people, 211 at Calderstones, and 164 in the community. 85 people were admitted through the courts.

Calderstones was once the centre of Lancashire's institutional care, with 3 hospitals, Brockhall Certified Institution, Langho Epileptic Colony and Calderstones Certified Institution in close proximity.

Calderstones Hospital was managed by Burnley District Health Authority from 1974 to 1982 when it passed to Lancashire Area Health Authority.

In June 2015 it was reported to be considering a merger with Mersey Care NHS Trust. It currently has a turnover of £42 million per year, and it will be reducing the number of beds from 215 to 182.

It was named by the Health Service Journal as one of the top hundred NHS trusts to work for in 2015. At that time it had 1396 full-time equivalent staff and a sickness absence rate of 6.1%. 61% of staff recommend it as a place for treatment and 62% recommended it as a place to work.

In October 2015 it was announced that the hospital would be closed and the Trust abolished by July 2016. Merseycare is to take over the remains of the organisation.

== See also ==
- List of NHS trusts
