= Brennand Farm =

British geographical location

Coordinates: 54.003644°N 2.547859°W

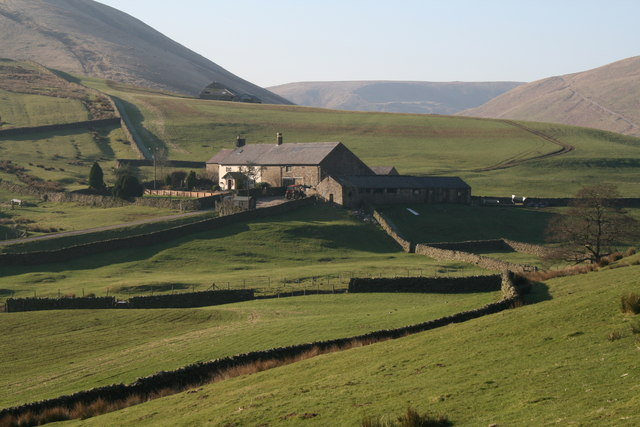
Brennand Farm, Bowland

Brennand Farm is often claimed to be the true centre of Great Britain.

The centre, as calculated by Ordnance Survey as the centroid of the two-dimensional shape of Great Britain, including all its islands, is at Whitendale Hanging Stones, about 1 mile (2 km) north of the farm and about 4 1/2 miles (7 km) north-west of the village of Dunsop Bridge - which has the nearest BT phone box to the 'true centre'. A plaque reads "You are calling from the BT payphone that marks the centre of Great Britain".

Haltwhistle claims to be the centre by a different method.
