= Catherine Arnott =

British medical doctor and suffragette (1858–1942)

- Born: 6 September 1858; Mhow, Madhya Pradesh, British India
- Died: 23 October 1942 (aged 84); Skipton, North Yorkshire, England
- Burial place: Ecclefechan, Dumfriesshire, Scotland
- Education: London University's School of Medicine for Women
- Occupations: Medical doctor and suffragette
- Employers: Lancaster County Lunatic Asylum, England; Lady Dufferin Hospital, Karachi, India; Jaswant Hospital for Women, Jodhpur, India
- Organization: Women's Social and Political Union

Catherine Arnott (6 September 1858 – 23 October 1942) was a British medical doctor and suffragette. She worked as a hospital medical officer in both England and India and later became an expert on the treatment of tuberculosis.

== Early life ==
Arnott was born on 6 September 1858 at Mhow, Madhya Pradesh, British India, where her father was a surgeon. Her parents were Dr. Francis Shortt Arnott and Ann Arnott (née Gabourel).

== Medical career ==
Arnott was educated at London University's School of Medicine for Women, but, as this institution was not permitted to award degrees to women, in 1893 she sat her exams through the Royal University of Ireland. In 1894, she was appointed assistant Medical Officer at the Lancaster County Lunatic Asylum, Lancashire. By the following year she had been promoted to resident Medical Officer.

In 1896, she returned to British India. She was firstly employed at Mure Memorial Hospital, then became the medical officer at the Lady Dufferin Hospital, Karachi. Between 1901 and 1904 she was in charge of the Jaswant Hospital for Women, Jodhpur.

Later in her career, she returned to England and worked treating infectious diseases in London and as a doctor in Coventry. She then settled in West Yorkshire to run the Eastby Sanatorium in Bradford as its Chief Medical Officer, staying to run it for many years. She became known as an expert in treating tuberculosis.

== Activism ==
Arnott was a suffragette. In 1913, she served as the Press and Honorary Secretary of the Women's Social and Political Union (WSPU)'s branch in Coventry. She delivered speeches at the market square, arguing that "women did not want the vote for the pleasure and excitement of going to the polling booth once every five years; they wanted it to ameliorate the conditions of men, women and children." She left Coventry's WSPU when she moved to Eastby. Arnott's sister Harriet Collington née Arnott was also active in the women's enfranchisement campaign.

== Death ==
Arnott died in Skipton on 23 October 1942 and was buried in Ecclefechan, Dumfriesshire, Scotland.
