= Liverpool Community Health NHS Trust =

Liverpool Community Health NHS Trust was one of the community health trusts created in 2012 under the Transforming Community Services programme.

It provided controversial services for people at the end of their life, Liverpool Care Pathway later nationally discredited and withdrawn.

Care was organised across 18 neighbourhood teams in the city.

Bernie Cuthel the chief executive resigned after the Care Quality Commission (CQC) issued the trust with two warnings in January 2014 for failing to meet national targets. Staff at Fazakerley hospital had raised concerns over "bullying" managers and a "blame culture" that made them afraid to report incidents. She obtained a post in Manchester Mental Health and Social Care Trust advising on change of culture necessary to reduce bullying. Banned from holding post in NHS England she held an interim board role in Betsi Cadwaladr University Health Board in Wales.

An inspection by the Care Quality Commission on 31 October and 1 November 2014 of services provided at HM Prison Liverpool was highly critical, recording poor practice as a result of staff shortages and poor handling of medication. The Trust withdrew from the provision of services at the prison.

In February 2015 the Trust announced that it had abandoned attempts to become a foundation trust.

In March 2016 a report by Capsticks Solicitors was published criticising the trust's historical culture which was seen as "oppressive" with staff "driven to the brink." It found that from 2010 to 2014 "Inappropriate and unsafe care was not addressed, even where that was clearly set out in internal or external reports, and the response to adverse incidents was grossly deficient, with a failure to investigate properly and learn lessons." Standards of governance during the same period were compared to those in Mid-Staffordshire, and for similar reasons. The organisation was said to have pursued aggressive savings as part of its drive for foundation trust status.

A failure to exercise appropriate clinical-control led to the suspension of chief nurse and executive officer Helen Lockett by the Nursing and Midwifery council April 2016.

The Trust entered a dispersal process under NHS England instruction. South Sefton CCG awarded their contract to Mersey Care NHS Foundation Trust. Bridgewater Community Healthcare NHS Foundation Trust was to take over the trust's contract in the Liverpool City Council boundaries. This was abandoned in March 2017 by Liverpool Clinical Commissioning Group after concerns over the due diligence process overseen by NHS Improvement arose.

Services in Sefton Metropolitan Borough were acquired by Mersey Care NHS Trust transferring April 2017 and Liverpool Services from November 2017. The trust ceased to exist in April 2018.

== See also ==
- Healthcare in Liverpool
- List of NHS trusts
