= Higham on the Hill =

Village in Leicestershire, England

Coordinates: 52.55569°N 1.43569°W

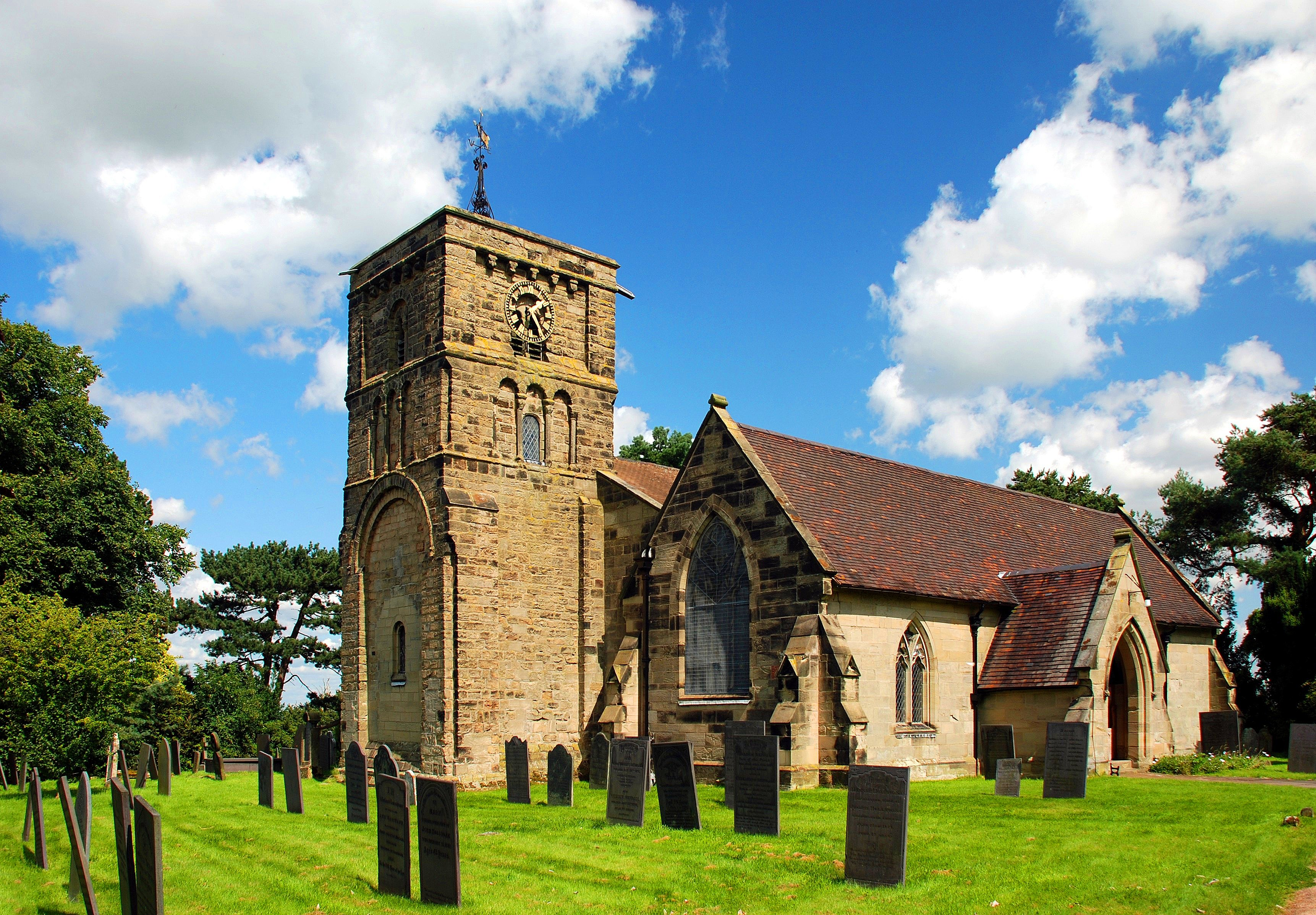
- Parish church of Saint Peter

- Location within Leicestershire
- Population: 840 (2011 census)
- OS grid reference: SP383954
- District: Hinckley and Bosworth
- Shire county: Leicestershire
- Region: East Midlands
- Country: England
- Sovereign state: United Kingdom
- Post town: NUNEATON
- Postcode district: CV13
- Dialling code: 01455
- Police: Leicestershire
- Fire: Leicestershire
- Ambulance: East Midlands
- UK Parliament: Hinckley and Bosworth

Higham on the Hill is a village and civil parish in the Hinckley and Bosworth district of Leicestershire, England. The population at the 2011 census was 840.

The village's name means 'homestead/village which is high'.

== Geography ==
The village is about three miles away from both Hinckley and Nuneaton. The parish (and the boundary between the East and West Midlands) is bounded by Warwickshire and the A5 to the south-west.

The parish includes the deserted village of Lindley that was mentioned in the Domesday Book and gave its name to RAF Lindley the site of which was acquired by the automotive research institute MIRA Ltd for its proving ground opened on 22 May 1954.

The Ashby Canal passes through the east of the parish, and the parish boundary runs along it near Stoke Golding.

The Ashby and Nuneaton Joint Railway used to pass through the parish, with its own dedicated railway station, which has since been demolished, Higham-on-the-Hill railway station.

=== Geographical centre of England ===
Lindley Hall Farm, the geographical centre of England as defined by the Ordnance Survey, lies within the parish at latitude 52°33'N, longitude 01°27'W, just north of Watling Street.

== Amenities ==
The village is home to St Peter's Church, a Grade II* listed parish church dedicated to St Peter.

Historically, Higham on the Hill had three pubs: The Barley Sheaf Inn, which was demolished to make way for houses on the land, The Fox Inn, which has since been converted into a house, and The Oddfellows Arms, which closed down in August 2018.

The village had a corner shop, Sehmbi Stores, which closed in 2021 after the owner passed away from COVID-19. A funeral was held, where many residents of Higham on the Hill and the nearby village of Stoke Golding lined the streets to remember him.

In the village, there is the Higham on the Hill Church of England primary school, which has received the rating of "Good" by Ofsted in their 2020 inspection.

== Notable residents ==
- Robert Burton, author of The Anatomy of Melancholy, was born in Lindley
- Geoffrey Fisher, Lord Archbishop of Canterbury from 1944 to 1961, born in 1887 and lived in the rectory
- Graeme Hawley (born 1975), who plays John Stape in Coronation Street, grew up in the village
