= NHS treatments blacklist =

List of drugs and procedures prohibited from NHS funding

In the public health system of the United Kingdom, the NHS treatments blacklist is an informal name for a list of medications and medical procedures not to be funded by public money except in exceptional cases, such as ones determined by the National Institute for Health and Care Excellence (NICE) to be of limited effectiveness, and particular brand name medicines. In 2017 there was a proposal for 3,200 over-the-counter (OTC) drugs to be restricted and 18 procedures to be added to the list. This generated some controversy amongst doctors with some arguing that OTC should be blacklisted instead, and others believing the move did not take into account individual patient needs.

== Procedures of limited clinical effectiveness ==
The NHS has produced lists of procedures of limited clinical effectiveness for many years, advising that they should not be carried out except in exceptional cases. Since the establishment of NICE in 1999 there has been a move to more robust processes, but such decisions always generate controversy. These lists were decided by clinical commissioning groups in England, but rules differ in Wales, Scotland and Northern Ireland. Restrictions on one kind of treatment for a condition may lead to patients getting different, and possibly more expensive treatment. Treatments for back pain, tonsillectomy, in vitro fertilisation, varicose veins commonly appear on these lists.

=== Surgery ===
Research by the Medical Technology Group reported in 2019 showed that many clinical commissioning groups were restricting access to basic elective surgeries and treatments in various ways, including imposing body mass index thresholds for hip and knee replacements, or visual acuity limits for cataract surgery.

In April 2019 NHS England issued guidance to NHS Trusts on the basis that the evidence shows that in most cases the benefits of these procedures did not justify the risk and opportunity cost involved.

Four procedures in Category 1 are only available in "exceptional circumstances":

- surgery for snoring (where there is no obstructive sleep apnea)
- dilation and curettage for heavy menstrual bleeding
- knee arthroscopy with osteoarthritis
- injection for nonspecific low back pain (where no sciatica)

For 13 procedures in Category 2 patients must "meet agreed criteria":

- Breast reduction
- Removal of benign skin lesions
- Grommets
- Tonsillectomy
- Haemorrhoid surgery
- Hysterectomy for heavy bleeding
- Chalazia removal
- Shoulder decompression
- Carpal tunnel syndrome release
- Dupuytren's contracture release
- Ganglion cyst excision
- Trigger finger release
- Varicose vein surgery

Warrington & Halton Hospitals NHS Foundation Trust introduced what they called the My Choice system in 2013, which enabled people to pay themselves for procedures the NHS would not provide for patients who had been denied varicose vein procedures. In 2019 it was expanded. The price list includes £8,500 for revision of knee replacement surgery, £7,000 for a hip replacement or hip resurfacing, and £2,000 for circumcision. Warrington withdrew their advertisement after an outcry, but in July 2019 it was reported that other trusts with private patient units were still offering these procedures for people who would pay. NHS England sent out a message saying they "expect NHS trusts to be evidence-led in everything they do… The guidance therefore also makes it clear that we do not expect NHS providers to offer these interventions privately." They also said that further restrictions would be raised later in the year. Critics queried the logic of denying NHS trusts the opportunity to generate income.

=== Medicines ===
In the English National Health Service and NHS Wales the Blacklist (officially Schedule 1 to the National Health Service (General Medical Services Contracts) (Prescription of Drugs etc.) Regulations 2004) is a list published in Part XVIIIA of the NHS Drug Tariff denoting medicines and/or specific brands of medicines that cannot be prescribed on NHS medical prescriptions. If such a prescription is dispensed, then NHS Prescription Services will refuse to refund the cost to the dispensing pharmacy. The list was established in 1985. No new items have been added since 2004.

Some brand name medicines on the blacklist can be dispensed against prescriptions for generic drugs (if the approved generic name is not itself included in the blacklist). For example, Calpol can be dispensed for a prescription for paracetamol suspension, but it is generally cheaper to dispense the generic form, and it is at the pharmacy's discretion to do otherwise.

A pharmacist is at liberty to dispense private prescriptions for such items, or to sell over the counter items without a prescription.

==== Review of homeopathic treatments ====
Following a threat of legal action by the Good Thinking Society campaign group in 2015, the British government stated that the Department of Health would hold a consultation in 2016 regarding whether homeopathic treatments should be added to the Schedule 1 list. In 2017 GPs were told not to prescribe homeopathic medicines, but there were actually 3,300 prescriptions for "homeopathic preparations" in 2018, which cost a total of £55,044. This was less than half the number prescribed in 2014. The British Homeopathic Association unsuccessfully challenged NHS England's decision to stop funding homeopathic remedies in June 2018. It is now proposed to add these remedies to the blacklist.

==== National guidelines ====
In April 2017 it was proposed to restrict the prescription of 3,200 Over-the-counter drugs by means of official guidance from NHS England, and to add 18 treatments considered to have 'limited clinical value' – including homeopathy and herbal treatments – to the banned list. The 10 items of low clinical effectiveness:

- Co-proxamol
- Omega 3 fatty acid compounds
- Lidocaine plasters
- Rubefacients
- Dosulepin
- Glucosamine and chondroitin
- Lutein and antioxidants
- Oxycodone and naloxone
- Homeopathy items
- Herbal medicines

7 items which are clinically effective but not cost-effective:

- Liothyronine
- Doxazosin MR
- Perindopril Arginine
- Fentanyl immediate release
- Tadalafil once daily
- Trimipramine
- Paracetamol and tramadol combination product

Dr Andrew Green, clinical policy lead on the British Medical Association general practitioners' committee objected and demanded that any restricted items should be added to the banned list, so that it was clear that they could not be prescribed. The Royal College of General Practitioners complained that "imposing blanket policies on GPs, that don't take into account demographic differences across the country, or that don't allow for flexibility for a patient's individual circumstances, risks alienating the most vulnerable in society." National Voices said, "The risk is that the NHS would be saying that it will not support poor people to treat their kids' head lice, or to manage complications such as persistent constipation or the vulnerability of their skin to damaging sunlight."

The final recommendations covering 35 minor, short-term conditions were approved in March 2018, with an exemption for patients where the clinician believes they will struggle to self-manage because of medical, mental health problems or 'significant social vulnerability'. As this does not change the regulations that govern GP prescribing, it is still open to GPs to treat patients according to their individual circumstances and needs, including issuing prescriptions where there are reasons why self-care is inappropriate.

In 2017 the NHS spent £475.3 million on over-the-counter drugs, and, despite the promises of up to £100 million in savings, £449.4 million in 2018, a reduction of only £25.9 million.

In April 2019 the All Wales Prescribing Advisory Group rejected the proposals for limiting the prescription of over-the-counter drugs. They plan to give further consideration to the prescription of probiotics, and vitamins and minerals.

== See also ==
- Health care rationing
