= Lindley Hall Farm =

Farm in Leicestershire, England

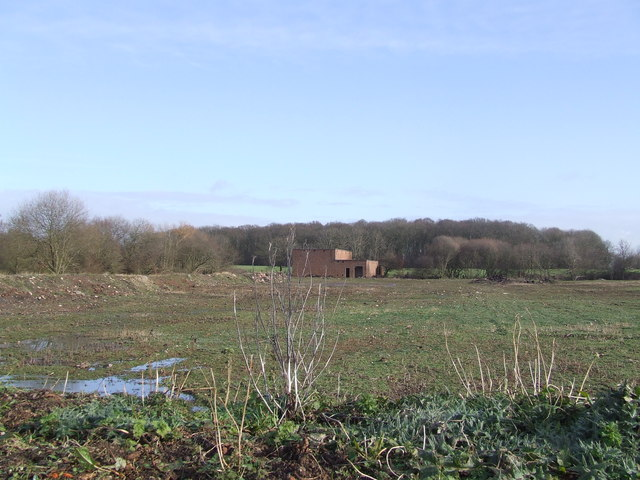
- An image taken at Lindley Hall Farm, at the point which the Ordnance Survey calculated to be the geographical centre of England.
- Town/City: Hinckley and Bosworth, Leicestershire, England
- Coordinates: 52°33′38″N 1°28′13″W
- Owner: Stephen Farmer

Lindley Hall Farm is a farm in Leicestershire, England, in close proximity to Fenny Drayton and Higham on the Hill. The farm is owned by Stephen Farmer. It has been best known as the geographical centre of England since the Ordnance Survey's investigation in 2002. A plaque has been erected by the Ordnance Survey denoting the geographical central point and disputing the historically believed idea that Meriden was the geographical centre.

== History ==
It is unknown when the farm was established, but it was named after the nearby former Lindley Hall, which was once present on the Leicestershire countryside near Higham on the Hill. Five years following the death of the Lindley Hall estate's owner (Lieutenant Commander Francis Eyre RN), Lindley Hall and the Roman Catholic chapel beside it were ultimately demolished, being one of the country houses and estates in the Nuneaton area to fall victim to redevelopment. However, the remains of the old chapel and hall remain at Lindley House, which is built at Lindley Park on the former site of Lindley Hall.

Having been in ownership of the Farmer family, Lindley Hall Farm used to be a dairy farm. However, after an outbreak of foot-and-mouth disease, all of the farm's animals were killed, leading to the farm halting the production of dairy. Following this, the farm would go on to cultivate sheep, cattle, wheat, oats and barley.

=== Gallery ===
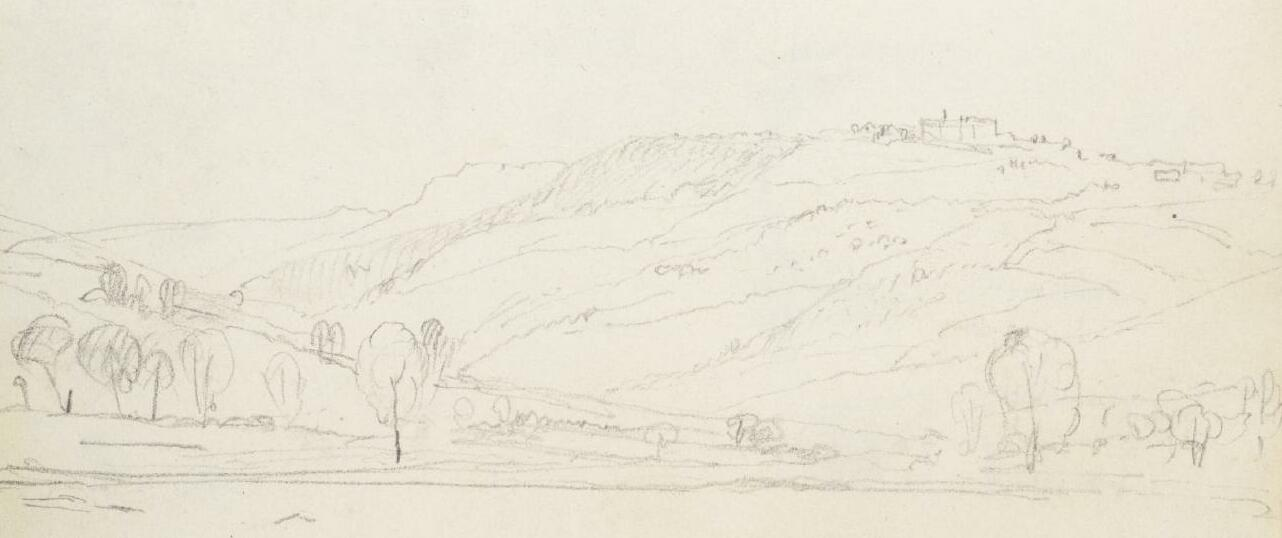
"Lindley hall from Lake Tiny", J._M._W._Turner

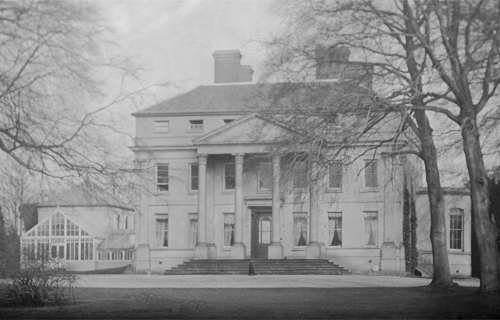
Lindley Hall, Leicestershire, prior to demolition.

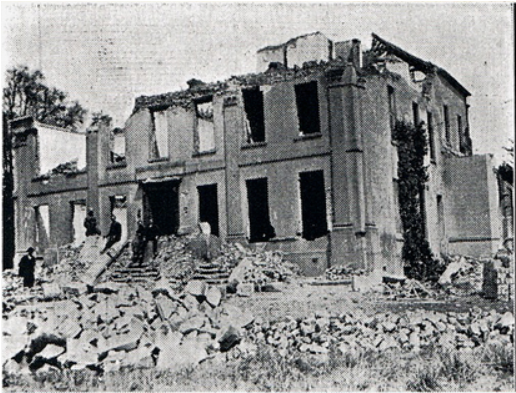
Lindley Hall in the process of being demolished, 22 May 1925.

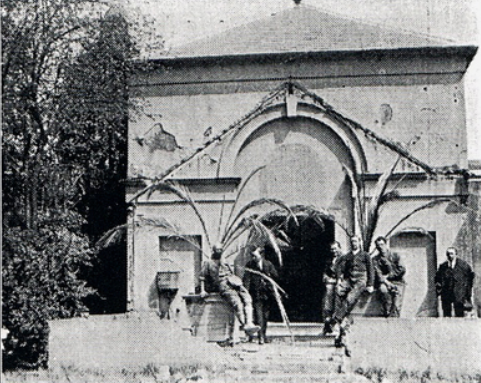
Lindley Chapel, which was demolished alongside Lindley Hall on 22 May 1925.

== Geographical centre of England ==
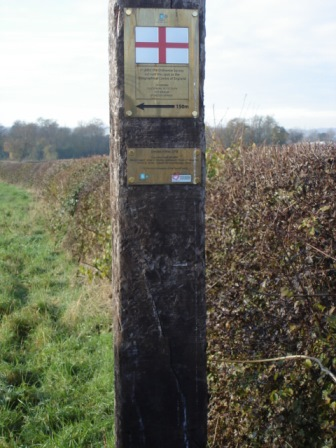
A post marking the geographical centre of England as measured by the Ordnance Survey in Lindley Hall Farm.

In October 2002, using global satellite positioning, the Ordnance Survey initiated a study to find the geographical centre of England, challenging previous myths that the geographical centre of England was located in places such as Meriden in the West Midlands, approximately 11 kilometres to the south of Lindley Hall Farm, which had traditionally claimed to be the geographical centre of England, having a 500-year-old monument claiming the title. They found that the geographical centre was located on a field in Lindley Hall Farm, with the new OS grid reference being SP 36373.66, 96143.05. However, the islands of England were used along with the English mainland to calculate the centre point.

There is also a plaque erected by the Ordnance Survey in one of the farm's fields, reading: "In 2002 the Ordnance Survey defined this spot as the Geographical Centre of England", along with the coordinates and grid reference underneath.

=== Tourism ===
Due to Lindley Hall Farm being private property, tourist access for the proposed geographical central point of England has been restricted. Upon receiving requests to build tearooms on the site of the farm to attract "American tourists", Margaret Farmer (former co-owner of the farm, aged 80 at the time) responded with "I think we are a bit old for this".

However, the current owner of the farm, Stephen Farmer, wishes for the farm to be turned into a tourist attraction, as well as Steve Wegerif, chairman of Hinckley and Bosworth Tourism Partnership, saying that it "seems only right" that the centre of England is located in the farm and that it was "fantastic for the centre to be officially recognised and have it marked in the county."

=== Disputes over status ===
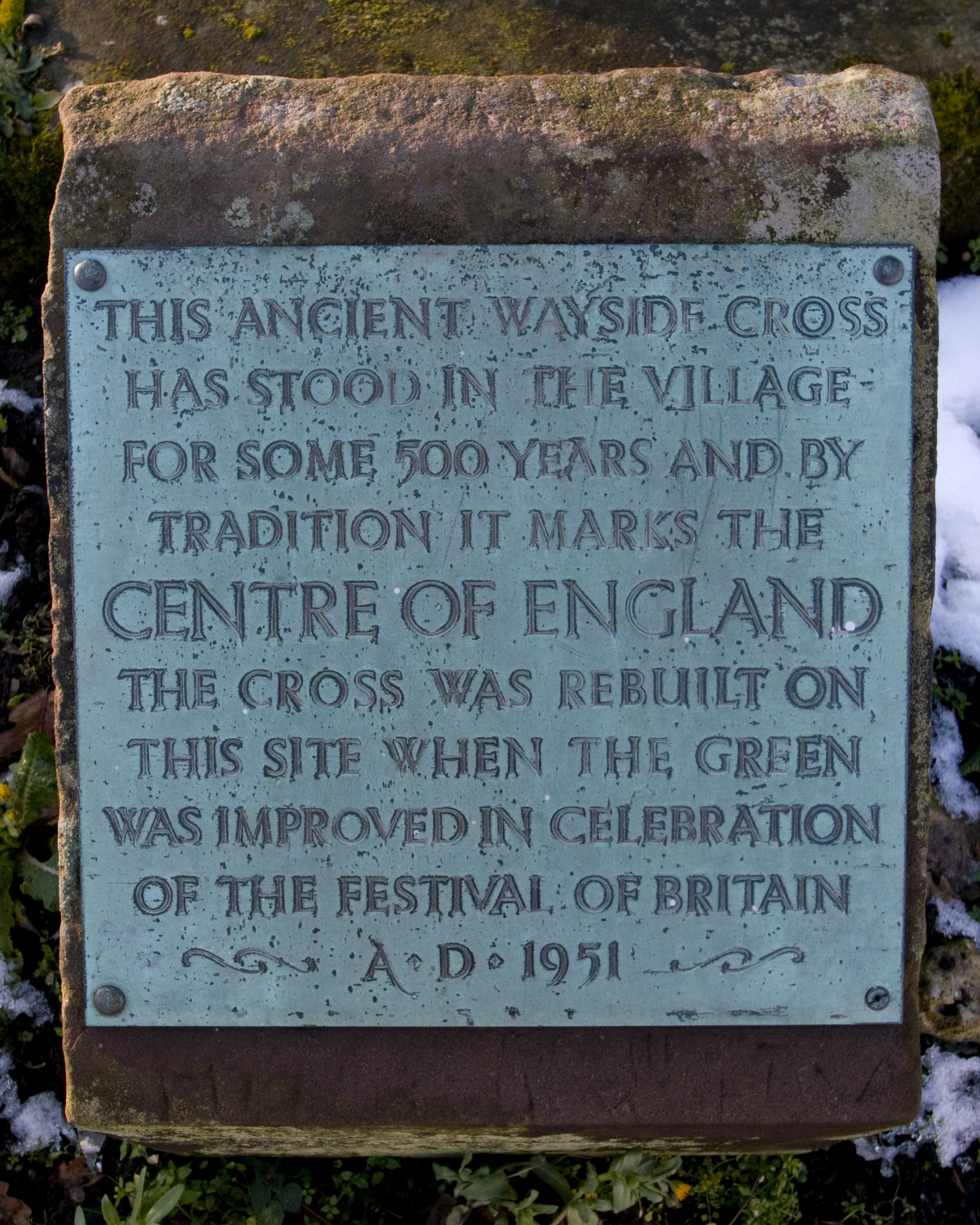
Plaque in Meriden claiming to be the location of the geographical centre of England.

Despite the Ordnance Survey claiming that the geographical centre of England is Lindley Hall Farm, several places are continuing to claim this status. Meriden, the historical geographical centre of England, continues to uphold its status with a plaque describing itself as the centre of England, having made this claim for the past 500 years. Additionally, Morton in Derbyshire makes the same claim, having a sign upon entrance stating "Welcome to Morton, the centre of England." The Midland Oak in Leamington Spa is also said by many to be the geographical centre of England, however, it is not known where the basis for this claim came from.

== See also ==
- Centre points of the United Kingdom
