= Robert Macmillan =

British mechanical engineer (1921–2015)

Robert Hugh Macmillan
- Born: 21 June 1921
- Died: 10 May 2015 (aged 93)
- Engineering career
- Discipline: Mechanical engineering
- Institutions: Swansea University

Robert Hugh Macmillan (27 June 1921 – 10 May 2015) was Professor of Mechanical Engineering at Swansea University and went on to become Director of the Motor Industry Research Association (MIRA) where he installed an early linear induction motor to investigate vehicle safety, as well as overseeing MIRA's successful transition to a commercial research organisation. He ended his career as a Professor at Cranfield University.

== Career overview ==
As a young lecturer at Cambridge University straight after the Second World War, Robert Macmillan wrote the standard text on control systems and a second book on automation, both published by Cambridge University Press in the 1950s. He went on to be appointed Professor of Mechanical Engineering at Swansea University at the young age of 35 and in time became Head of the Engineering Faculty, helping to steer the construction of Swansea's new engineering building. He published another standard text, this time on non-linear control systems.

After eight years at Swansea, in 1964 he took over as Director of the Motor Industry Research Association (MIRA), where he oversaw the installation of the largest industrial linear induction motor in Britain, used for indoor testing of vehicle collisions and which was opened in 1968 by the Minister of Technology, Anthony Wedgwood Benn. Macmillan also transformed MIRA from an organization supported by government funding and a block grant from the Society of Motor Manufacturers and Traders, into a successful commercial research organization.

From MIRA he moved to Cranfield Institute of Technology (now Cranfield University) where he spent five years writing another standard text on the Dynamics of Vehicle Collisions, exploiting the processing power of an early Hewlett Packard scientific desktop computer for the complex calculations.

== Early life ==
Robert Hugh Macmillan was born in 1921 in Mussoorie, a hill station in India. His father, Hugh Robert Munro Macmillan, had been born in Cuttack in India on 25 November 1885, graduated as an Assistant Engineer at Thomason College of Civil Engineering in Roorkee, India (now the Indian Institute of Technology Roorkee) on 15 July 1908, and worked for the Bombay, Baroda and Central India Railway. His ancestors were related to Daniel and Alexander Macmillan, the brothers who founded Macmillan Publishers. His mother Ethel (née Webb) (1889-1957) was the daughter of art teacher Walter Webb and concert pianist and singer Evelyn Green. Ethel was a talented and prolific amateur artist in her own right who studied under Sir Arthur Cope at the Royal Academy Schools, winning the Gold Medal in 1909. She painted in India and later exhibited her work in London to critical acclaim (see example). Her obituary appeared in The Times on 31 August 1957. Walter Webb had a family connection to the silversmiths Mappin & Webb.

The Macmillan family returned from India to England in 1928 and lived at The Pound House in Edenbridge, Kent, his father joining a firm of civil engineers and working on the London drainage system south of the Thames. After Prep School, Robert was awarded a scholarship to Felsted School in Essex. He won school prizes in technical drawing and also excelled at mathematics, which he was taught by Edward Lockwood, a graduate of St John's College, Cambridge.

With the Second World War looming in 1939, Macmillan's mother was keen that he should go to Cambridge. His father having died five years previously, Ethel toured several of the colleges with him; Kings and Trinity both turned him down to read Mathematics, but Emmanuel College, Cambridge agreed to take him to read Mechanical Sciences. Owing to the War, the course was shortened to two years, and he graduated in 1941 with first class honours. He volunteered for the RAF and joined in 1941, training at Andover and Henlow, before being moved to the Gunnery Research Unit at RAF Exeter. Here he was flown around in tail turrets, test-firing gyro sighting systems. He was well suited to the task, being fortunate enough not to suffer at all from air sickness. Later he spent time at the RAF's Rocket Propulsion Establishment.

== Early career in academia ==
After demobilisation he was offered jobs in the RAF, the Civil Service and Cambridge and returned to Cambridge, first as a demonstrator and then as a lecturer teaching mechanics. In 1947 he established the Cambridge Control Group and went on to write his first book Theory of Control which was published by Cambridge University Press and went through three editions. A second book, Automation, Friend or Foe, led to him being regarded as an expert in automation and he was often asked for an opinion by the press, which he found enjoyable but also rather a nuisance. In 1950-51 he spent a year at Massachusetts Institute of Technology on an exchange scheme lecturing in mechanics and structures under the Fulbright Program.

In 1956, at the age of 35, he accepted a chair in mechanical engineering at Swansea University, working alongside two other Cambridge engineering graduates - Bernard Neale as Professor of Civil Engineering, and Wilfred Fishwick as Professor of Electrical Engineering. In time, he became Head of the Engineering Faculty, and a member of the University's Standing Committee. He regarded his biggest achievement at Swansea as influencing the development of the University as a whole, as well as steering the construction of the new engineering building, clearly visible on the skyline as the campus is viewed from the coast.

Macmillan's inaugural lecture was entitled The Communication of Ideas and dealt with the importance of arousing students' interest in engineering and conveying its significance more widely. He continued writing and in 1962 published the book Non Linear Control Systems Analysis, also giving a paper on the topic to the annual conference of FISITA, the International Federation of Automotive Engineering Societies. In the same year, he published Progress in Control Engineering. He served as a member of the Stability and Control Sub-committee which reported to the Mechanics Committee of the Royal Aeronautical Society at the time Concorde was being designed.

== Motor Industry Research Association ==
After eight years at Swansea, he accepted the post of Director of the Motor Industry Research Association (MIRA), moving there in 1964 to take over from Dr Albert Fogg. Originally established in 1945 to assist British car manufacturers to export their products successfully, MIRA provided research and test facilities for the UK automotive industry and was funded by government and motor industry organisations. MIRA had an excellent test track where companies' drivers could test their new models for handling and noise, and also supported specific research projects for individual manufacturers.

Macmillan commissioned the construction of a linear induction motor for accelerating a vehicle quickly to a precise velocity in order to test how it would perform in a collision. The design was based on a prototype developed by Professor Eric Laithwaite at Imperial College, London and the completed facility was opened by the Minister of Technology, Anthony Wedgwood Benn, in April 1968. It operated successfully for more than 25 years, before being passed to the Science Museum, London in the 1990s.

In the early 1970s, the Government's Bessborough report recommended that research organizations should become more market driven, and MIRA's Council agreed that individual members of the Society of Motor Manufacturers and Traders should begin paying their subscriptions directly rather than by way of a general SMMT block research grant. Subsequently, reliance on these subscriptions also declined and MIRA had to stand on its own as a commercial research organization. Macmillan appointed MIRA's first Industrial Liaison Manager to help it develop commercially. Changes to the funding regime were compounded by high levels of inflation during that period and, as Director, Macmillan faced challenging negotiations with the unions over pay and conditions. Just once, in 1975, did the finances go into the red but, despite this, the organization became a successful commercial research organization. On the whole and with his university background, he managed MIRA by operating a collegiate structure in which most could feel part of the decision making process.

During this period, he enjoyed visits through FISITA to Japan and was appointed chairman of the organising committee for the 1970 FISITA conference which was held in Britain. FISITA awarded him their 1970 Gold Medal. He also chaired the British Technical Council of the Motor and Petroleum Industries and saw himself as a ringmaster overseeing negotiations between chief engineers from the motor and petroleum sectors.

== Return to academia ==
After 13 years at MIRA and with his three children now grown up, Macmillan decided he wanted to return to academia. He was approached by the Transport and Road Research Laboratory (now the Transport Research Laboratory) but joined Cranfield University as Professor of Automotive Engineering where he remained for five years until retiring in 1982. During this period he wrote the book of which he later said he was most proud, and which took five years in the writing: Dynamics of Vehicle Collisions. Many of the calculations were undertaken using an early Hewlett Packard scientific desktop computer. Initially he had difficulty in finding a publisher, but it was issued in 1983.

Macmillan stayed in touch with his mathematics master from Felsted who had written six chapters of a book on geometric symmetry. Lockwood asked him for advice on various issues and Macmillan wrote two further chapters; the book Geometric Symmetry was published by Cambridge University Press in 1978 under joint names.

== Mathematical Gazette and other hobbies ==
Macmillan was a regular contributor to the Mathematical Gazette. His first item was a Note published in October 1939 at the age of 18. Fifteen further articles were published between February 1942 and March 2000. Another was part-written but its completion was delayed by the failing health of his wife, Anna, whom he had married in 1950 and whom he devotedly looked after in her last decade (she died in 2012) and it was never finished. He was also a keen philatelist with a particular interest in nineteenth century stamps from The Netherlands, Anna coincidentally being Dutch. A regular exhibitor and medal-winner at Royal Philatelic Society exhibitions and author of articles, in 1996 he published a set of a dozen illustrated articles about stamps used in The Netherlands between 1852 and 1939.

== Career summary ==
- Professor of Mechanical Engineering, Swansea University, 1956-1964;
- Director Motor Industry Research Association 1964-1977;
- Professor of Automotive Engineering and Head of School of Automotive Studies, Cranfield Institute of Technology, 1977-1982 and Dean of Engineering 1980-1982;
- Associate Professor, University of Warwick 1965-1977;
- Member of Council, University of Loughborough, 1966-1981 and 1988-1991;
- Hon DTech University of Loughborough 1992;
- FISITA Gold Medal 1970;
- Member of the Institute of Electrical Engineers;
- Fellow of the Institute of Mechanical Engineers

== Publications ==
- Macmillan, R H (1951) An introduction to the theory of control in mechanical engineering, Cambridge: Cambridge University Press
- Macmillan, R H (1956) Automation, friend or foe?, Cambridge: Cambridge University Press
- Macmillan, R H (1957) The communication of ideas: inaugural lecture at Swansea delivered on 5 December 1957
- Macmillan, R H (1962) Progress in control engineering, New York: Academic Press
- Macmillan, R H editor (1962) Non-linear control systems analysis, Oxford: Pergamon Press
- Macmillan, R H and Lockwood, E H (1978) Geometric Symmetry, Cambridge: Cambridge University Press
- Macmillan, R H (1983) Dynamics of Vehicle Collisions, St Helier: Interscience Enterprises
- Macmillan, R H (1996) The Netherlands: Selected Stamp Issues 1852-1939, published by the Netherlands Philatelic Circle
