= Bridgewater Community Healthcare NHS Foundation Trust =

NHS community trust

- Type: Community health trust
- Established: 1 November 2014
- Disbanded: 1 April 2026
- Headquarters: Spencer House, Birchwood, Warrington, Cheshire, WA3 7PG

Bridgewater Community Healthcare NHS Foundation Trust (Bridgewater) is a leading provider of community health services in the northwest of England.

In 2013/14 Bridgewater was responsible for providing community and specialised health services to 831,270 people living in Halton, St Helens, Warrington and Wigan. In addition Bridgewater provides community dental services in these areas plus Bolton, Tameside, Glossop, Stockport and western Cheshire. Its community services in St. Helens were taken over by a consortium of St Helens and Knowsley Teaching Hospitals NHS Trust, 5 Boroughs Partnership NHS Foundation Trust and St Helens Rota in 2017.

On 1 November 2014, Bridgewater became one of the first two NHS community healthcare trusts in the UK to achieve foundation trust status.

It took on contracts for prison healthcare at five prisons in the north west but decided to relinquish them all in 2019.

Plans were drawn up for the Trust to take over Liverpool Community Health NHS Trust's contract, but were abandoned in March 2017 after NHS Improvement intervened. The Care Quality Commission rated Bridgewater as "requiring improvement" after an inspection in 2016.

In 2019 it began discussions of a merger with Warrington & Halton Hospitals NHS Foundation Trust.

It runs Widnes Urgent Treatment Centre.
