= Midland Oak =

Oak tree in Warwickshire

Coordinates: 52.300062°N 1.529750°W

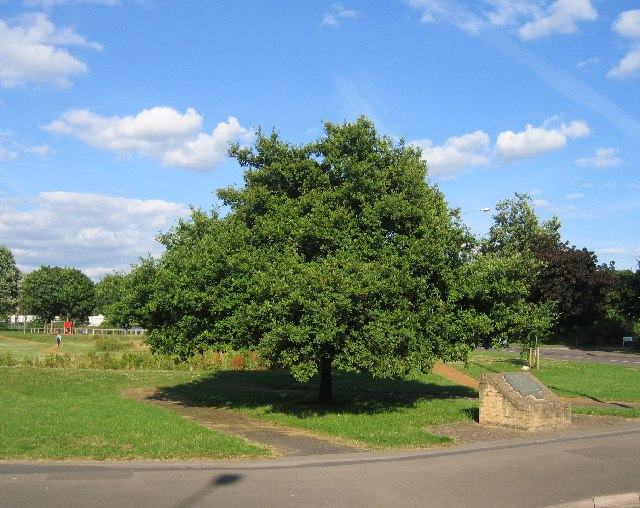
The Midland Oak

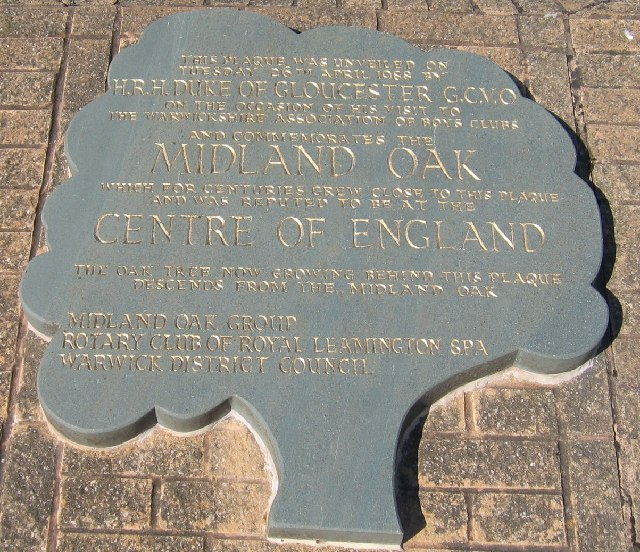
The plaque located nearby

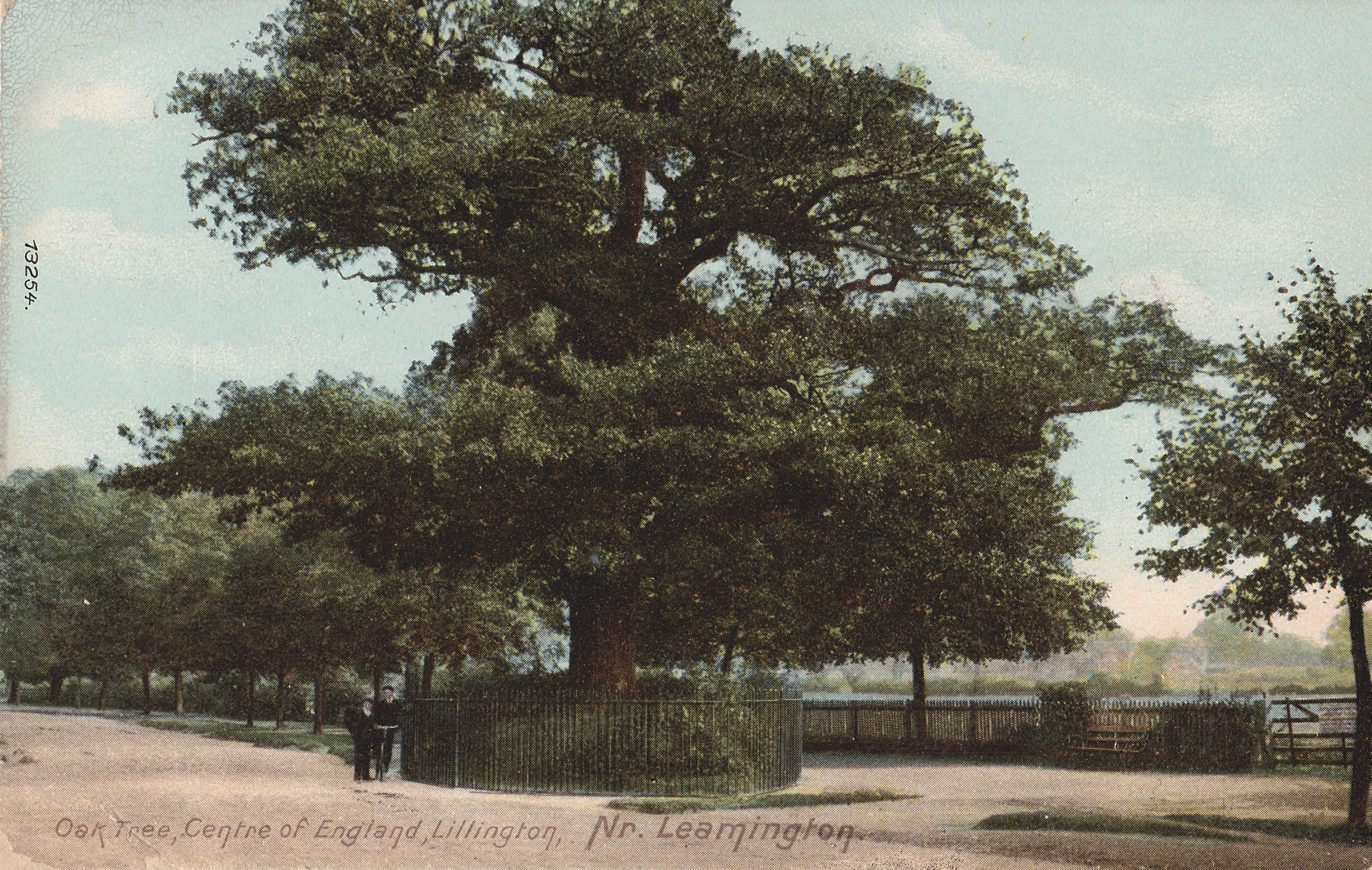
Old oak at Leamington Spa, reputed to mark the centre of England.

The Midland Oak is an oak tree that grows in Leamington Spa, Warwickshire, near the Lillington boundary, at the junction of Lillington Road and Lillington Avenue.

== Tree ==
A plaque nearby unveiled in 1988 states that the old tree, the original centuries old Midland Oak was reputed to mark the centre of England. The present tree was planted about 1988, grown from an acorn saved in 1967 when the old tree, which had died, was cut down. The tree survived the extensive work carried out in 2002, when an underground stream, the Bins Brook, was exposed and an overflow basin was created, to prevent the flooding of nearby houses.

== See also ==
- List of individual trees
