= Lancaster Moor Hospital =

Former hospital in Lancashire, England

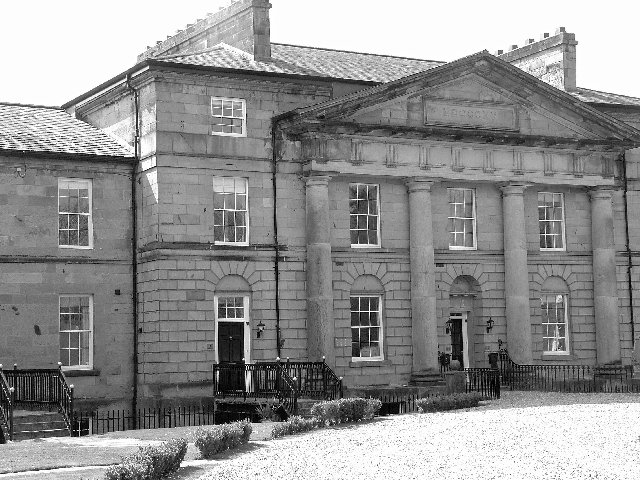
- The 1816 building in 2008

- Location in Lancaster

Geography
- Location: Lancaster, Lancashire, England
- Coordinates: 54.049°N 2.772°W

Organisation
- Type: Specialist

Services
- Speciality: Psychiatry

History
- Former names: Lancashire County Lunatic Asylum (1816–1930); Lancaster County Mental Hospital (1930–48)
- Founded: 1816
- Closed: 2000

Links

Listed Building – Grade II*
- Official name: Moor Hospital, Blocks 40, 41, 42, 44 and 46
- Designated: 24 January 1994
- Reference no.: 1289436

Listed Building – Grade II
- Official name: Moor Hospital, New Block
- Designated: 24 January 1994
- Reference no.: 1195079

Listed Building – Grade II
- Official name: Boundary walls, railings, gates and gate piers at Lancaster Moor Hospital
- Designated: 13 September 2006
- Reference no.: 1391761

Lancaster Moor Hospital, formerly the Lancaster County Lunatic Asylum and Lancaster County Mental Hospital, was a mental hospital in Lancaster, Lancashire, England, which closed in 2000 (the mental health departments left in 1991, but others remained).

== History ==
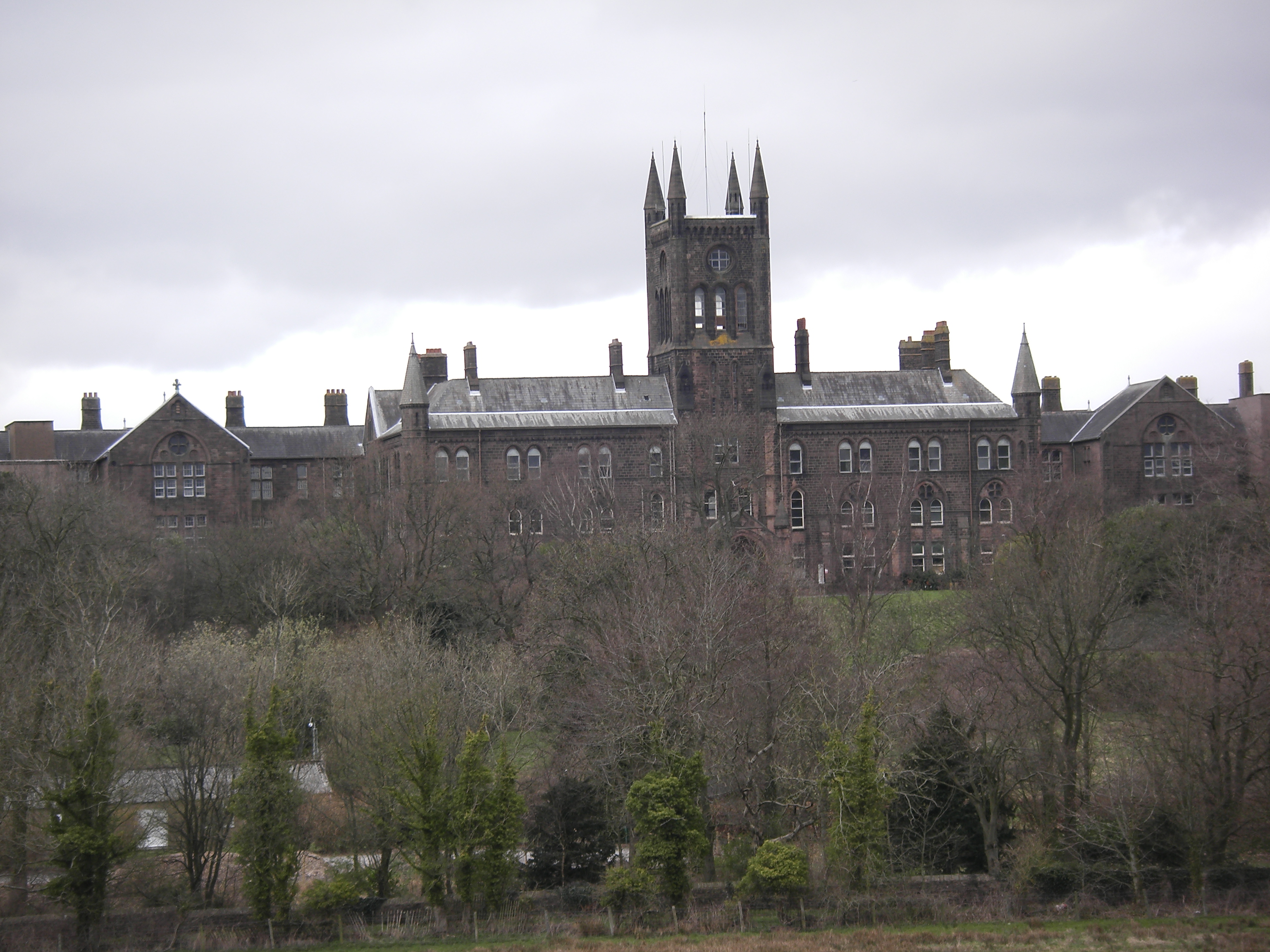
The 1883 building in 2010

The main building, which was designed by Thomas Standen, was opened as the First Lancashire County Asylum in 1816. It was extended at various times until 1850, and is Grade II* listed. A further building, which was designed by Arnold W. Kershaw in the gothic style and known as "the Annexe", was completed in 1883 and is Grade II listed, as are its walls, railings, and gateways. The hospital's chapel, which was designed by Edward Graham Paley, was built in 1866 and is also Grade II listed.

A female doctor, Catherine Arnott, was one of the asylum's early resident Medical Officers.

Campbell House, a facility for paying "gentlemen" patients, was completed in 1909 and the Ladies' Villa, a facility for paying "lady" patients, was completed in 1916. The Ladies' Villa, also known as Ridge Lea, was large enough to be classed separately as a small Mental Asylum.

The hospital was renamed as Lancashire County Mental Hospital in 1930, and as Lancaster Moor Hospital in 1948.

The hospital was a pioneering site for the humane treatment of the mentally ill with the introduction of treatments such as electroconvulsive therapy (ECT). The writer Alan Bennett describes his mother's treatment in the hospital in his memoirs.

Following the introduction of Care in the Community in the early 1980s, the hospital went into a period of decline and closed in 2000. The Ladies Villa "Ridge Lea" was abandoned after closing in 2013. It is currently used as a dog training ground for Lancashire Police and is surrounded by metal fencing to deter urban explorers, as it is a prime area for exploring. A project to convert the annexe and chapel into apartments and to build houses in the grounds, was completed in 2016.

== See also ==
- Grade II* listed buildings in Lancashire
- Listed buildings in Lancaster, Lancashire
- Prestwich Hospital, the second Lancashire County Asylum
- Rainhill Hospital, the third Lancashire County Asylum
- Whittingham Hospital, the fourth Lancashire County Asylum
- Winwick Hospital, the fifth Lancashire County Asylum
- Calderstones Hospital, the sixth Lancashire County Asylum
