= Winwick Hospital =

- North West Boroughs Healthcare NHS Foundation Trust
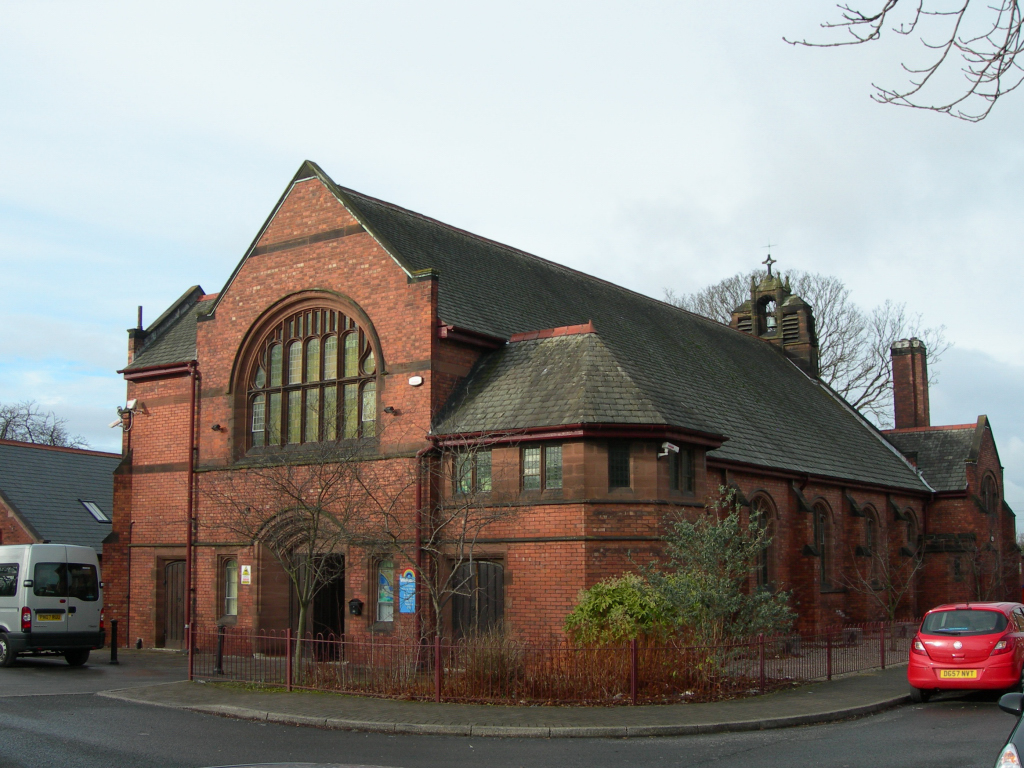
- Former Roman Catholic Chapel at Winwick Hospital

- Shown in Cheshire

Geography
- Location: Winwick, Cheshire, England
- Coordinates: 53.4299°N 2.6045°W

Organisation
- Care system: NHS
- Type: Specialist

Services
- Emergency department: N/A
- Speciality: Psychiatric Hospital

History
- Founded: 1897
- Closed: 1997

Links
- Lists: Hospitals in England

Winwick Hospital was a mental health facility at Winwick, Cheshire, England.

== History ==
The hospital site was previously part of the Winwick Hall estate. The hall, which was initially converted for use as a residential home for boys with mental health difficulties, opened for patients in September 1897. A purpose-built asylum was designed by Henry Crisp, George Oatley and William Swinton Skinner using a Compact Arrow layout and opened as the Fifth Lancashire County Asylum in January 1902. It was requisitioned for military use as the Lord Derby War Hospital during the First World War. After the war the facility became Lancashire County Mental Hospital and it joined the National Health Service as Winwick Hospital in 1948.

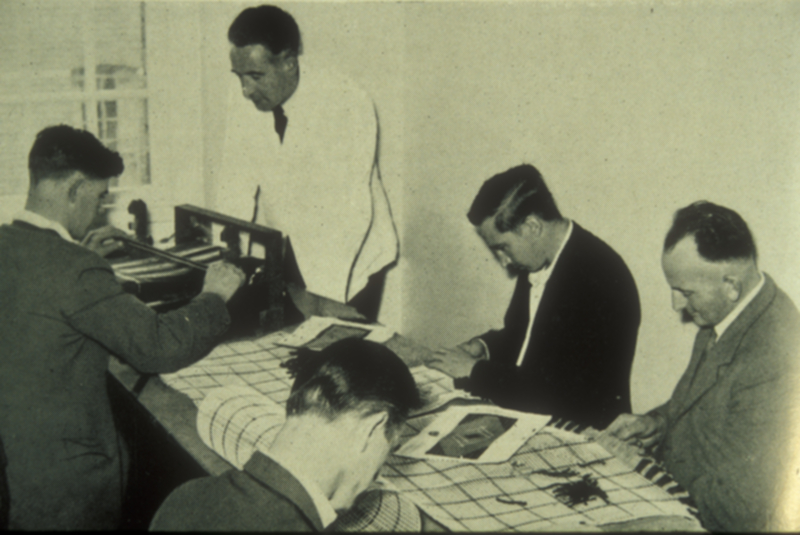
Mental Health occupational therapy at Winwick Hospital, 1957.

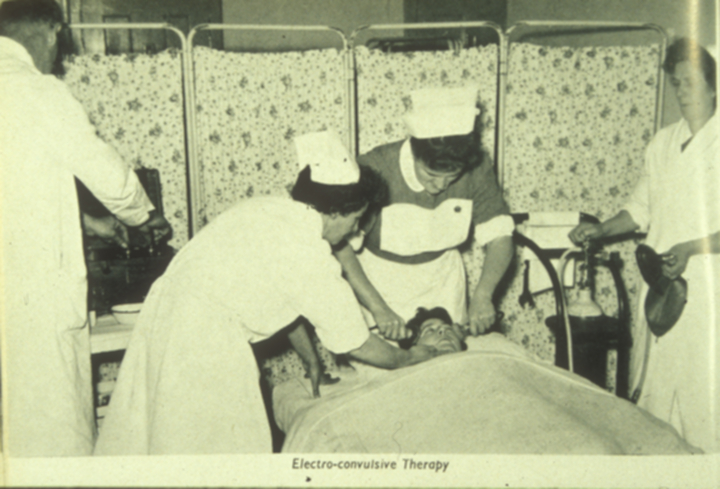
Electroconvulsive Therapy at Winwick Hospital, 1957.

After the introduction of Care in the Community in the early 1980s, the hospital went into a period of decline and closed in March 1997. Apart from the Roman Catholic Chapel, all buildings have been demolished and the site redeveloped for residential use. A small facility known as Hollins Park Hospital, which opened in 1999, remains on the site: Hollins Park Hospital is also the headquarters for North West Boroughs Healthcare NHS Foundation Trust.

== See also ==
- Lancaster Moor Hospital, the first Lancashire County Asylum
- Prestwich Hospital, the second Lancashire County Lunatic Asylum
- Rainhill Hospital, the third Lancashire County Asylum
- Whittingham Hospital, the fourth Lancashire County Asylum
- Calderstones Hospital, the sixth Lancashire County Asylum
