= Warrington Hospital =

- Warrington & Halton Hospitals NHS Foundation Trust
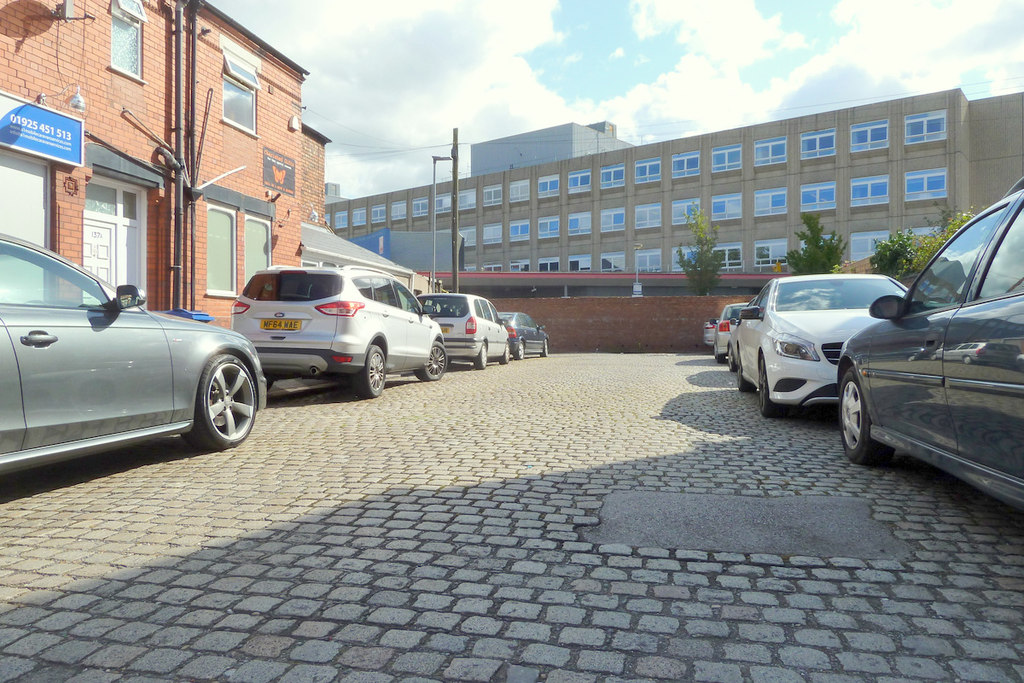
- Warrington Hospital (in the background)

- Shown in Cheshire

Geography
- Location: Warrington, Cheshire, England
- Coordinates: 53.3938°N 2.6097°W

Organisation
- Care system: NHS
- Type: General

Services
- Emergency department: Yes

History
- Founded: 1893; 133 years ago

Links
- Website: www.whh.nhs.uk
- Lists: Hospitals in England

Warrington Hospital is a health facility at Warrington in Cheshire, England. It is managed by Warrington & Halton Hospitals NHS Foundation Trust.

== History ==
The hospital has its origins an isolation hospital which was constructed on the site in 1893. The Warrington Union Workhouse Infirmary was built on the same site and opened in 1898. The site was occupied by the Whitecross Military Hospital during the First World War. The infirmary became the Warrington Borough General Hospital in 1930 and it joined the National Health Service in 1948. Meanwhile, the isolation hospital became known as the Aiken Street Hospital.

The Aiken Street Hospital was demolished in 1973 and the site was redeveloped in stages to facilitate the creation of the Appleton Wing in 1980, the Burtonwood Wing in 1988, the Croft Wing in 1994 and the Daresbury Wing in 1998.

Management of the hospital passed to the Warrington General Hospital NHS Trust in 1993. A new £6.25 million intensive care unit opened in February 2009.
