= Drug Tariff =

The Drug Tariff, also known as Drug Tariff price, is the amount that the NHS in England and Wales that repays pharmacies for generic prescription medications. It differs from prescription charges which are £9.90 per item/drug as of April 2024 unless exemptions apply.

They are published monthly by NHS Prescription Services, and used as a reference in England and Wales by pharmacists or doctors dispensing in primary care. It covers such issues as the costs of prescription payments for patients, costs of appliances and blacklisted medicines.

== See also ==
- Pharmacopeia
- Pharmacy
- Royal Pharmaceutical Society of Great Britain
