= Prestwich Hospital =

English mental health facility

- Greater Manchester Mental Health NHS Foundation Trust
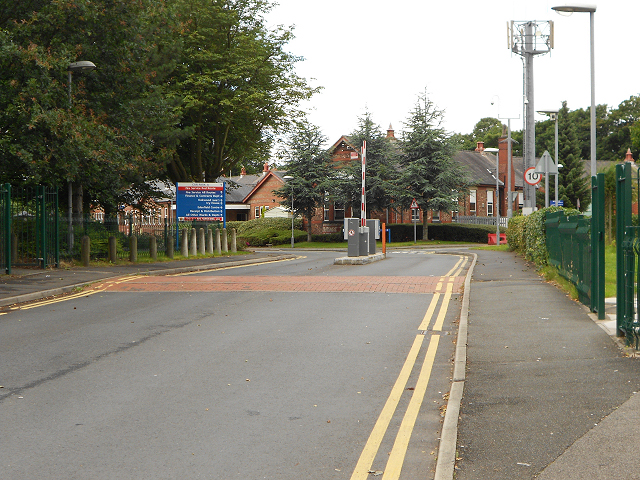
- Prestwich Hospital

- Shown in Greater Manchester

Geography
- Location: Prestwich, Greater Manchester, England
- Coordinates: 53.5365°N 2.2899°W

Organisation
- Care system: NHS
- Type: Psychiatric

Services
- Emergency department: No

History
- Founded: 1851

Links
- Website: www.gmmh.nhs.uk
- Lists: Hospitals in England

Prestwich Hospital is a mental health facility in Prestwich, Greater Manchester, England.

== History ==
The site was selected at Prestwich Woods and acquired from Oswald Milne, a solicitor, in 1847. The hospital was designed by Isaac Holden, a Manchester architect. It was built of red brick with stone quoin decoration and officially opened, with 350 patients, as the Second Lancashire County Lunatic Asylum in January 1851. Two extra wards were completed in 1864 and an annex was built in 1883.

By 1903 it was accommodating 3,135 patients making it the largest asylum in Europe. Montagu Lomax, assistant medical officer at the hospital between 1917 and 1919, exposed the inhuman, custodial and antitherapeutic practices there in his book The Experiences of an Asylum Doctor, which led to a Royal Commission, increased central control and ultimately the Mental Treatment Act 1930. The National Asylum Workers' Union organised a strike of 200 employees at the hospital in 1918.

The facility was renamed the Prestwich Mental Hospital in 1923. It was used for war casualties during the Second World War and then joined the National Health Service in 1948.

Much of what Dr Lomax had described much earlier could still be seen in parts of Prestwich Hospital in the 1960s and 1970s. However, following the introduction of Care in the Community in the early 1980s, the hospital went into a period of decline and closed to long-term patients in 1996.

The hospital gave rise to the local saying "going to Prestwich" which means going mad.

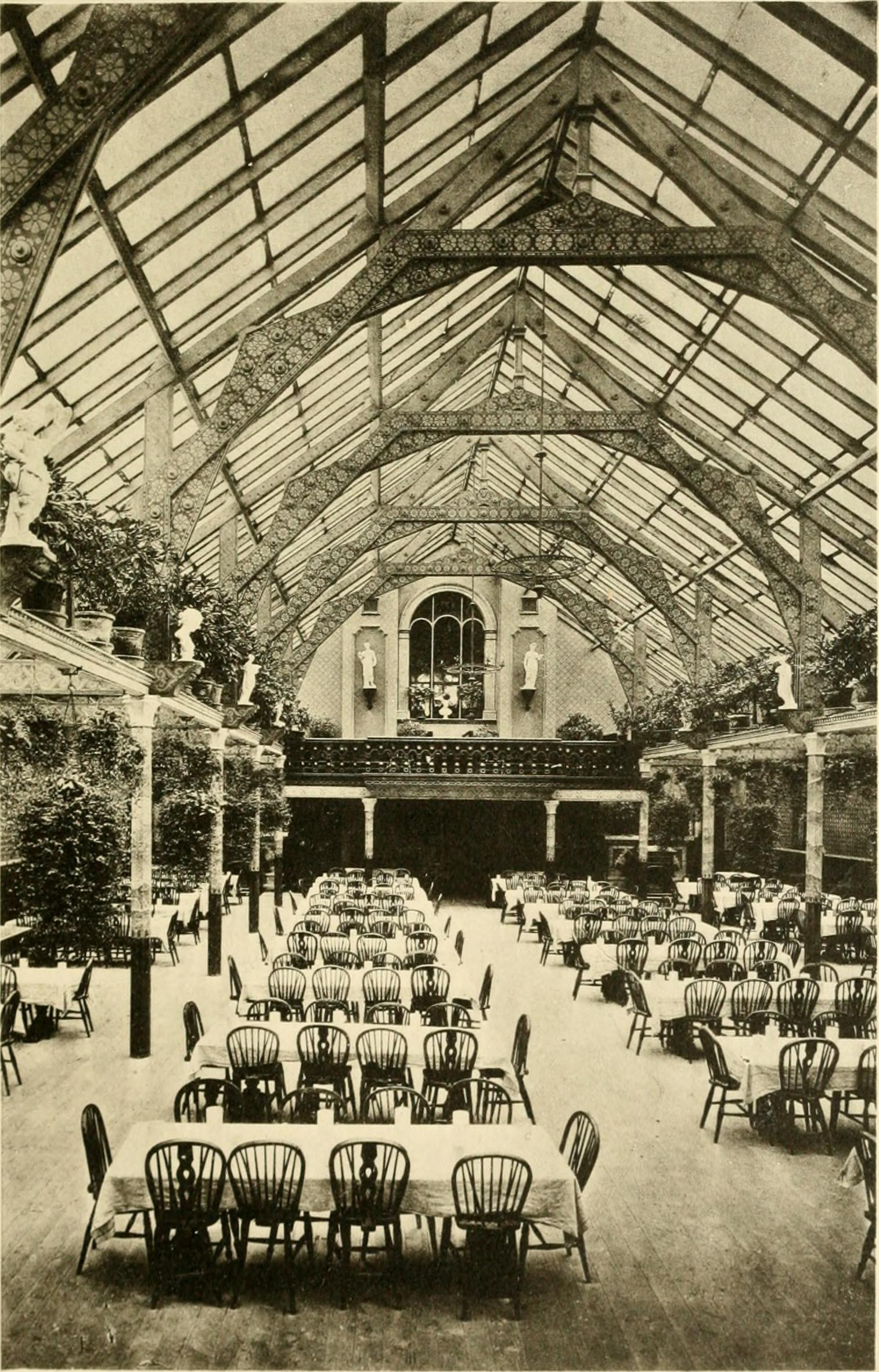
The dining hall of Lancaster County Asylum, Prestwich, c. 1887

== See also ==
- Lancaster Moor Hospital, the first Lancashire County Lunatic Asylum
- Rainhill Hospital, the third Lancashire County Lunatic Asylum
- Whittingham Hospital, the fourth Lancashire County Lunatic Asylum
- Winwick Hospital, the fifth Lancashire County Lunatic Asylum
- Calderstones Hospital, the sixth Lancashire County Lunatic Asylum
