= Warrington and Halton Teaching Hospitals NHS Foundation Trust =

NHS hospital trust

Warrington and Halton Hospitals NHS Foundation Trust was created on 1 December 2008 from what was formerly known as North Cheshire Hospitals NHS Trust. The trust comprises Warrington Hospital, Halton General Hospital in Runcorn and Houghton Hall in Warrington and is responsible for a budget of around £200 million per annum.

4,100 staff work across the hospitals and provide access to care for a population of over 500,000 people.

In 2019 the trust began discussions of a merger with Bridgewater Community Healthcare NHS Foundation Trust.

== My choice ==
The trust introduced what they called the My Choice system in 2013, which enabled people to pay themselves for procedures the NHS would not provide for patients who had been denied varicose vein procedures. This is not described as a private patients service. According to the trust: "All procedures are carried out as part of the Trust’s normal elective programme." In 2019 it was expanded. The price list includes £8,500 for revision of knee replacement surgery, £7,000 for a hip replacement or hip resurfacing, and £2,000 for circumcision.

== Information technology ==
Warrington Hospital has what is said to be the oldest fax machine in the NHS, purchased by the trust in 1998. The trust says use of HealthRoster software has permitted them to reduce the use of bank and agency staff.

Lorenzo patient record systems are being introduced to the Trust during 2015.

== Houghton Hall ==
Opened in December 2008 this 39-bed facility in the Orford area of Warrington was run by the hospital trust and offered therapy and rehabilitation for people who no longer require medical care in an acute hospital bed but need some further support before returning home. Houghton Hall closed in March 2011 with services provided in other settings in the town.

== Performance ==
The trust was one of 26 responsible for half of the national growth in patients waiting more than four hours in accident and emergency over the 2014/15 winter.

In June 2019 it was advertising that patients could pay privately for operations on the NHS treatments blacklist which the NHS would not pay for, but withdrew the advertisement after widespread criticism.

== See also ==
- List of hospitals in England
- List of NHS trusts
