= Whittingham Hospital =

Former psychiatric hospital in Lancashire, England

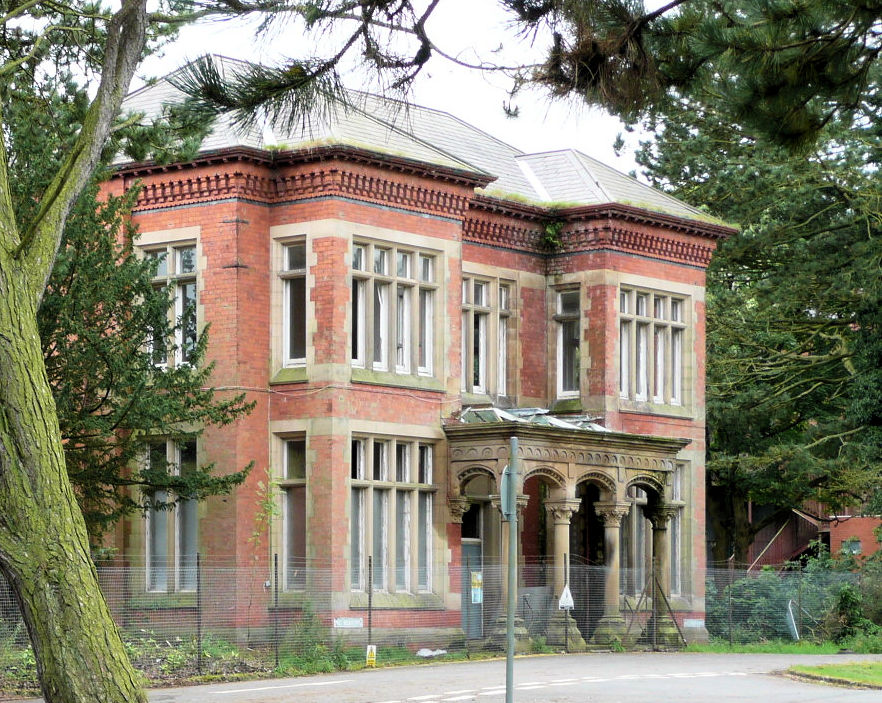
- The main building entrance (St Luke's Division) in 2008

- Shown in the City of Preston district

Geography
- Location: Whittingham, Lancashire, England
- Coordinates: 53.817°N 2.658°W

Organisation
- Care system: NHS
- Type: Specialist

Services
- Emergency department: No
- Beds: 3533 in 1939
- Speciality: Psychiatric hospital

Helipads
- Helipad: No

History
- Founded: 1 April 1873
- Closed: 1995

Whittingham Hospital was a psychiatric hospital in the parish of Whittingham, near Preston, Lancashire, England. The hospital opened in 1873 as the Fourth Lancashire County Asylum and grew to be the largest mental hospital in Britain, and pioneered the use of electroencephalograms (EEGs). It closed in 1995.

== History ==
=== Early years ===
In 1866 the first three Lancashire lunatic asylums, at Prestwich, Rainhill and Lancaster, were deemed to be full. Extra accommodation was urgently needed and to this end the building of Whittingham Asylum "for pauper lunatics" began in 1869. The hospital was designed by Henry Littler of Manchester, architect to the Lancashire Asylums Board and built of red brick made from clay dug on site. The buildings followed a plan of multiple quadrangles with inter-connecting corridors radiating from a long axial corridor section.

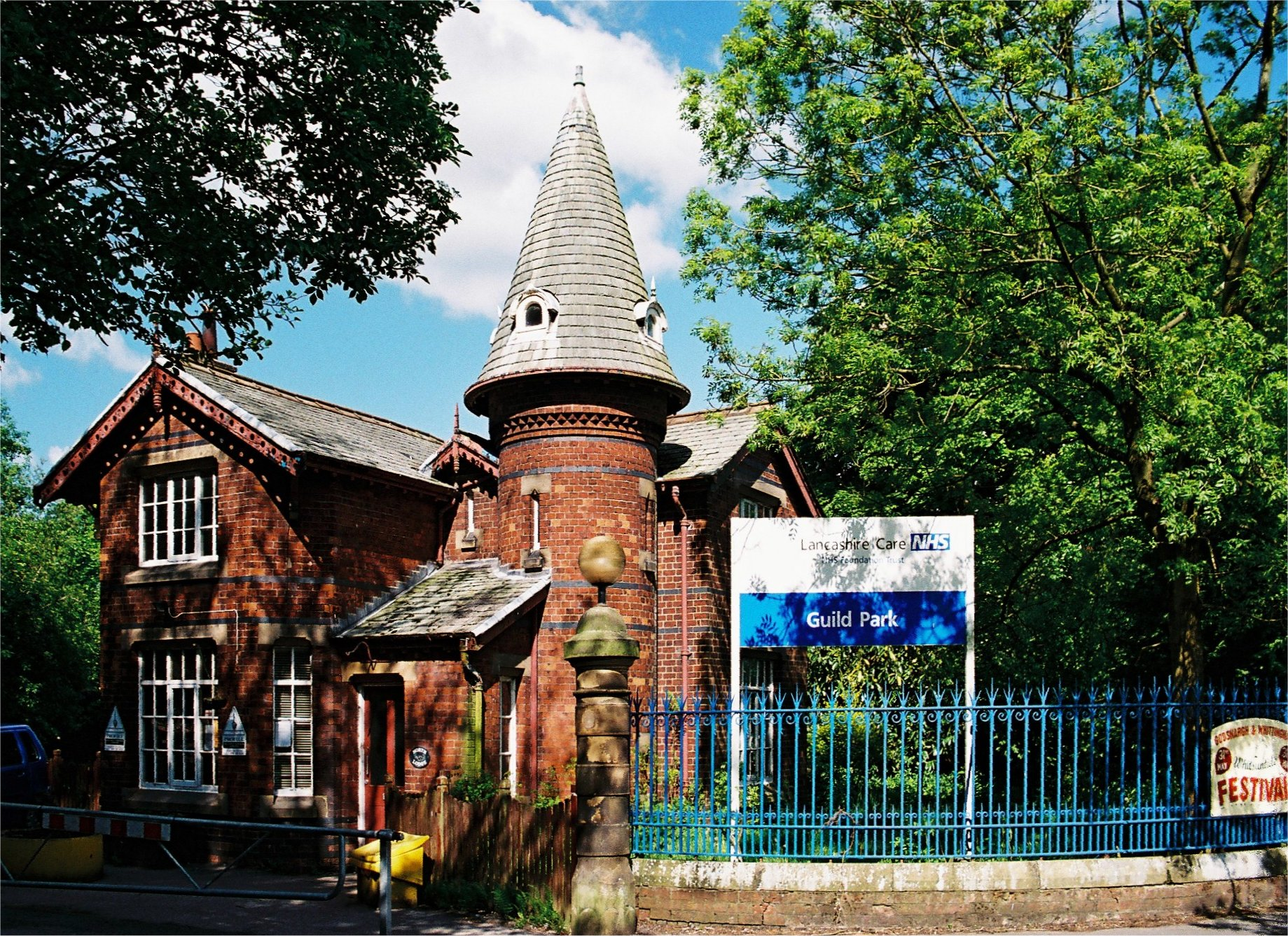
North Lodge, the entrance to Guild Park, the grounds of the former Whittingham Hospital

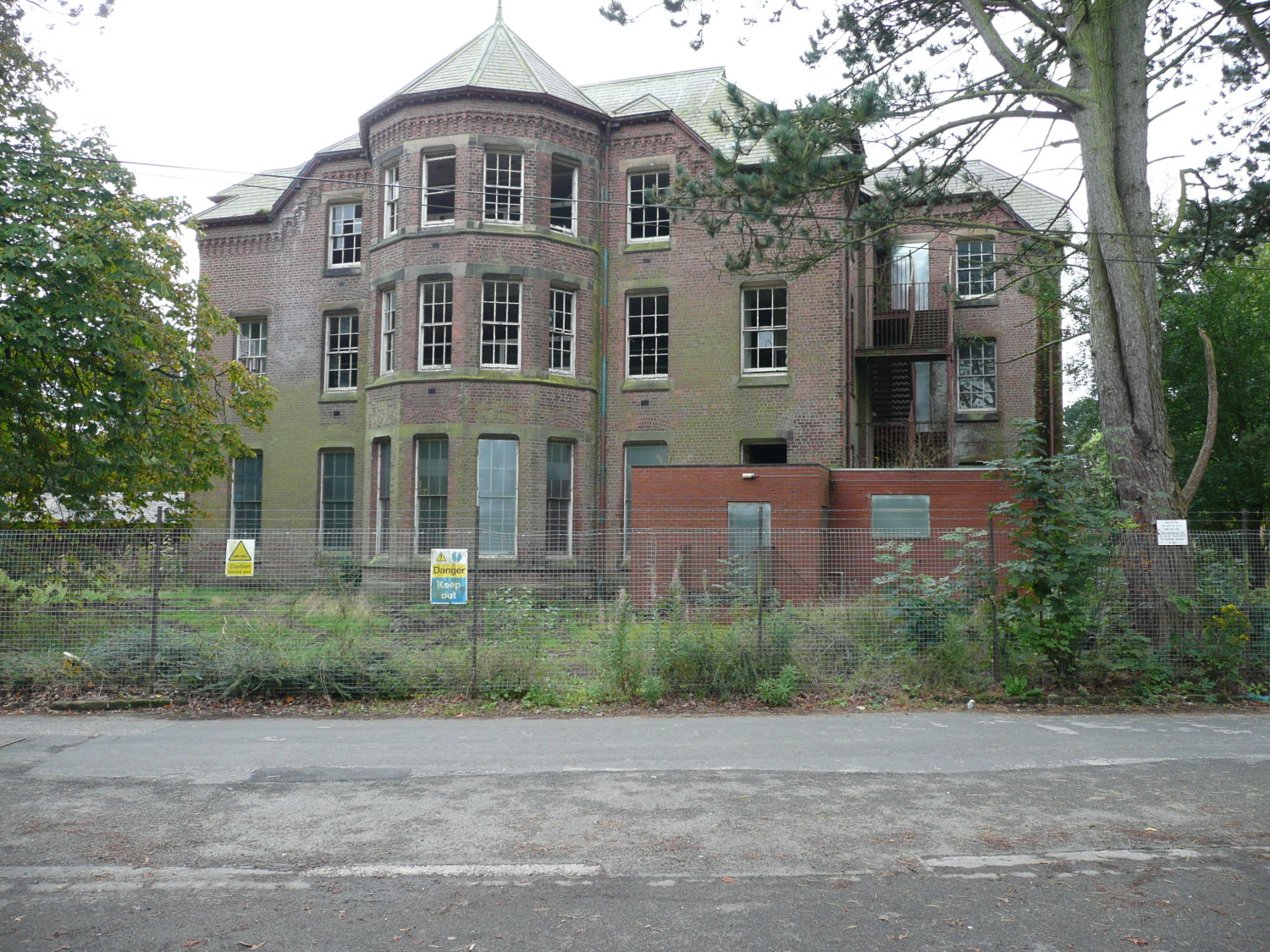
A ward exterior pictured in 2008

The hospital was officially opened as the Fourth Lancashire County Lunatic Asylum on 1 April 1873, although 115 patients had already been admitted in the previous year, some of whom helped with the building work. The large complex (to be known as St. Luke's Division from 1958) was completed in June 1875; it had an initial capacity of 1,100 inmates and included an Anglican church, a Catholic chapel, a recreation hall and a large farm estate. Before long it also had its own railway, telephone exchange, post office, reservoirs, gas works, brewery, orchestra, brass band, ballroom and butchers' shop.

In 1878 a new annexe (known as St. John's Division from 1958) was built on 68 acres (28 ha) of land to the north of the site. The annexe was completed in 1880 and could accommodate 700 patients and, by the special agreement of the Postmaster General, the hospital's own dedicated Post Office. The hospital contributed £15,500 towards Fulwood Urban District Council's scheme to extract water from Beacon Fell, in exchange for 90,000 gallons of water per day to be supplied, free of charge, to the hospital. This was achieved under the Fulwood and Whittingham Water Act 1882 (45 & 46 Vict. c. xi). In 1884, a sanatorium was established in the grounds for patients with infectious diseases.

In 1892 works began for the grounds to be illuminated by electric lamps; these works were completed in 1894. In 1900 an annexe called Cameron House was opened to the northwest of the main building, joined in 1912 by a third annexe, later to become known as St Margaret's Division in 1958. By 1915 the number of inmates was recorded as 2,820 – more than double the asylum's original capacity.

=== First World War ===
Map of the hospital

In 1918 the New West Annexe (St Margaret's) was commandeered for the treatment of war casualties: patients who died during treatment were buried in the institution's private cemetery at the northern edge of the site. The hospital was returned to civilian use the following year following the cessation of hostilities.

=== Inter-war years ===
The National Asylum Workers' Union organised a strike of 429 employees at the hospital in 1918. In 1923, the name "Whittingham Asylum" was dropped in favour of "Whittingham Mental Hospital", a change later reinforced in law by the Mental Treatment Act 1930. In 1929, the Hospital Commissioners noted that an "open door" principle was practised on a number of wards, and the 1930 Act later resulted in the admission of the first voluntary patients. By 1939, the number of patients was 3533, with a staff of 548, making it the largest mental hospital in Great Britain.

=== Second World War ===
At the outbreak of the Second World War in 1939, Wards 31 to 36 in the West Annexe were again commandeered by the military and mental patients were relocated to other hospitals in the area. The commandeered wards were renamed the Whittingham Emergency Hospital and treated casualties of war, both military and civilian, the first being evacuees from Dunkirk. Following the end of the conflict the wards were returned to civilian use in 1946.

=== Post-war ===
In 1948, the hospital became part of the newly formed National Health Service and was renamed "Whittingham Hospital". In the same year it acquired Ribchester Hospital, originally a workhouse.

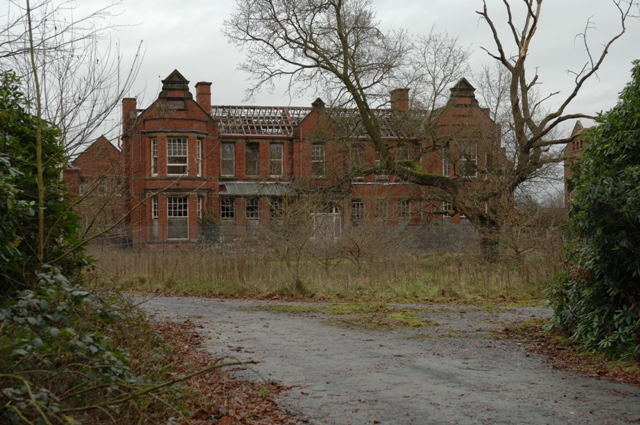
Cameron House Division in 2006

While working at the hospital during the 1950s, Dr C.S. Parker and Mr Charles Breakall produced an early electroencephalograph (EEG) machine using War Surplus material purchased for £2.10.0d. (£2.50) and conducted pioneering experiments in the field of encephalography and mental illness using patients there. An article was published in The Lancet describing these experiments, and considerable interest was said to have been expressed by the American Department for Space Medicine at the time.

From 1965 to 1968 English rock musician Kevin Coyne worked at the hospital as a social therapist and psychiatric nurse and it was whilst at Whittingham that his son Robert was born. His 1972 album Case History was in part inspired by his work at the hospital.

=== Abuse scandal and enquiry ===
On 18 July 1967, the Student Nurses' Association held a meeting with the senior nursing tutor, submitting serious complaints of cruelty, ill-treatment and fraud in the hospital. The Head Male Nurse then called a meeting of all students in which the students were threatened with actions for libel and slander. Several further complaints were suppressed until the following year when the hospital management committee finally intervened and announced an inquiry into allegations of corruption and abuse. The inquiry divided the allegations into three specific headings: Care of Patients, Organisation of Services and Financial Control. The enquiry heard (among others) the following complaints:

- That patients had been left untreated
- That some patients had been given only bread and jam to eat or had been given food mixed up and served as "slops"
- That some patients had been locked outside, regardless of weather conditions, or in washrooms and cupboards.
- That in one ward, students had witnessed patients being dragged about by their hair.
- That on ward 3, a male ward, patients were given "wet towel treatment", which involved twisting a cold, wet towel or bed sheet round a patient's neck until the patient lost consciousness. Patients were also seen to have been punched and locked in a storeroom.
- On ward S2, another male ward, it was alleged that two male nurses had poured methylated spirits into the slippers of one patient and into the dressing gown pocket of another and set them alight.

It was also reported that some wards were infested with vermin and others were too cold, too hot or too damp. In addition, it was found that there was a culture of petty theft on the wards and of serious fraud and embezzlement in some administrative offices.

In 1968–69, £91,000 was issued from sources for the use of patients, yet only £42,000 was recorded as having been spent in the hospital shop, supposedly leaving the remaining £49,000 unaccounted for.

As a result of the investigation, both the Head Male Nurse and the Matron took 'early retirement'. Two male nurses were convicted of theft and in a separate incident another nurse was jailed for manslaughter after an elderly patient he had assaulted later died. Two other nurses were charged but acquitted.

=== Documentary ===
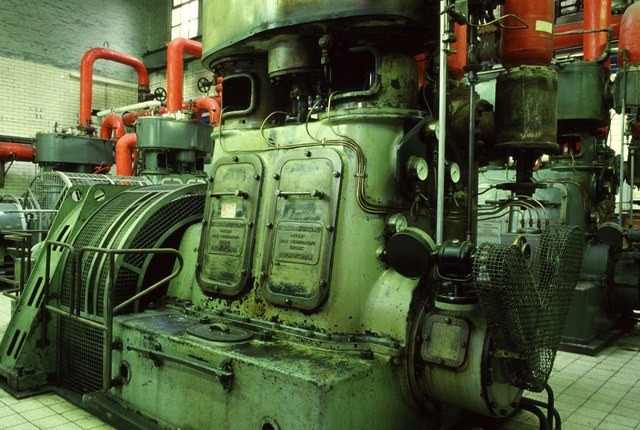
One of four Belliss and Morcom engines used to generate the hospital's electricity supply, pictured in 1986

Ray Gosling and Nick Broomfield spent three weeks in the hospital filming a documentary for Granada Television, broadcast on ITV on 26 August 1975. It was Broomfield's first television film.

=== Decline and closure ===
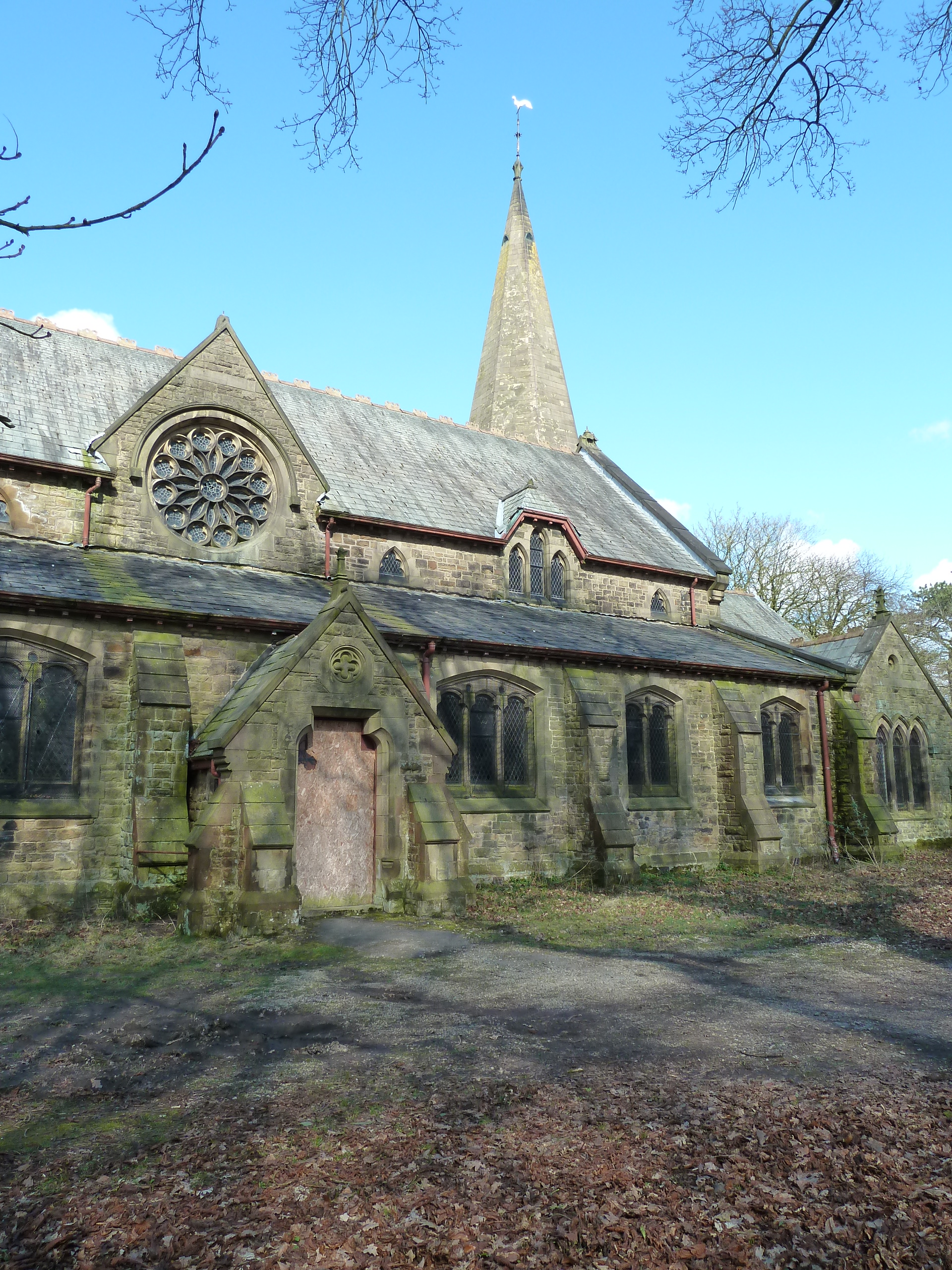
The disused St John's Anglican Church in the hospital grounds, a Grade II listed building

During the 1970s and 1980s, new drugs and therapies were introduced to treat people suffering from mental illnesses. Long-stay patients were returned to the community or dispersed to smaller units around Preston. The hospital closed in 1995 and the site subsequently became known as "Guild Park". In 1999, Guild Lodge was opened on the edge of Guild Park, providing secure mental healthcare services to a small number of patients, followed the next year by purpose-built rehabilitation cottages close by.

It is planned to build 650 new homes on the site and to convert some of the hospital buildings for use as apartments. St John's and St Margaret's divisions have been demolished. Due to uncertainty over the construction of the Broughton bypass and the economic downturn there was little further progress, and the remaining buildings were left derelict, a popular destination for urban exploration. In 2014, planning permission was renewed and extended, and demolition of almost all of the remaining buildings resumed. The grade II listed St John's Church and five blocks, including St Luke's main entrance block, had originally been scheduled to be retained, along with some sporting and recreational facilities. Demolition was completed by 2016. In April 2021 Preston council approved urgent repair work to St John's church to maintain the fabric of the building.

== Whittingham Hospital Railway ==
The Whittingham Hospital Railway was a two-mile (3 km) private branch to Grimsargh, built in 1887, to transport coal and other goods. It also provided free transport for staff and passengers. It eventually closed in on 30 June 1957.

== See also ==
- Lancaster Moor Hospital, the first Lancashire County Asylum
- Prestwich Hospital, the second Lancashire County Lunatic Asylum
- Rainhill Hospital, the third Lancashire County Asylum
- Winwick Hospital, the fifth Lancashire County Asylum
- Calderstones Hospital, the sixth Lancashire County Asylum
