= Calderstones Hospital =

- Mersey Care NHS Foundation Trust
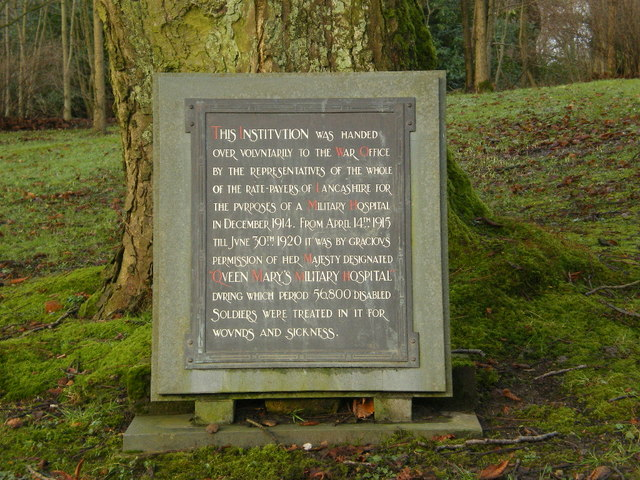
- Plaque in the hospital grounds

- Shown in Lancashire

Geography
- Location: Whalley, Lancashire, England
- Coordinates: 53.8276°N 2.4215°W

Organisation
- Care system: NHS
- Type: Specialist

Services
- Emergency department: N/A
- Speciality: Psychiatric Hospital

History
- Founded: 1915

Links
- Lists: Hospitals in England

Calderstones Hospital is a mental health facility near to Whalley, Lancashire, England. It is managed by Mersey Care NHS Foundation Trust.

== History ==
The hospital is located on a site known as Clay Fields which previously formed part of the Whalley Abbey estate. It was designed by Henry Littler in the Neo-Georgian style using a dual pavilion layout and, although commissioned, in 1904, as the Sixth Lancashire County Asylum, it actually opened as Queen Mary's Military Hospital in April 1915 during the First World War. Some 56,800 allied servicemen were treated at the hospital between 14 April 1915 and 31 June 1920.

After the war, the hospital reopened in June 1921, as a mental health facility, known as Calderstones Hospital. After the introduction of Care in the Community in the early 1980s, the hospital went into a period of decline and, although its closure was announced, union leaders were advised that the decision was unlikely to be implemented before 2020. As of June 2019 it was the only NHS hospital in the United Kingdom to specialise in learning disabilities.

== See also ==
- Lancaster Moor Hospital, the first Lancashire County Asylum
- Prestwich Hospital, the second Lancashire County Asylum
- Rainhill Hospital, the third Lancashire County Asylum
- Whittingham Hospital, the fourth Lancashire County Asylum
- Winwick Hospital, the fifth Lancashire County Asylum
