= Halton General Hospital =

- Warrington & Halton Hospitals NHS Foundation Trust
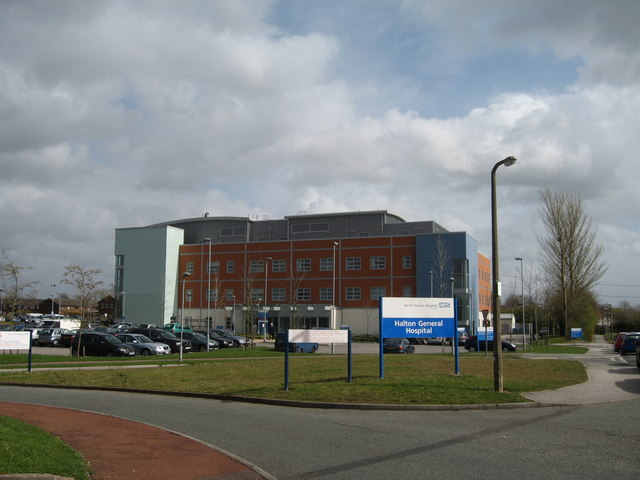
- Halton General Hospital

- Shown in Cheshire

Geography
- Location: Runcorn, England
- Coordinates: 53.3239°N 2.6943°W

Organisation
- Care system: NHS
- Type: General

Services
- Emergency department: No

History
- Founded: 1976

Links
- Website: www.whh.nhs.uk

Halton General Hospital is a health facility in Runcorn, England. It is managed by the Warrington & Halton Hospitals NHS Foundation Trust.

== History ==
The first phase of the hospital, which consisted of out-patient facilities, opened on 21 September 1976. The second phase, which involved in-patient facilities, was completed in 1985. Management of the hospital passed to the Halton General Hospital NHS Trust in 1993.

The minor injuries unit was refurbished in 2003, and a new urgent care centre was established in 2015. Plans were proposed in 2018 to demolish the hospital and replace it with a modern treatment centre.
