= Rainhill Hospital =

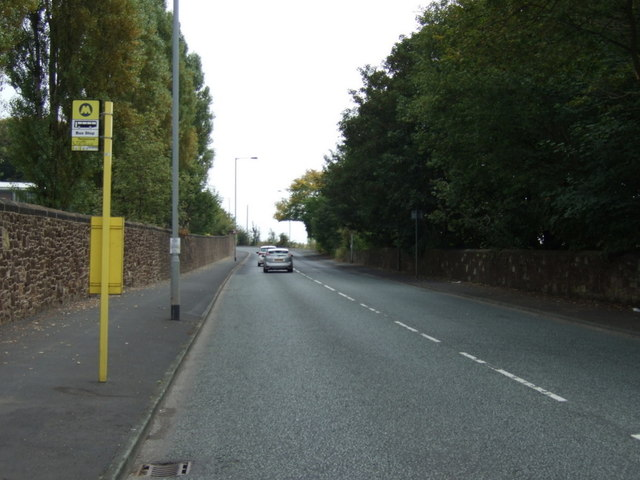
- The site (on the left) where the hospital used to be

- Shown in Merseyside

Geography
- Location: Rainhill, Merseyside, England
- Coordinates: 53.4256°N 2.7647°W

Organisation
- Care system: NHS
- Type: Psychiatric

Services
- Emergency department: No

History
- Founded: 1851
- Closed: 1992
- Demolished: In stages during the 1990s.

Links
- Lists: Hospitals in England

Rainhill Hospital was a very large psychiatric hospital complex that was located in Rainhill, Merseyside, England.

Founded in 1851 as the then Third Lancashire County Lunatic Asylum, the hospital was repeatedly expanded until the 1980's when a mixture of administrative changes and changes in policy saw patient services transfer to newer facilities and care in the community. Closed in 1992 and subsequently demolished, the site was redeveloped into a retirement village.

== History ==
The facility was designed by Harvey Lonsdale Elmes and opened as the Third Lancashire County Lunatic Asylum on 1 January 1851. Additional wings designed by Henry Horner were completed in 1860. It became the County Lunatic Asylum, Rainhill in 1861.

In 1877 a new annexe was designed by George Enoch Grayson and Edward Ould and constructed to the north-west of Rainhill Road. The annexe would later become known as the Avon Division. The Avon Division was designed to facilitate the accommodation of long-term, chronically mentally ill patients who were breaching capacity on what became known as the Sherdley Division which was subsequently mainly used for acute cases. The Avon Division was noted for its distinctive water towers and linear design. Some new buildings designed in a Tudor Revival style were added to the Avon Division in around 1900.

The hospital was the location of the Great Porridge Strike on 6 April 1913 when the staff, members of the National Asylum Workers' Union, went on strike in protest when meat was replaced by oatmeal porridge. The facility became the County Mental Hospital, Rainhill in 1923 and at the peak of its activity, in the 1930s, there were approximately 3,000 inpatients resident at the hospital.

From 1938 to 1949 the admissions part of the hospital served as a Royal Naval Auxiliary Hospital. From 1943 to 1944 the Medical Officer in Charge was Surgeon Captain Joseph Roland Brennan RN.

In 1939 the hospital had become County Mental Hospital, Rainhill.

The hospital joined the National Health Service as Rainhill Mental Hospital in 1948. Following the introduction of Care in the Community in the early 1980s, services transferred to Aintree Hospital and Whiston Hospital; the Avon Division closed in 1987 and the Sherdley Division closed in June 1992. The Scott Clinic, a medium secure facility, moved to new facilities on the Sherdley Division site. The facility was demolished stages during the 1990s.

The site was initially acquired by Pilkington Glass for development of a new headquarters but instead Pilkington decided to sell off the site for residential use. The site has been developed and is now known as Reeve Court.

== See also ==
- Lancaster Moor Hospital, the first Lancashire County Asylum
- Prestwich Hospital, the second Lancashire County Asylum
- Whittingham Hospital, the fourth Lancashire County Asylum
- Winwick Hospital, the fifth Lancashire County Asylum
- Calderstones Hospital, the sixth Lancashire County Asylum
- Knowsley Resource and Recovery Centre, Whiston Hospital, a low secure psychiatric unit that was established following the closure of the Sherdley Division at Rainhill. The recovery centre was opened in 1990 as the Sherdley Unit, its namesake being an homage to its predecessor.
- The Windsor Clinic, Aintree Hospital, an acute alcohol detoxification unit that was transferred to Aintree following the closure of Rainhill Hospital.
