= Mersey Care NHS Foundation Trust =

Healthcare trust in England

Coordinates: 53°23′44.6″N 2°58′10.1″W

- Type: Mental health trust
- Chair: Rosie Cooper
- Chief executive: Joe Rafferty
- Website: www.merseycare.nhs.uk

Mersey Care NHS Foundation Trust runs a specialist mental health trust and provides learning disabilities, addiction management, acquired brain injury services and the provision of community nursing and therapies services in Liverpool and Sefton. It provides secure mental health services for the North West of England, the West Midlands and Wales, one of only three NHS organisations in England offering high secure services. It also runs mental health wards at Rathbone Hospital in Wavertree, the Broadoak Unit at Broadgreen Hospital, Mossley Hill Hospital, Windsor House on Upper Parliament Street in Central Liverpool and Heys Court in Garston, Merseyside. The trust gained Foundation trust status in May 2016.

== Development ==
The Trust opened a new hospital, Clock View Hospital in Walton in 2014. It has a psychiatric intensive care unit for people who need intensive short-term treatment and assessment.

It took over Calderstones Partnership NHS Foundation Trust which had a turnover of £42 million per year in 2015. About 130 patients from the Calderstones site had been into alternative services by 2019. It planned to move patients with "exceptionally complex mental health disorders" to a new 40-bed low-security unit in Maghull, but has been unable to secure capital funding.

In 2016 it took over the former Walton Carnegie library in order to set up a new centre for learning, recovery, health and wellbeing.

It acquired the failed Liverpool Community Health NHS Trust in increments over 2017/2018.

The trust was one of the beneficiaries of Boris Johnson's announcement of capital funding for the NHS in August 2019, with an allocation of £33 million for a new 40 bed low secure unit for people with learning disabilities.

In November 2019 it was reported that the trust was to take over North West Boroughs Healthcare NHS Foundation Trust.

It started a COVID Oximetry@Home service in April 2020. This enables monitoring of more than 5000 patients a day in their own homes. The technology, provided by digital health company, Docobo, allows nurses, carers, or patients to record and monitor vital signs such as blood oxygen levels.

== Performance ==
It was named by the Health Service Journal as one of the top hundred NHS trusts to work for in 2015. At that time it had 3,448 full-time equivalent staff and a sickness absence rate of 5.77%. 58% of staff recommend it as a place for treatment and 53% recommended it as a place to work.

493 patients were injured in 2016-17 through use of restraints on psychiatric patients in Merseycare NHS Foundation Trust. This was the second-largest number in England, There were more injuries in Southern Health NHS Foundation Trust. Critics say restraints are potentially traumatic even life-threatening for patients.

== Honorary Freedom of the Borough ==
On 26 January 2023, the Mersey Care NHS Foundation Trust was granted the Honorary Freedom of the Metropolitan Borough of Sefton.
