= North West Boroughs Healthcare NHS Foundation Trust =

NHS mental health trust

- Type: Mental health and community health trust
- Headquarters: Hollins Park Hospital, Winwick
- Region served: North West England
- Chair: Helen Bellairs
- Chief executive: Simon Barber
- Website: www.nwbh.nhs.uk

North West Boroughs Healthcare NHS Foundation Trust was an NHS foundation trust which provided mental health, learning disability and community health services in fifteen boroughs of North West England. The Trust delivered mental health and learning disability services in Halton, Knowsley, St Helens, Warrington and Wigan, as well as community-based physical health services in Halton, Knowsley, St Helens and Sefton. It also provided services to improve outcomes for people with mental vulnerabilities within the criminal justice system across Greater Manchester, working in partnership with Mitie Care and Custody and Cheshire and Greater Manchester Community Rehabilitation Company.

From 1 June 2021, the trust will be dissolved with services in the Merseyside and Cheshire region being transferred to Mersey Care NHS Foundation Trust and services in the Greater Manchester area being transferred to Greater Manchester Mental Health NHS Foundation Trust.

Up until 1 April 2017, North West Boroughs Healthcare NHS Foundation Trust was called 5 Boroughs Partnership NHS Foundation Trust. It changed its name from 5 Boroughs Partnership when it expanded its operations into areas outside of its original five boroughs footprint.

The Trust commissioned the mental health charity Self Help Services to run a specialised overnight crisis centre called The Sanctuary for people experiencing anxiety, panic attacks, depression or suicidal thoughts outside of usual office hours in Leigh in order to relieve pressure on local casualty departments.

The Trust was inspected in July and August 2015 by the Care Quality Commission and rated as "requires improvement", chiefly because of inadequate risk assessments. Following a reinspection in July 2016, the Trust's rating was upgraded to "good" after the Care Quality Commission noted improvements had been made in areas picked up on during their original inspections.

In March 2015 Knowsley Clinical Commissioning Group told the Trust to improve its performance in Improving Access to Psychological Therapies services, where patients had been waiting longer that the 28-day target from referral to first treatment and recovery rates averaged 45%, 5% below the national target.

It joined a consortium with St Helens and Knowsley Teaching Hospitals NHS Trust, and St Helens Rota in 2017 to take over community health services in St Helens.

In March 2017, the Trust opened Atherleigh Park Hospital, its £40m mental health hospital to patients in Wigan and Leigh. Based at the former Leigh East rugby league ground on Atherleigh Way in Leigh, the facility has 48 en-suite bedrooms for vulnerable adults with mental health problems, a 26-bed unit providing short stay intermediate care for patients with dementia and memory conditions, and a 16-bed unit for older people with mental health problems.

In November 2019 it was reported that the trust was to be taken over by Mersey Care NHS Foundation Trust.

== See also ==
- Healthcare in Greater Manchester
- List of NHS trusts
