= Leamington Spa Town Hall =

Municipal building in Leamington Spa, Warwickshire, England

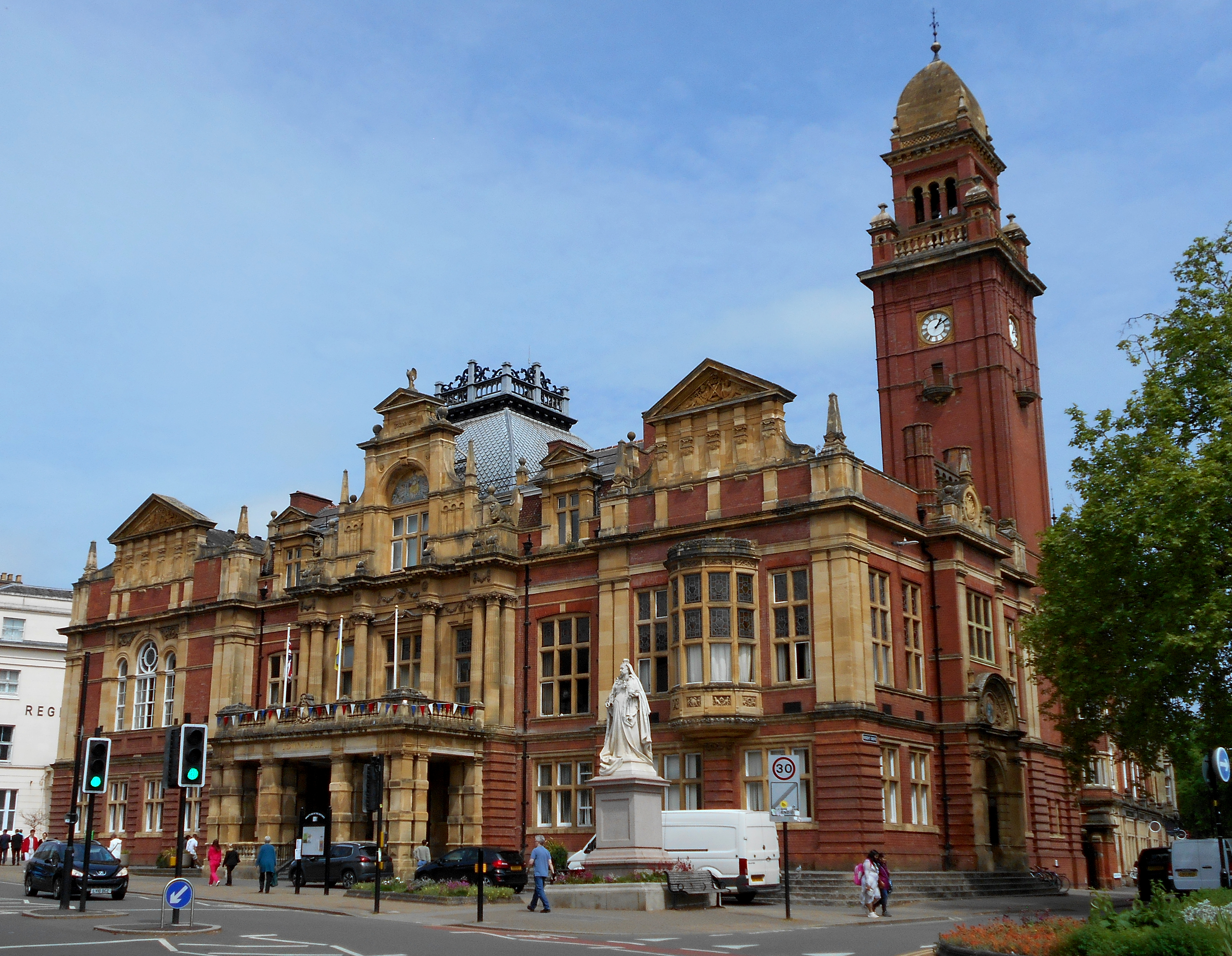
- The Town Hall in May 2023

- Shown in Warwickshire
- 52.2892°N 1.5349°W
- Location: The Parade, Leamington Spa

History
- Built: 1884

Site notes
- Architect: John Cundall
- Architectural style: Tudor style / French baroque style

Listed Building – Grade II
- Designated: 18 August 1980
- Reference no.: 1381441

Leamington Spa Town Hall is a Grade II listed municipal building located in the town of Leamington Spa in Warwickshire, England. It is the meeting place of Royal Leamington Spa Town Council and Warwick District Council.

== History ==
The current hall was commissioned to replace a smaller hall found on High Street which was built in 1830. The former hall was constructed on land owned by The Earl of Aylesford and the Wise family at a cost of £1,900. After the new town hall opened, the old hall was used as a police station and then as a Polish community centre.

Originally the plan was to build the new hall next to the Royal Pump Rooms and the adjacent gardens; however the site eventually chosen was on The Parade next to the Regent Hotel. A house called Denby Villa was purchased for £10,000 and demolished to make room. The foundation stone for the new building was laid by the mayor, Henry Bright, on 17 October 1882. It was designed by architect John Cundall who incorporated elements of both the Tudor style and the French baroque style. The exterior design included a portico on the ground floor surmounted by six Corinthian columns between windows at the first floor level. Construction was undertaken by builder John Fell at a cost of £14,000. It was constructed of Pinkish-red brick with sandstone ashlar dressings with a Welsh slate roof, partly fish-scaled. It was officially opened by the then-mayor, Sidney Flavel, on 18 September 1884. The efforts of Alderman Henry Bright in promoting the development of the new town hall had already been recognised with an obelisk erected in Regent Grove in 1880.

Two of the building's most notable features are its clock tower on the southern end of the building and the statue of Queen Victoria outside it. The statue, designed by Albert Toft, was erected in 1902 and cost £1,500 to create, and was allegedly moved slightly by a German bomb on 14 November 1940 during The Blitz.

After defeating Sugar Ray Robinson to win the world middleweight boxing title championship on 10 July 1951, the locally-born boxer, Randolph Turpin, waved to the crowd from the town hall balcony. The town hall was the headquarters the municipal borough of Leamington but ceased to be local seat of government on the formation of Warwick District in 1974. Since 2002 it has been the headquarters of Royal Leamington Spa Town Council.

The 44 metres (144 ft) tall clock tower, illuminated at night, has been home to a breeding pair of Peregrine Falcons and their chicks every summer since 2017.

== Internal features ==
The building has two main rooms, the council chamber used by Warwick District Council and a 250 capacity assembly room.

== Gallery ==
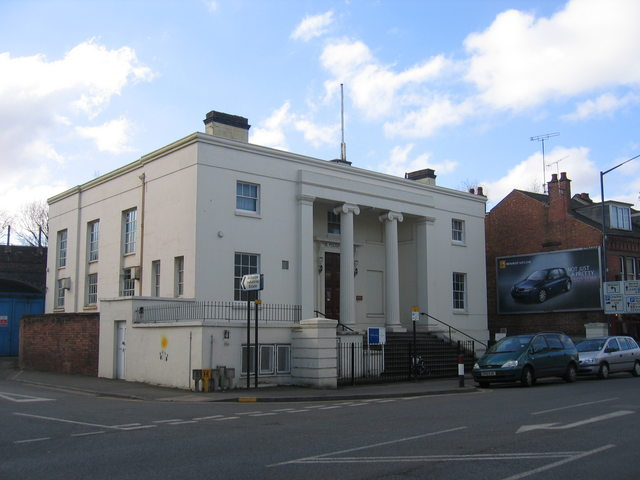
The former town hall of 1830

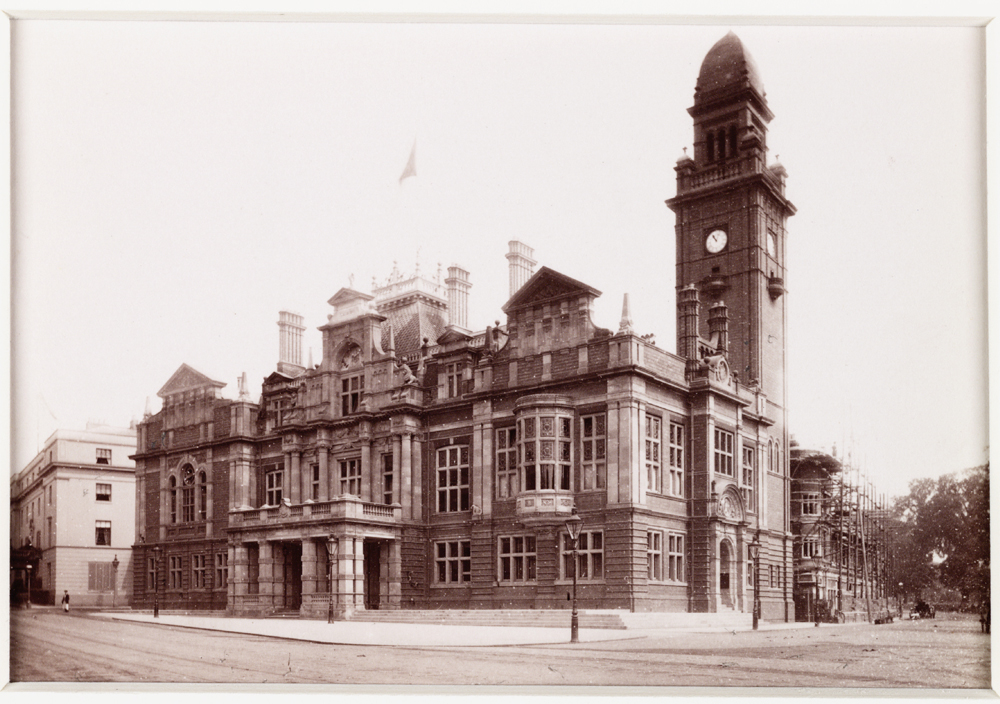
19th century image of the town hall

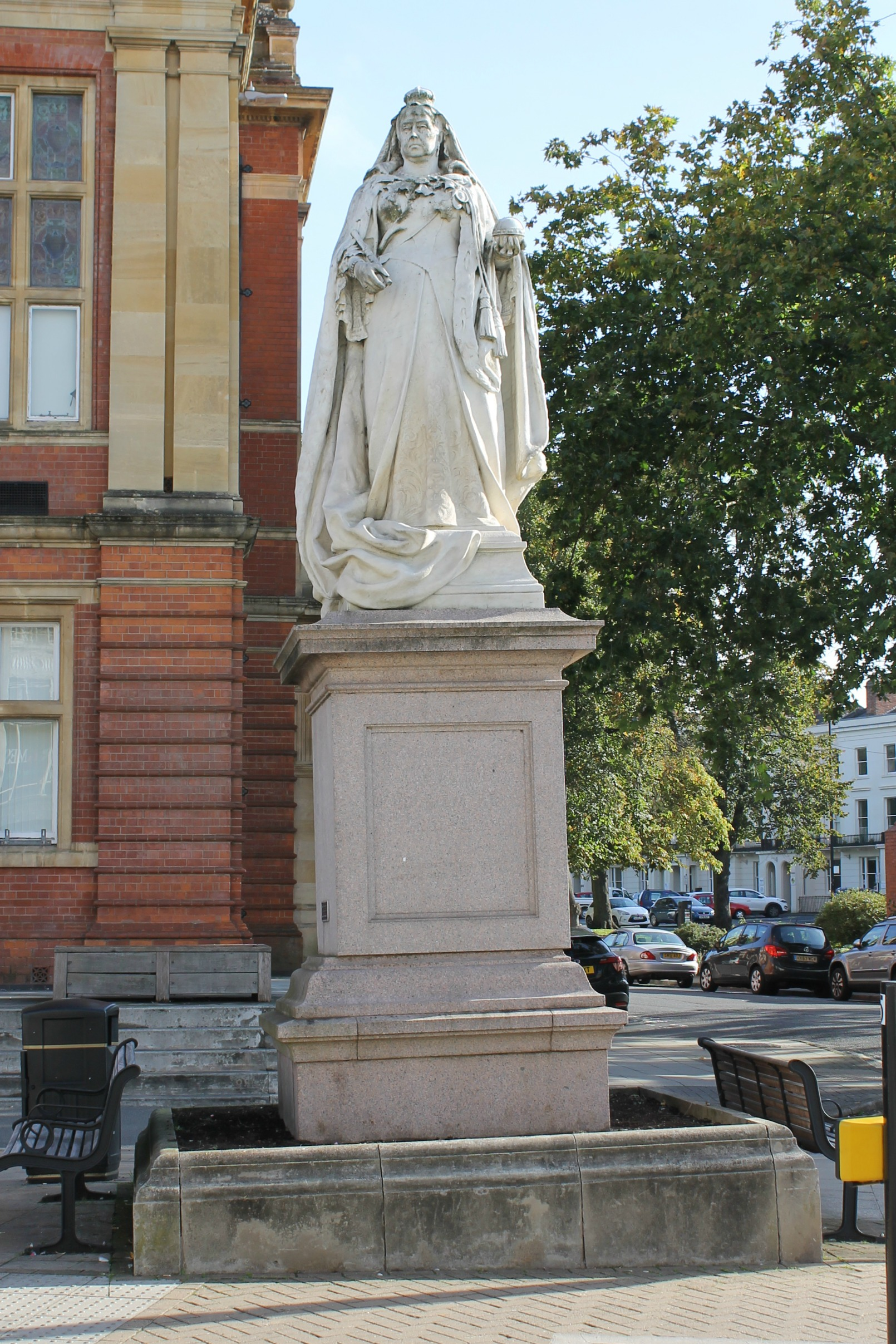
The statue of Queen Victoria outside the Town Hall
