= Leamington Spa =

Spa town in Warwickshire, England

Coordinates: 52°17′31″N 01°32′09″W

Royal Leamington Spa
- Town
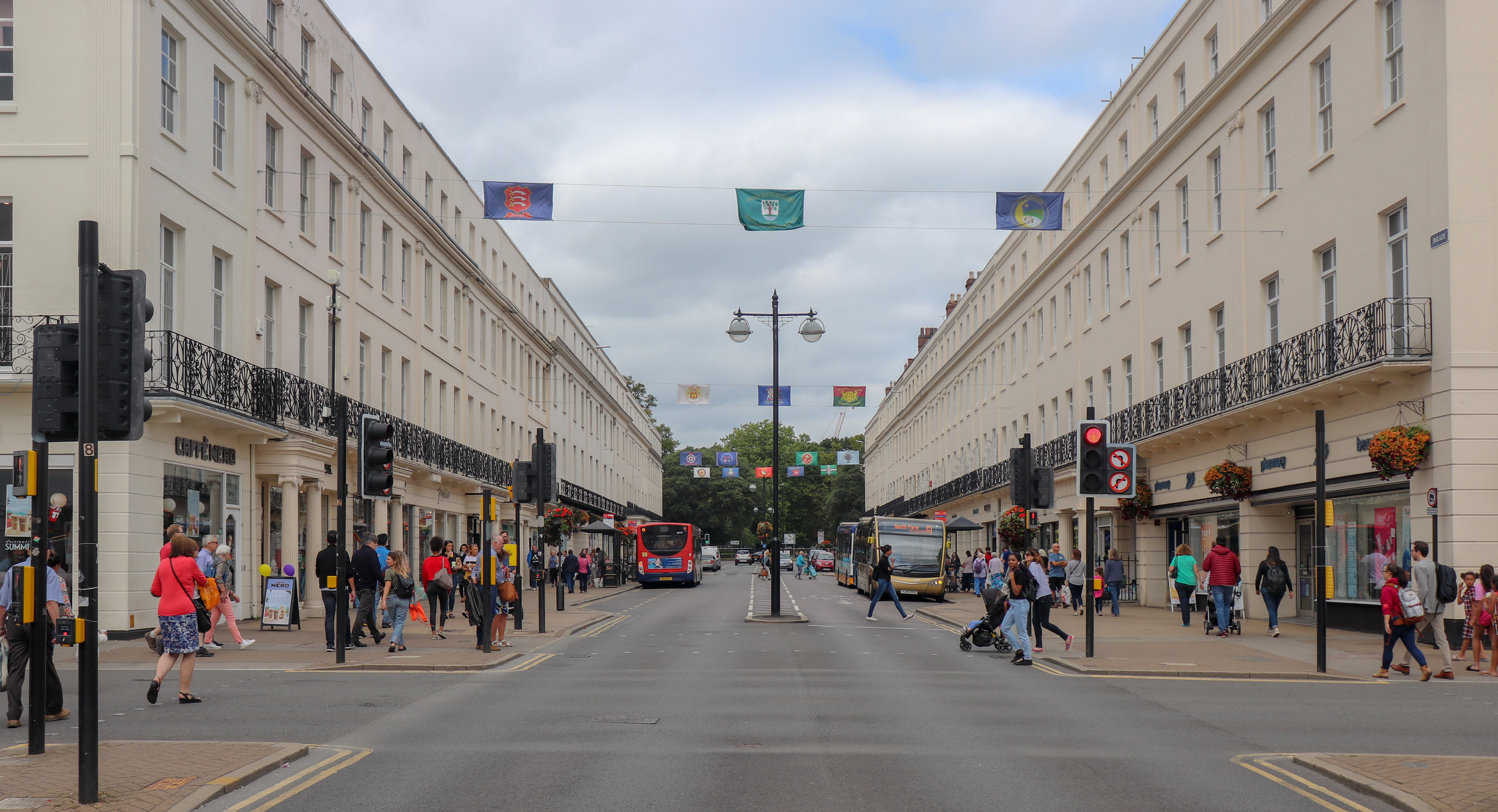
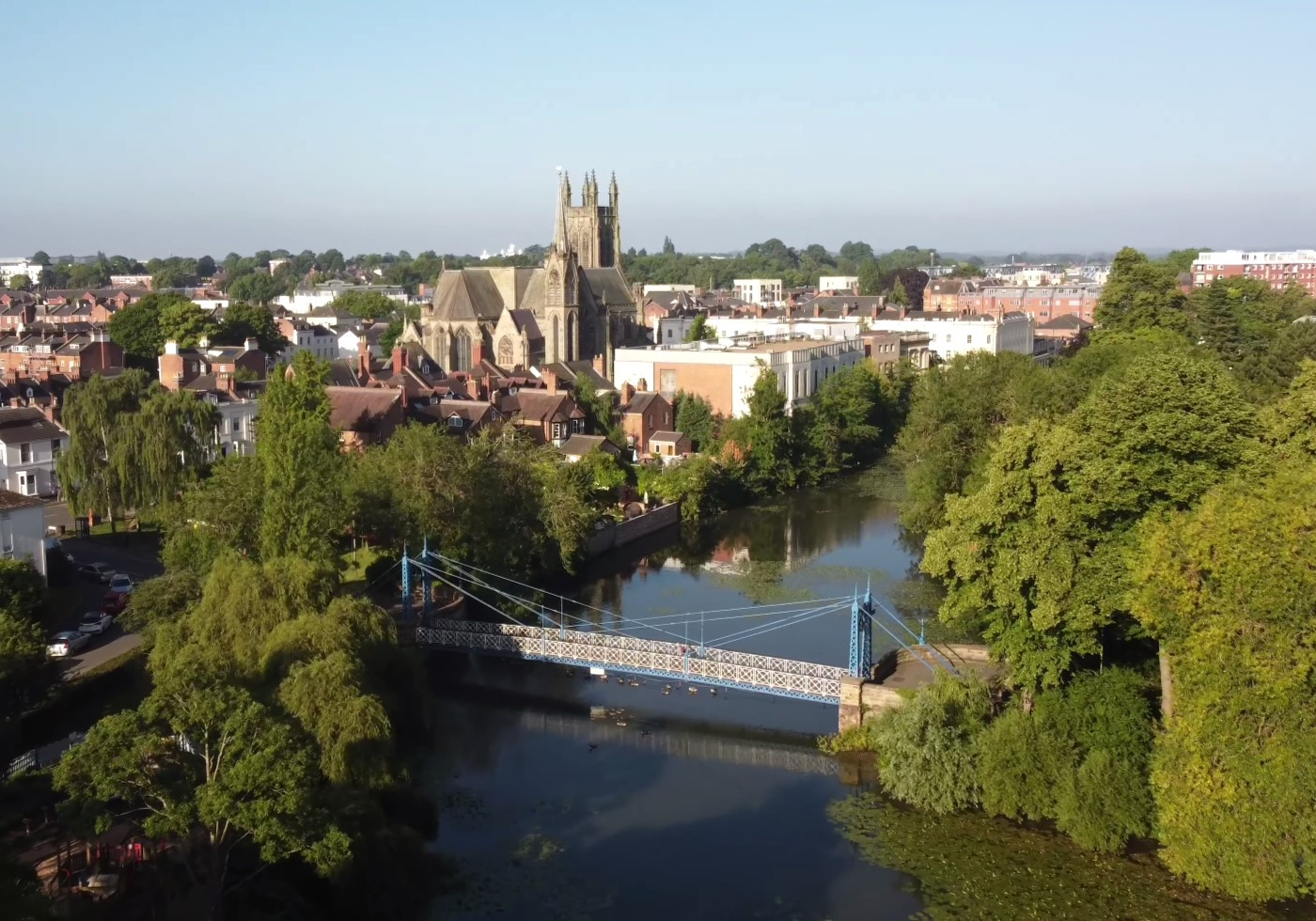
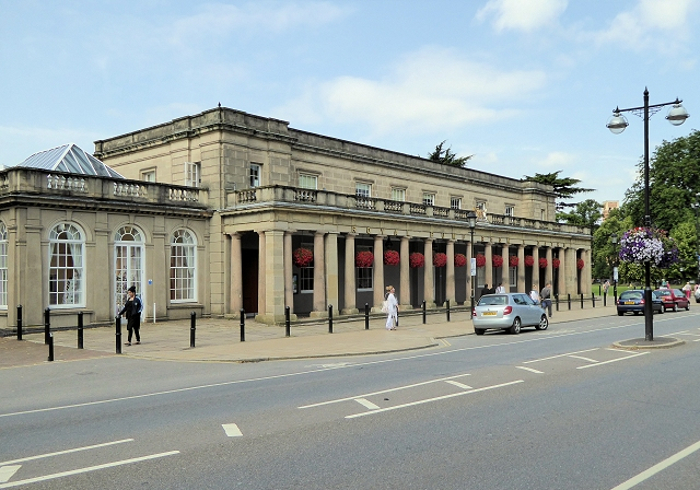
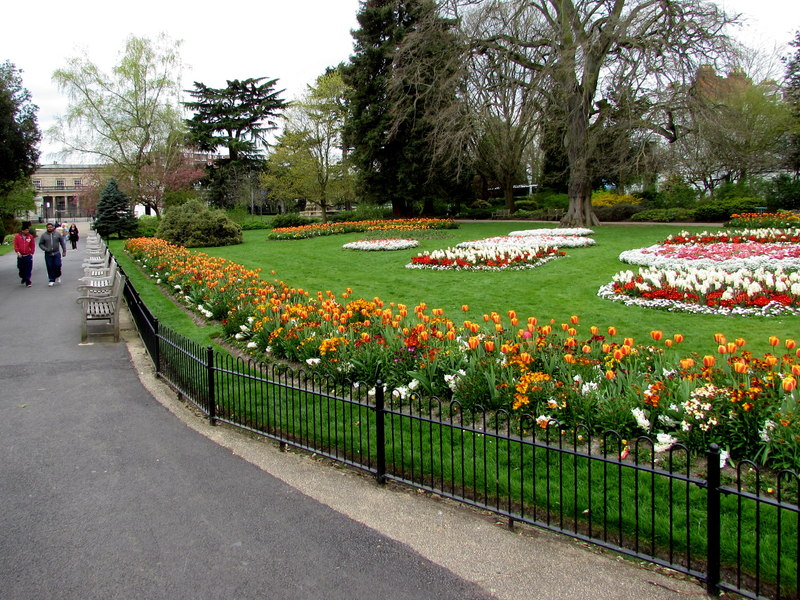
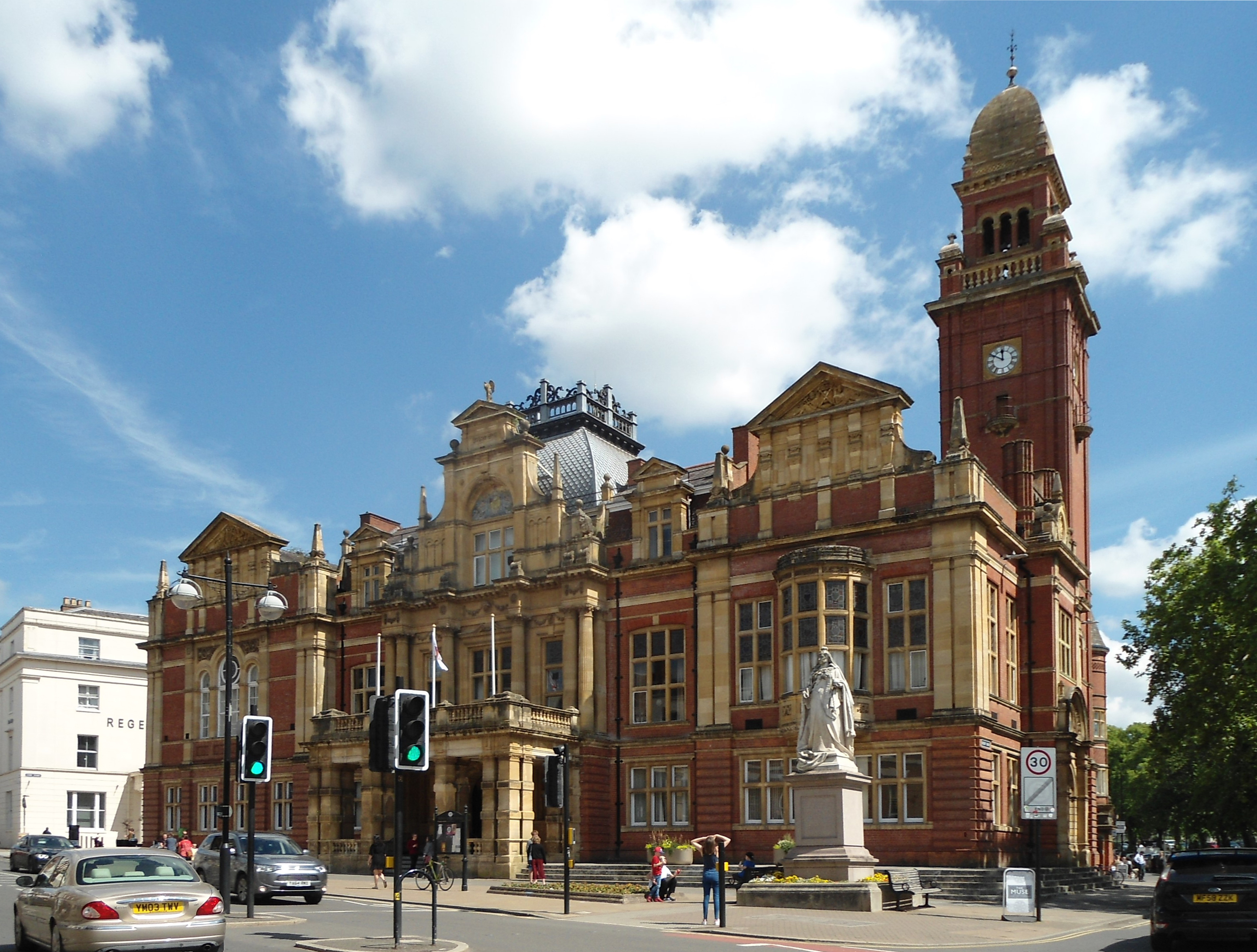
- Parade River Leam Royal Pump Rooms Jephson Gardens Town Hall

- Location within Warwickshire
- Population: 50,923 (2021 census)
- OS grid reference: SP316660
- Civil parish: Royal Leamington Spa
- District: Warwick
- Shire county: Warwickshire
- Region: West Midlands
- Country: England
- Sovereign state: United Kingdom
- Post town: LEAMINGTON SPA
- Postcode district: CV31, CV32, CV33
- Dialling code: 01926
- Police: Warwickshire
- Fire: Warwickshire
- Ambulance: West Midlands
- UK Parliament: Warwick and Leamington

Royal Leamington Spa, commonly known as Leamington Spa or simply Leamington (Note: Even more colloquially, also referred to as Lem or Leam (/ˈlɛm/).) (/ˈlɛmɪŋtən/), is a spa town and civil parish in the Warwick district, in Warwickshire, England. Originally a small village called Leamington Priors, it grew into a spa town in the 18th century following the popularisation of its water which was reputed to have medicinal qualities. In the 19th century, the town experienced one of the most rapid expansions in England. It is named after the River Leam, which flows through the town.

The town contains especially fine examples of Regency architecture, particularly in parts of the Parade, Clarendon Square and Lansdowne Circus. The town also contains several large public parks, such as Jephson Gardens, the Royal Pump Room Gardens and Victoria Park.

Although originally founded around its spa industry, Leamington today has developed into a centre for retail, and digital industries, which has gained it the moniker "silicon spa". In 2023 The Sunday Times named Leamington as the best place to live in the Midlands.

In the 2021 census Leamington had a population of 50,923. Leamington is adjoined with the neighbouring towns of Warwick and Whitnash, and the village of Cubbington; together these form a conurbation known as the "Royal Leamington Spa Built-up area" which in 2011 had a population of 95,172.

Leamington lies around 2.5 miles (4.0 km) east of the county town of Warwick, 9.5 miles (15.3 km) south of Coventry, 22 miles (35 km) southeast of Birmingham, and 81 miles (130 km) northwest of London.

== History ==
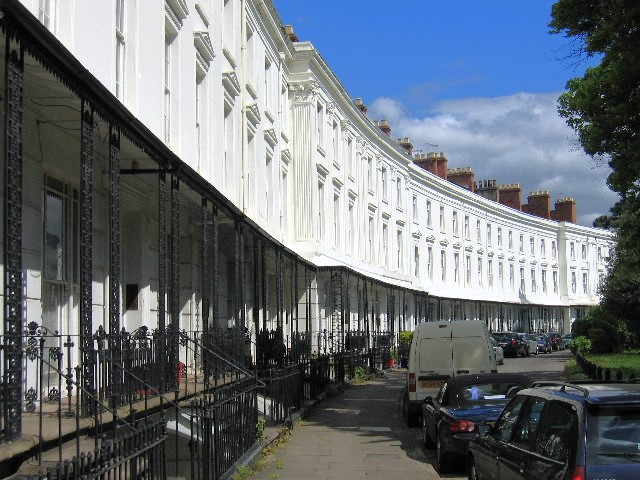
Lansdowne Crescent

Leamington was originally a small village known as Leamington Priors. Its name came from Anglo-Saxon Leman-tūn or Lemen-tūn = "farm on the River Leam". It was first mentioned in the Domesday Book of 1086 as Lamintone. For 400 years, the settlement was under the control of Kenilworth Priory, from which the older suffix derived. Leamington began to develop as a town at the start of the 19th century, due to the rediscovery of spa waters, which had been known in Roman times, and their rediscovery in 1784 by William Abbotts and Benjamin Satchwell led to their commercialisation, with invalids beginning to resort here in 1786. Six of the seven wells were drilled for; only the original spring at the site of the Aylesford Well, adjacent to the Parish Church, occurred naturally.

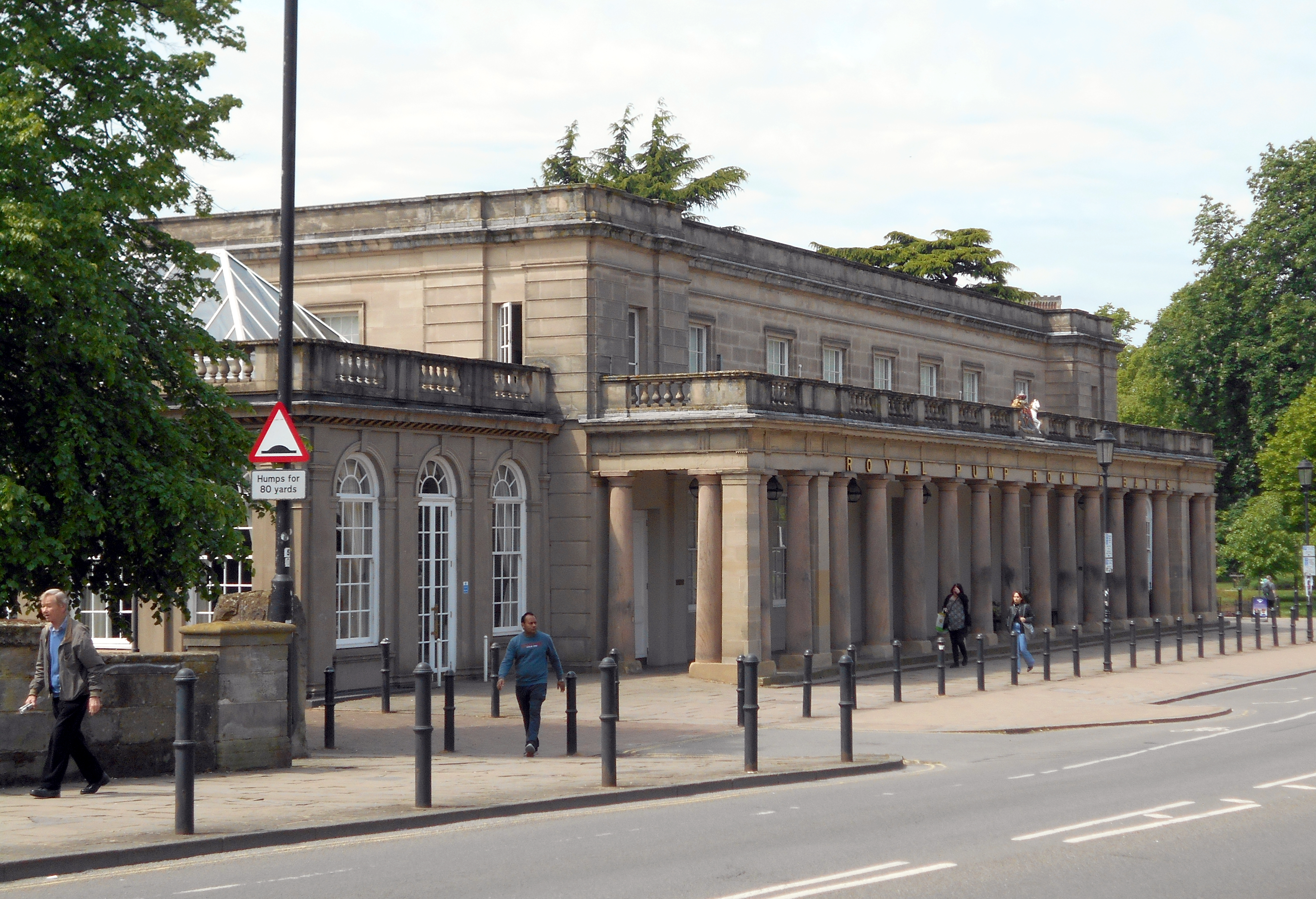
Royal Pump Rooms and Baths

The old village of Leamington Priors was on the southern bank of the River Leam, and early development was based around this. During the early 19th century, developers began concentrating the town's expansion on the land north of the river. This resulted in the Georgian centre of New Town with the Leam flowing between the two. By 1810, the town's existing bath houses could not cope with the increasing visitor numbers, and a syndicate was formed to build a new bath house north of the River Leam. A new saline spring was found on land close to the river, belonging to Bertie Greatheed, a wealthy plantation owner and landowner from Guy's Cliffe, and a member of the syndicate. In 1814, the Royal Pump Rooms and Baths were opened on the site, designed by C.S. Smith, who also designed The Regent Hotel and the Upper Assembly Rooms in the town. Spa water can still be sampled outside the building.

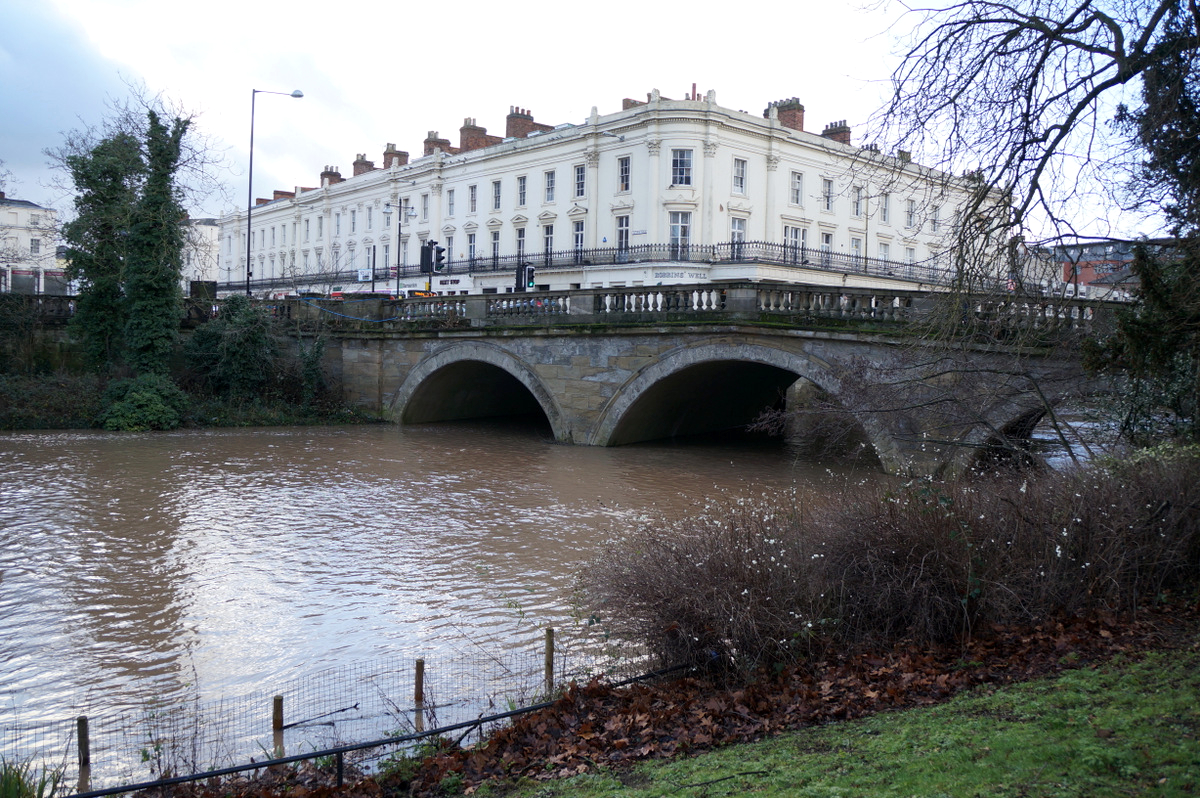
The Victoria Bridge over the Leam

Leamington became a popular spa resort attracting the wealthy and famous, with numerous Georgian townhouses to accommodate visitors. Construction of what is now the Parade began in sections from 1808, the Regent Hotel in 1818, a town hall in 1830. and the Jephson Gardens in 1834. In 1838 Queen Victoria granted the town a 'Royal' prefix, and 'Leamington Priors' was renamed 'Royal Leamington Spa'. Queen Victoria had visited the town as a Princess in 1830 and as Queen in 1858. In 1840 the Victoria Bridge was opened, connecting the old and new towns, replacing an old, narrow, and inconvenient bridge. Nine years earlier, the opening of Portobello Bridge, a three-arch bridge over the River Avon, reconnected the town to neighbouring Warwick—an earlier bridge nearby having been condemned and demolished in 1830.

The growth of Leamington was rapid; at the time of the first national census in 1801, Leamington had a population of just 315, by 1851 this had grown to 15,724, and by 1901, the population had reached 26,888.

The London and North Western Railway opened the first railway line into Leamington; a branch line from Coventry in 1844, followed by a branch to Rugby in 1851. In 1852 the Great Western Railway's main line between Birmingham, Oxford and London opened through Leamington, upon which the first railway station at the current location was opened.

As the popularity of spa resorts declined towards the end of the 19th century, the focus of Leamington's economy shifted towards becoming a popular place of residence for retired people and for members of the middle class, many of whom relocated from Coventry and Birmingham. Its well off residents led to the development of Leamington as a popular place for shopping.

In 1832 the town's main hospital, Warneford Hospital, opened, named after philanthropist Samuel Wilson Warneford. At first a semi-private affair it was taken over by the National Health Service after the Second World War, before succumbing to budget cuts and closing in 1993.

Leamington is closely associated with the founding of lawn tennis. The first tennis club in the world was formed in 1872 by Major Henry Gem and Augurio Pereira who had started playing tennis in the garden of Pereira. It was located just behind the former Manor House Hotel and the modern rules of lawn tennis were drawn up in 1874 in Leamington Tennis Club.

During the Second World War, Leamington was bombed a number of times during The Blitz; although this caused substantial damage it caused relatively few casualties. The town was also home to the Free Czechoslovak Army; a memorial in the Jephson Gardens commemorates the bravery of Czechoslovak parachutists from Warwickshire.

== Geography ==
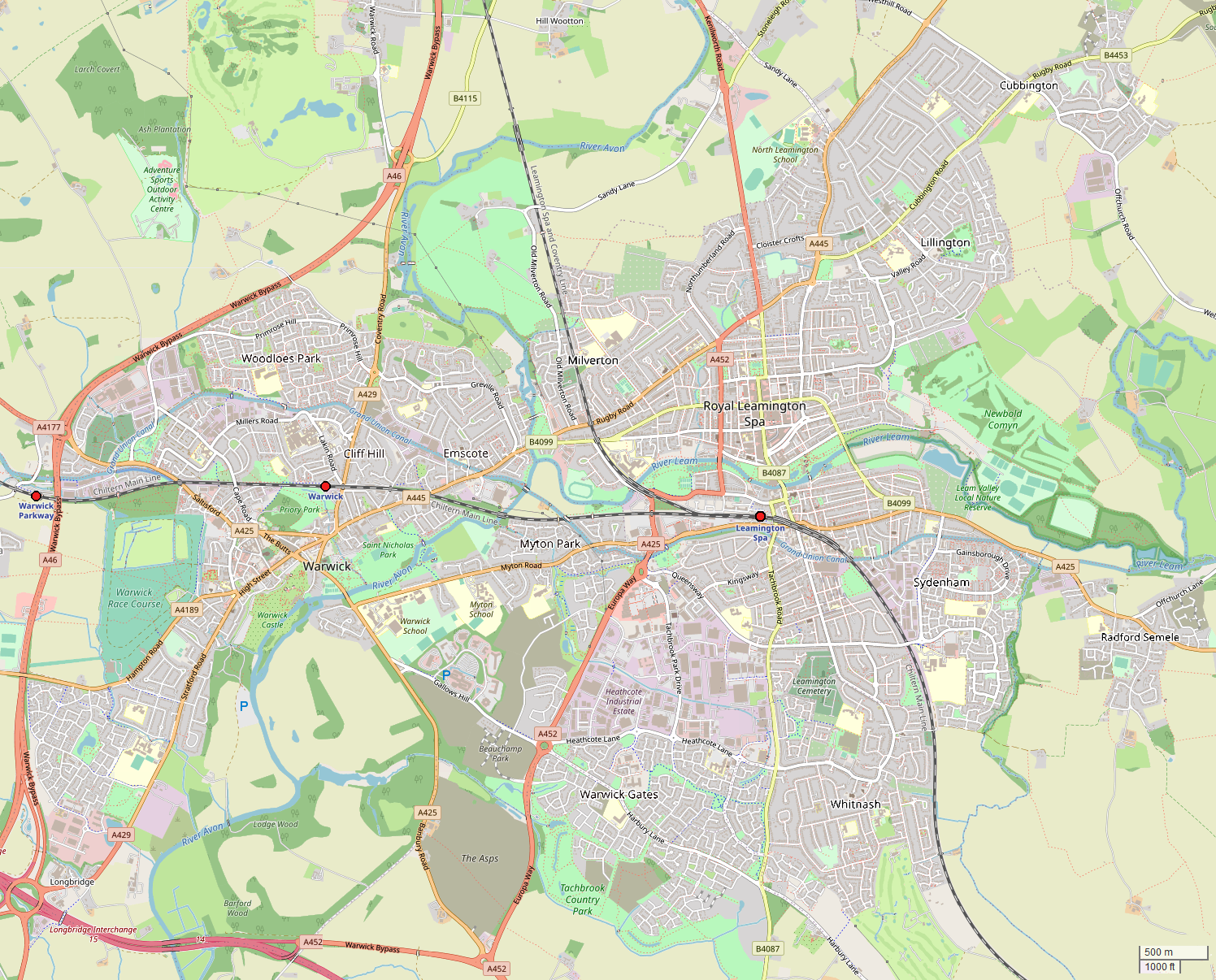
Map of Leamington, Warwick and Whitnash

Leamington is divided by the River Leam running east to west, which is susceptible to flooding in extreme weather, with especially heavy floods in 1998 and 2007.

The Leam is a tributary of the River Avon, which it joins just to the west of Leamington. The ancient town of Warwick lies adjoined directly to the west of Leamington, on the opposite bank of the Avon, with parts of Warwick (Myton and Heathcote) extending to the southwest and south of Leamington. Also contiguous with Leamington, directly to the south, with no natural border, is the smaller town of Whitnash. Whitnash and Warwick are themselves contiguous with new housing developments within the parish of Bishop's Tachbrook. The village of Cubbington is adjoined to the north-east. Just outside the town lie the villages of Old Milverton to the north and Radford Semele 2.5 miles (4 km) to the east.

Leamington has several suburbs; the town has encompassed the former village of Lillington, directly to the north of the town centre. Other suburbs include Milverton to the northwest, Campion Hills to the east, and Sydenham the east. The rapidly expanding Heathcote (or "Warwick Gates") district to the southwest, though often referred to as part of Leamington, actually lies mainly within the boundaries of Warwick, with parts in Whitnash and the parish of Bishop's Tachbrook.

The main road running through the town centre is the Parade (called Lillington Lane until 1860). This shopping street contains high street chains and The Royal Priors shopping mall.

== Governance ==
=== Local government ===
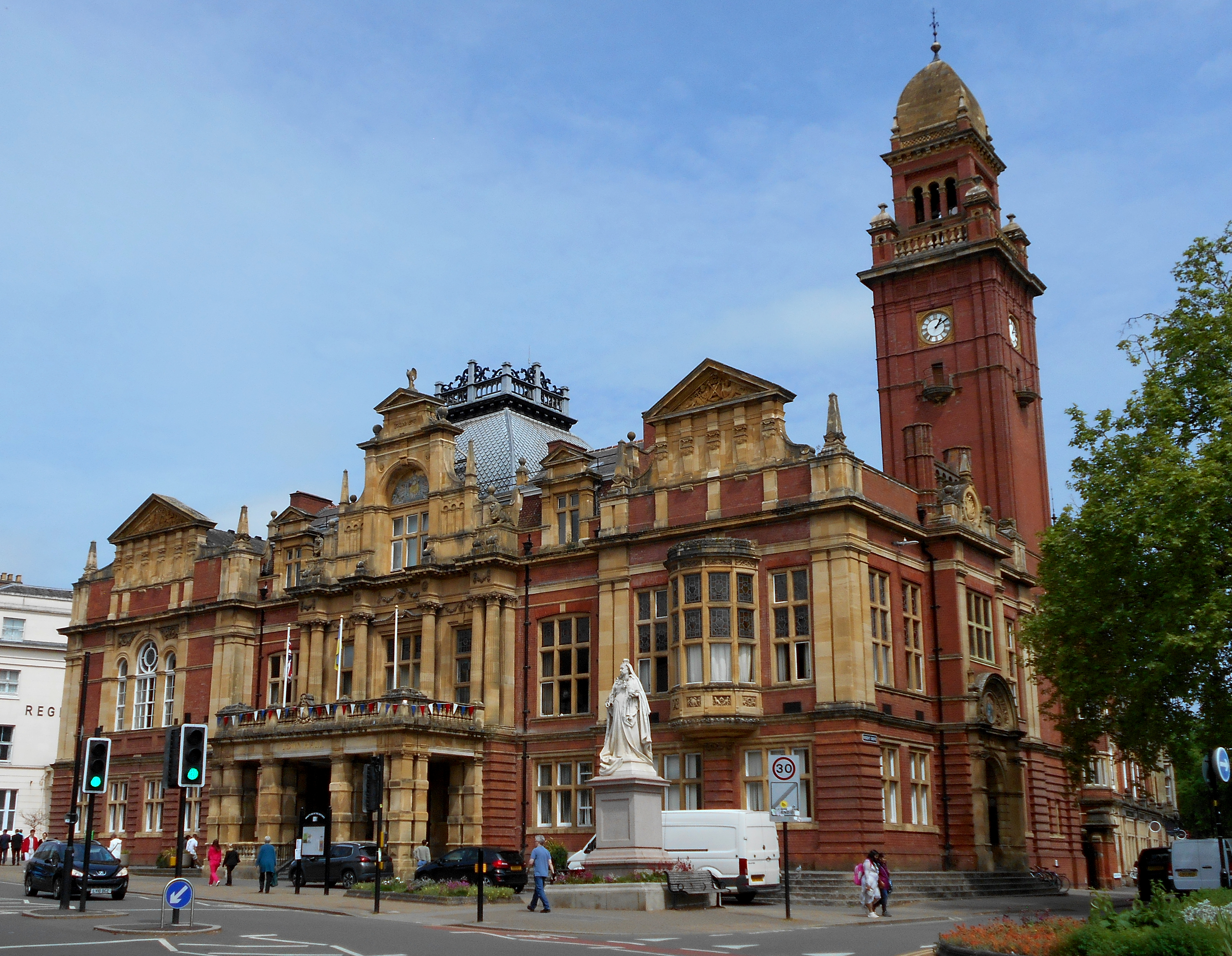
Leamington Spa Town Hall (1884)

Leamington Spa falls under three tiers of local government, county, district and parish: it is a civil parish in the Warwick District, an administrative division of the county of Warwickshire, it thus falls under the jurisdiction of Warwickshire County Council, based in Warwick as the upper-tier authority. Between 1875 and 1974 Leamington was a municipal borough. As part of the 1974 local government reform it was merged with Warwick, Kenilworth and Whitnash, and surrounding rural areas into the Warwick District, which has its offices in Leamington. Since the 2023 elections, Warwick District Council has been run by a coalition of the Labour Party and Green Party, it was previously run by a Conservative-led minority administration.

In 2002 Leamington Spa became a civil parish and gained a new Town (parish) Council, as the most local tier of government.

The Warwick District and county council will be abolished in 2028 as part of the 2027–28 local government reforms, and replaced with a new unitary authority of South Warwickshire, which will comprise the areas of the existing Warwick and Stratford-on-Avon districts.

=== National representation ===
Leamington is part of the parliamentary constituency of Warwick and Leamington. From the 1997 general election until the 2010 general election the constituency was represented in parliament by James Plaskitt of the Labour Party; until then this had been a Conservative safe seat, counting former British prime minister Anthony Eden among its Members of Parliament (MPs). The seat became highly marginal at the 2005 general election, where James Plaskitt won with a majority of just 266 votes. In the 2010 general election the seat returned to the Conservative Party, with Chris White winning the seat by 3,513 votes. White remained the MP until the 2017 general election, when the seat was won by Matt Western of the Labour Party with a narrow majority, he retained his seat at the 2019 general election with his majority reduced from 1,206 to 789, and again at the 2024 election with a greatly increased majority of 12,412.

== Notable buildings ==
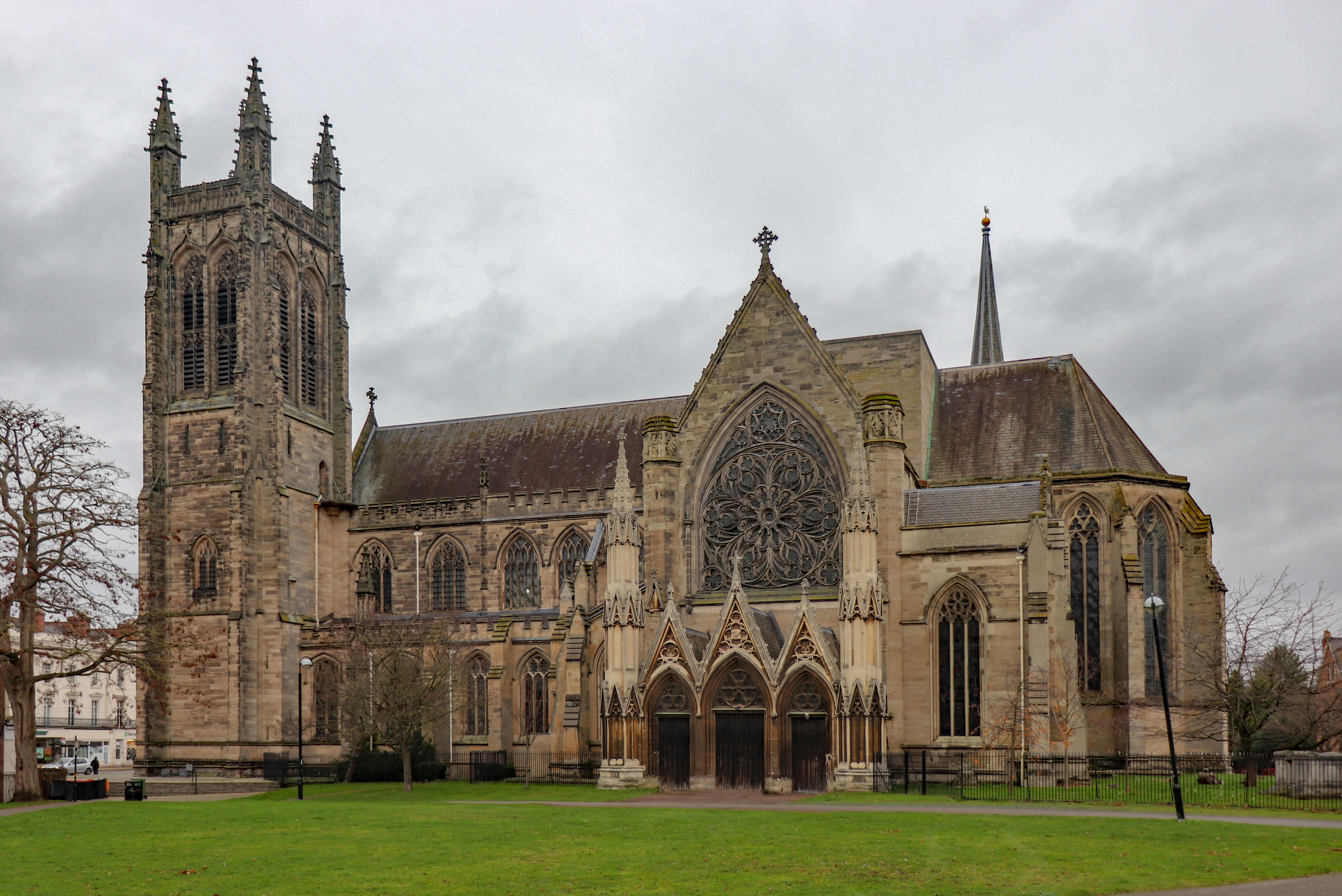
All Saints Church

Buildings in the town include a variety of Georgian and early Victorian architecture, and listed buildings such as the Grade II listed Lansdowne Crescent in neo-classical style, designed by William Thomas between 1835 and 1838.

Amongst the Anglican churches in Leamington is the Gothic parish church All Saints' Church, and St John the Baptist's Church.

St Mark's Church on Rugby Road was designed by George Gilbert Scott Jr. in 1879. It is a Gothic revival design, in red brick with stone dressings. It was endowed by the Carus-Wilson family, in memory of Frances Carus-Wilson (d.1872), wife of Sir Trevor Wheler.

There is a Roman Catholic church, St Peter's Church, two United Reformed churches (one being in Lillington), a small mosque and a Hindu temple. In 2009, the Sikh community built the Gurdwara Sahib Leamington and Warwick in Warwick which also serves Leamington. There are also Christadelphian and Jehovah's Witnesses meeting halls in the town.

Eden Court in Lillington is a residential tower block and one of several tall landmarks. In December 2010, the Warwickshire Justice Centre was completed in Newbold Terrace. As well as a police station, the complex houses a magistrates' court, and the Crown Court, County Court, and other agencies such as the Probation Service and Victim Support. It was officially opened by Queen Elizabeth II on 4 March 2011.

An oak tree just to the northeast of the town centre is marked by a plaque stating that it commemorates the Midland Oak, a tree that grew near the spot and was reputed to be at the centre of England.

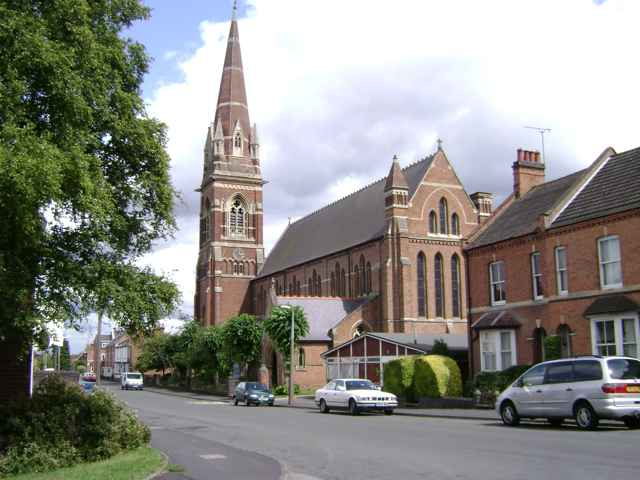
St John the Baptist's Church (Church of England)

== Demographics ==
At the 2021 census, there were 50,923 residents in Leamington, up from 49,662 in the 2011 census, and 45,459 at the 2001 census.

In terms of ethnicity in 2021:

- 80.2% of Leamington residents were White
- 12.6% were Asian
- 3.6% were Mixed
- 1.4% were Black
- 0.3% were Arab
- 1.9% were from another ethnic group.

In terms of religion, 44.6% of Leamington residents said they had no religion, 42.1% identified as Christian, 5.6% were Sikh, 4.4% were Hindu, 1.9% were Muslim, 0.5% were Buddhists, 0.2% were Jewish, and 0.7% were from another religion.

== Economy ==
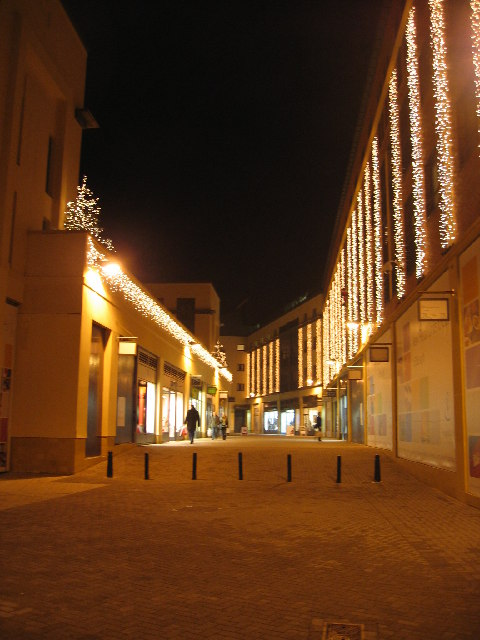
Christmas Lights in Livery Street

=== Tourism ===
The popularity of the town's waters in the 19th century led to the town's initial growth, making tourism Leamington's primary industry in the 19th century. In the 1950s, the Lights of Leamington Festival held in Jephson Gardens drew large crowds.

=== Retail ===
In the town centre there are a variety of shops from high street chains to independent retailers, plus an indoor shopping centre, The Royal Priors. There is an out of town retail park called the Leamington Shopping Park (formerly The Shires Retail Park), even though it sits within the boundaries of Warwick. It opened in 1989.

=== Manufacturing ===
Tourism was initially driven by the spring waters. The arrival of the Warwick and Napton Canal (later amalgamated into the Grand Union Canal) officially opened in 1799 as the primary means of cargo transport and led to growth in other industries until rail gradually took over in the mid 19th century, The canal supplied coal to the gasworks on Tachbrook Road, providing gas to light the town from 1835. Pig iron, coke and limestone were delivered by canal, allowing a number of foundries to be established in Leamington, specialising in cast iron stoves. Today the Eagle Foundry, dating from at least 1851, continues to manufacture Rangemaster Aga stoves. The Imperial Foundry, dating from around 1925, was subsequently taken over by Ford, casting engine blocks until its closure in 2008.

The prominent car parts manufacturer Automotive Products based in the south of the town grew from a small garage to occupy a large site. Throughout the 20th century, while tourism took a downturn, Automotive Products expanded and built a factory in the South of the town in 1928 that is still operative in 2009, although on a much smaller scale. Karobes Limited, with its headquarters in Queensway, was one of Britain's major suppliers of accessories for cars between World War II and the 1970s.

Commercial parks for service providers and light industry and offices are primarily located to the south of the town: Althorpe Street Industrial Estate, Queensway Trading Estate, Shires Gate Trading Estate and Sydenham Industrial Estate.

In June 2014, Detroit Electric announced that they would be building their SP.01 all-electric roadster in Leamington Spa.

=== Digital media and the video game industry ===
Leamington Spa and the surrounding area, known as Silicon Spa, is a significant global centre for the video game industry, with a higher than average proportion of digital media companies involved in games development, digital design and publishing, and over a thousand employed directly in game development. Companies based in or around the town include Third Kind Games, Super Spline Studios, Lab42, Sumo Leamington, Caperfly, Widgit Software, DNA Interactive, Fish in a Bottle, Unit 2, Electric Square, Full Fat, Kwalee, Pixel Toys, Playground Games, Red Chain Games, Stickman Studios, Supersonic Software and Midoki. Codemasters are based at Southam near Leamington and were the initial impetus behind the cluster, providing many of the staff for the companies in Leamington. In 2013, Sega's mobile platform studio Hardlight Studio set up in Leamington, and Exient opened a satellite studio. Former companies were Blitz Games Studios, FreeStyleGames, Bigbig Studios, Ubisoft Leamington, and Titus Software UK Limited.

=== Healthcare ===
Leamington was served by Warneford Hospital until 1993. Afterwards services transferred to either Warwick Hospital or Walsgrave Hospital (now University Hospital Coventry). Local hospitals include the Leamington Spa Hospital and the Warwickshire Nuffield Hospital. On 13 July 2021 a coronavirus "mega lab" was opened in the town. Named after English chemist Rosalind Franklin, the laboratory is intended to be capable of processing hundreds of thousands of samples a day, making it the largest of its kind in the UK. It is expected to create up to 1,500 jobs.

== Education ==
There are a number of schools either located within Leamington, or which include Leamington in their priority (catchment) area. Those within Leamington include the state secondary schools of North Leamington School, Campion School, Trinity Catholic School, and the independent schools of Arnold Lodge School, a co-educational school for pupils aged 3 to 18, and The Kingsley School, a school for girls. Myton School in Warwick, although located just outside Leamington, includes parts of Leamington as being within its priority area.

As well as these schools, Leamington children can attend Stratford-upon-Avon Grammar School for Girls, a state run selective school, Warwick School, an independent school for boys, the King's High School for Girls, Warwick's twin school and Princethorpe College, a mixed independent school in the nearby village of Princethorpe.

Leamington is the location of the first of Warwickshire College's six sites, and additionally another site is located just outside the town. The closest higher education institutions are the University of Warwick, in southwestern Coventry, and Coventry University.

Leamington is also home to two national educational charities – The Smallpeice Trust and The Arkwright Scholarships Trust. They specialise in making young people aware of how STEM fields studied in school can lead to fulfilling and exciting careers in science and engineering sectors of industry.

== Culture ==
=== Leamington Spa Art Gallery & Museum ===
Leamington Spa Art Gallery & Museum is located in the Royal Pump Rooms, on the Parade. It holds a collection of over 12,000 objects, including fine and decorative arts, as well as items relating to local and social history. It provides exhibitions in the visual arts and about the history of the town, supported by workshops, talks and other events.

=== Community centres ===
There are several local community centres.

=== Peace Festival ===
Since 1978, the annual free festival and celebration of alternative culture called the Peace Festival has been held in the Pump Room Gardens. The event was cancelled due to the COVID-19 pandemic and did not run for a few years afterwards, but had returned by 2026.

=== Music ===
Live music is provided by local bands in a variety of venues. In December 2005 the band Nizlopi from Leamington, reached Number 1 in the UK Singles Chart with "JCB". The Woodbine Street Recording Studios has been used by several well-known music acts such as Paul Weller, Ocean Colour Scene, Felt, The Specials, and local band The Shapes, whose single "Batman in the Launderette" charted first in 1979. Classical music concerts are organised throughout the year in the Leamington and Warwick area, including the International String Quartet series at the Royal Pump Rooms. The Assembly, is a 1,000 capacity music venue attracting national and international artists, and was awarded 'Live Music Venue of the Year' at the 2010 Music Week Awards. and the Leamington Spa Competitive Festival for Music Dance and Drama is staged annually.

=== Theatre and cinema ===
Two theatres are located in Leamington: the Spa Centre and the amateur The Loft, with outdoor summer productions in Jephson Gardens. Leamington also has two cinemas: the Spa Centre and a multiplex.

=== Sport and leisure ===
There are a number of sports clubs and leisure facilities in Leamington Spa, including the oldest purpose built Real Tennis court in the world at Leamington Tennis Court Club, the football club Leamington F.C., a disc golf course Quarry Park, a leisure centre including swimming pool Newbold Comyn Leisure Centre, rugby grounds Leamington Rugby Union Football Club, Leamington Rugby Club – Youth Section and Old Leamingtonians Rugby Football Club, Leamington Cricket, Khalsa Leamington Hockey Club, Leamington Cycling club, Leamington Athletics club, Spa Striders Running Club, Royal Leamington Spa Canoe Club, Leamington Chess Club, formed in 1851, and municipal tennis courts. The Royal Leamington Spa Bowling Club in Victoria Park hosts the annual National Lawn Bowls Championships.

==== Parks and gardens ====
The town has several parks and gardens, including the Jephson Gardens, close to the Royal Pump Rooms and next to the River Leam. These were seriously damaged in the floods of 1998, but have been restored and improved with funding from the National Lottery. The other side of the River Leam, on Priory Terrace features the "Elephant Walk" 19th-century slipway down to the river located near the suspension bridge in Jephson Gardens. It was specifically constructed so that circus elephants in winter quarters in Leamington could be watered. Other parks are the Mill Gardens on the opposite bank of the river to Jephson Gardens, Victoria Park, the Royal Pump Room Gardens, The Dell and Newbold Comyn which includes the nature reserves Welches Meadow and Leam Valley.

The Lights of Leamington Festival was an annual lights festival held in Jephson Gardens from 1951 to 1961.

=== Local media ===
The Leamington Courier was the first newspaper to be published in Leamington and was founded in 1828, and is available to buy locally in print. The launch of the WarwickshireWorld website in September 2021 brought together content online from various Warwickshire local titles, including the Courier. The Leamington Observer is another local newspaper.

=== Popular culture ===
The cover of the Ocean Colour Scene album Moseley Shoals features the Jephson Memorial in Jephson Gardens. The town has been used as a filming location in various television series. BBC's Upstairs Downstairs used the Georgian terrace at Clarendon Square as a main exterior location. ITV's Sherlock Holmes episode 'The Last Vampyre' featured Guy's Cliffe House, which was severely damaged in a fire during production. Leamington also appeared as a location in ChuckleVision, and often appeared in the 1990s sitcom Keeping Up Appearances.

== Transport ==
=== Road ===
The town is 3 miles (5 km) away from the M40 motorway, which links it to Birmingham and London. It is also served by the A46, which connects it to Coventry and Stratford-upon-Avon.

=== Railway ===
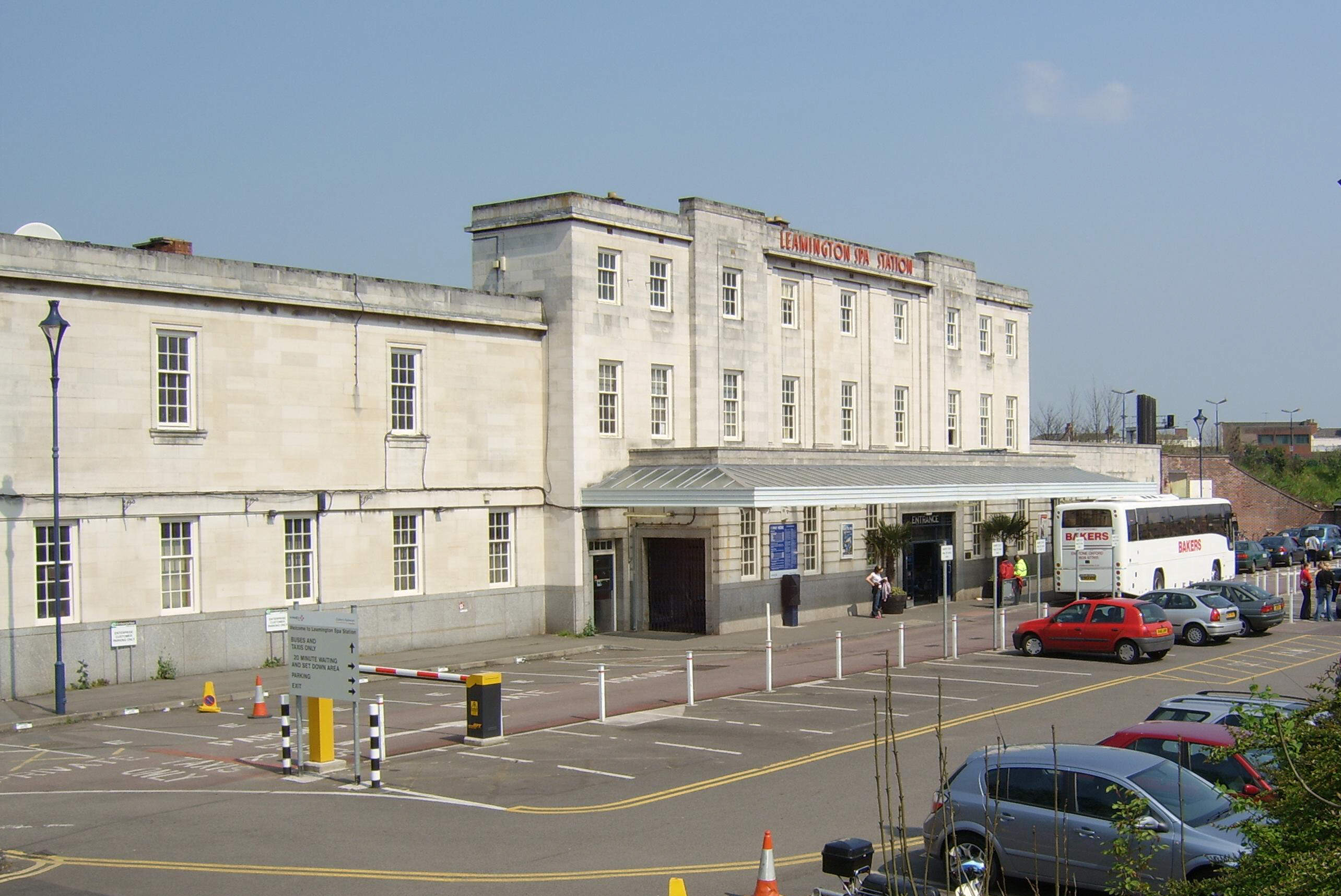
Leamington Spa railway station

Leamington Spa railway station is served by three train operating companies:

- Chiltern Railways operates frequent inter-city services on the Chiltern Main Line, which links London Marylebone, Birmingham Snow Hill and onwards to Stourbridge at peak times. Local services run to Stratford-upon-Avon, via Warwick.
- West Midlands Trains operates local services to Birmingham and onwards to Worcester Shrub Hill at peak hours. The Elephant & Bear Line connecting Leamington Spa to Coventry is used by local hourly services to Nuneaton, via Kenilworth.
- CrossCountry provides services to Banbury, Oxford, Reading and Bournemouth to the south; Coventry, Birmingham New Street, Manchester Piccadilly and Newcastle can be reached to the north.

=== Buses ===
Local bus services are operated primarily by Stagecoach Midlands; destinations include Warwick, Banbury, Stratford-upon-Avon and Rugby. West Midlands Bus operates a high-frequency service to Kenilworth, the University of Warwick and Coventry.

=== Air ===
Leamington's nearest international passenger airport is Birmingham Airport.

Coventry Airport is a nearby general aviation airport and former tourist charter hub. It currently (end of 2025) has no scheduled passenger services and indeed is scheduled to close permanently in June 2026.

=== Waterways ===
The Grand Union Canal is used for recreation. It crosses the river Avon between Leamington and Warwick, and then passes the town to the south, parallel to the River Leam to the north. The rivers are not used for transportation, but there are proposals to render them navigable.

=== Cycleways ===
There are national and local cycleways into and around Leamington including a cycle path to Rugby following the former railway line part of National cycle route 41.

=== Trams ===
Between 1881 and 1930, Leamington & Warwick Tramways & Omnibus Company operated trams between the two towns.

== Religion ==
Leamington Spa has a diverse religious landscape, reflecting the town's history and its role as a spa town attracting people from various backgrounds. The most prominent religion is Christianity, with several historic churches and modern congregations.

=== Christianity ===
- Anglican Church: The Church of England has a strong presence in Leamington Spa, with several parish churches. Some notable examples include All Saints' Church, St Mark's Church, and St Peter's Church.
- Catholic Church: The Roman Catholic Church has a number of parishes in the town, including St Joseph's Church and St Mary's Church.
- Other Christian Denominations: Leamington Spa also hosts congregations of various Protestant denominations, such as Baptists, Methodists, United Reformed Church, and Christadelphians.

=== Other Religions ===
- Islam: The town has a small Muslim community, and there is a mosque serving their needs.
- Hinduism: There is a Hindu temple in Leamington Spa, catering to the local Hindu population.
- Sikhism: The Gurdwara Sahib Leamington and Warwick, located in Warwick, serves the Sikh community in the area, including Leamington Spa.

== Notable residents ==
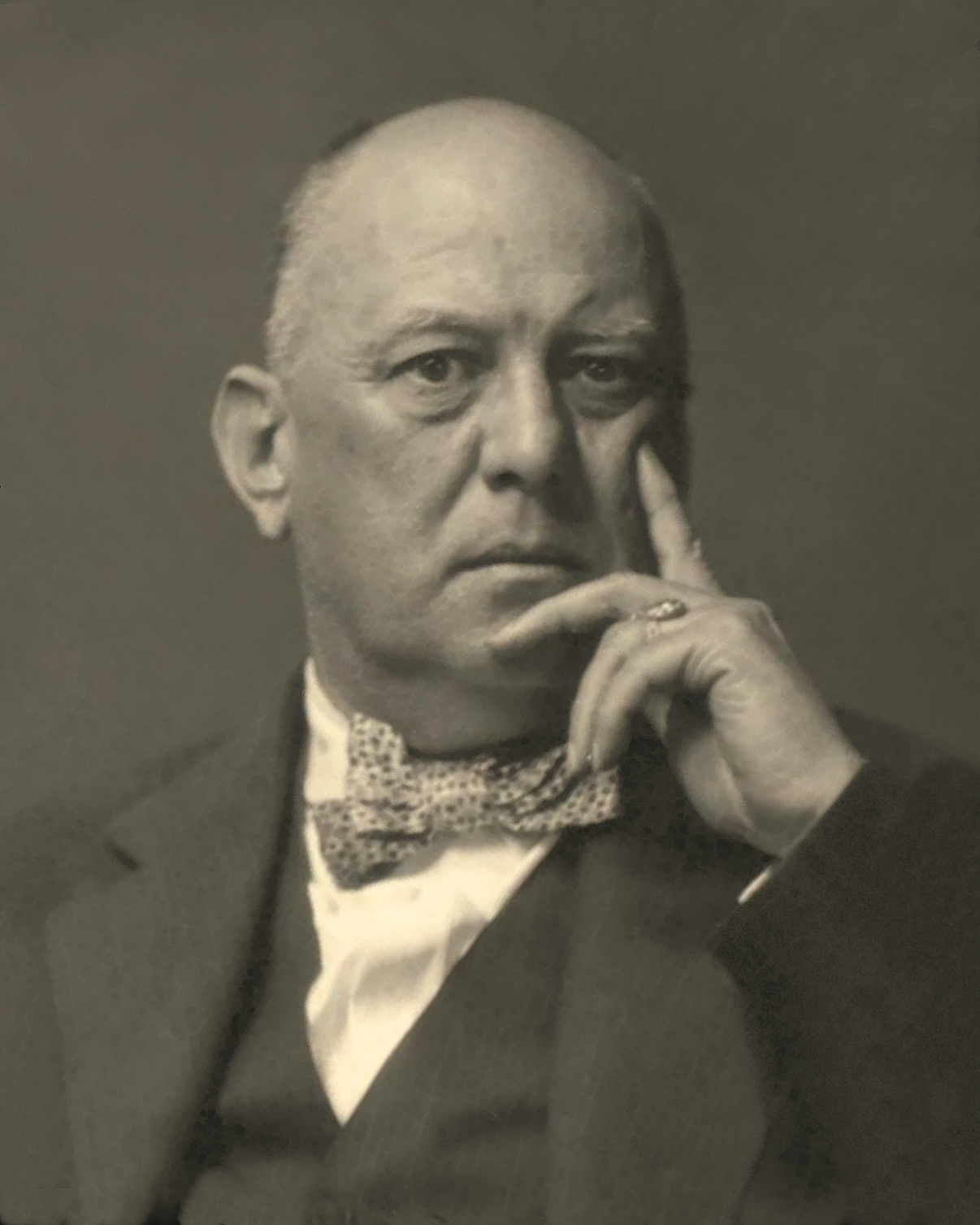
Aleister Crowley, born in Leamington

Famous people who were born in Leamington include the following:

- Occultist Aleister Crowley (1875–1947)
- Professional footballer and YouTuber Ben Foster.
- Artist Terry Frost (1915–2003)
- Plant biochemist Robin Hill FRS (1899–1991)
- Actor, broadcaster and writer Norman Painting (1924–2009)
- Pathologist Bernard Spilsbury (1877–1947),
- World champion boxer Randolph Turpin (1928–1966),
- Actor and casting director Leon Vitali (1948–2022)

Famous people to live or have lived in Leamington include the following:

- Louis-Napoléon Bonaparte; who became the President of France and then Emperor Napoleon III, who lived in Leamington whilst in exile between 1838 and 1839,
- Television presenter Anne Diamond
- Grime artist Stormzy lived in Leamington while studying for an apprenticeship.
- Comedian Russell Howard.
- Inventor of the jet engine, Frank Whittle (1907–1996) who lived in Leamington as a child,

== Twin towns – sister cities ==
Royal Leamington Spa is twinned with:

- Sceaux, France (since 1969)
- Brühl, North Rhine-Westphalia, Germany (since 1973)
- Heemstede, Netherlands (since 1987)

=== Friendship ===
Royal Leamington Spa has friendship agreements with:

- Leamington, Canada – which was named after Royal Leamington Spa
- Bo, Sierra Leone

== Climate ==
Leamington Spa experiences the oceanic climate which covers most of the United Kingdom.

Climate data for Leamington Spa
Month	Jan	Feb	Mar	Apr	May	Jun	Jul	Aug	Sep	Oct	Nov	Dec	Year
Mean daily maximum °C (°F)	6.0 (42.8)	6.2 (43.2)	8.9 (48.0)	11.9 (53.4)	15.3 (59.5)	18.8 (65.8)	20.6 (69.1)	20.1 (68.2)	17.6 (63.7)	13.8 (56.8)	9.2 (48.6)	7.1 (44.8)	12.9 (55.3)
Mean daily minimum °C (°F)	0.3 (32.5)	0.1 (32.2)	1.5 (34.7)	3.3 (37.9)	6.0 (42.8)	9.2 (48.6)	11.1 (52.0)	10.8 (51.4)	8.8 (47.8)	6.2 (43.2)	2.9 (37.2)	1.3 (34.3)	5.1 (41.2)
Average precipitation mm (inches)	53 (2.1)	48 (1.9)	51 (2.0)	48 (1.9)	56 (2.2)	56 (2.2)	46 (1.8)	66 (2.6)	53 (2.1)	53 (2.1)	58 (2.3)	66 (2.6)	660 (25.9)

== See also ==
- List of spa towns in the United Kingdom
- Listed buildings in Warwickshire
- List of places with royal styles in the United Kingdom
