= St Mark's Church, Leamington Spa =

Coordinates: 52°17′38.1″N 01°32′45.3″W

St Mark’s Church, Leamington Spa
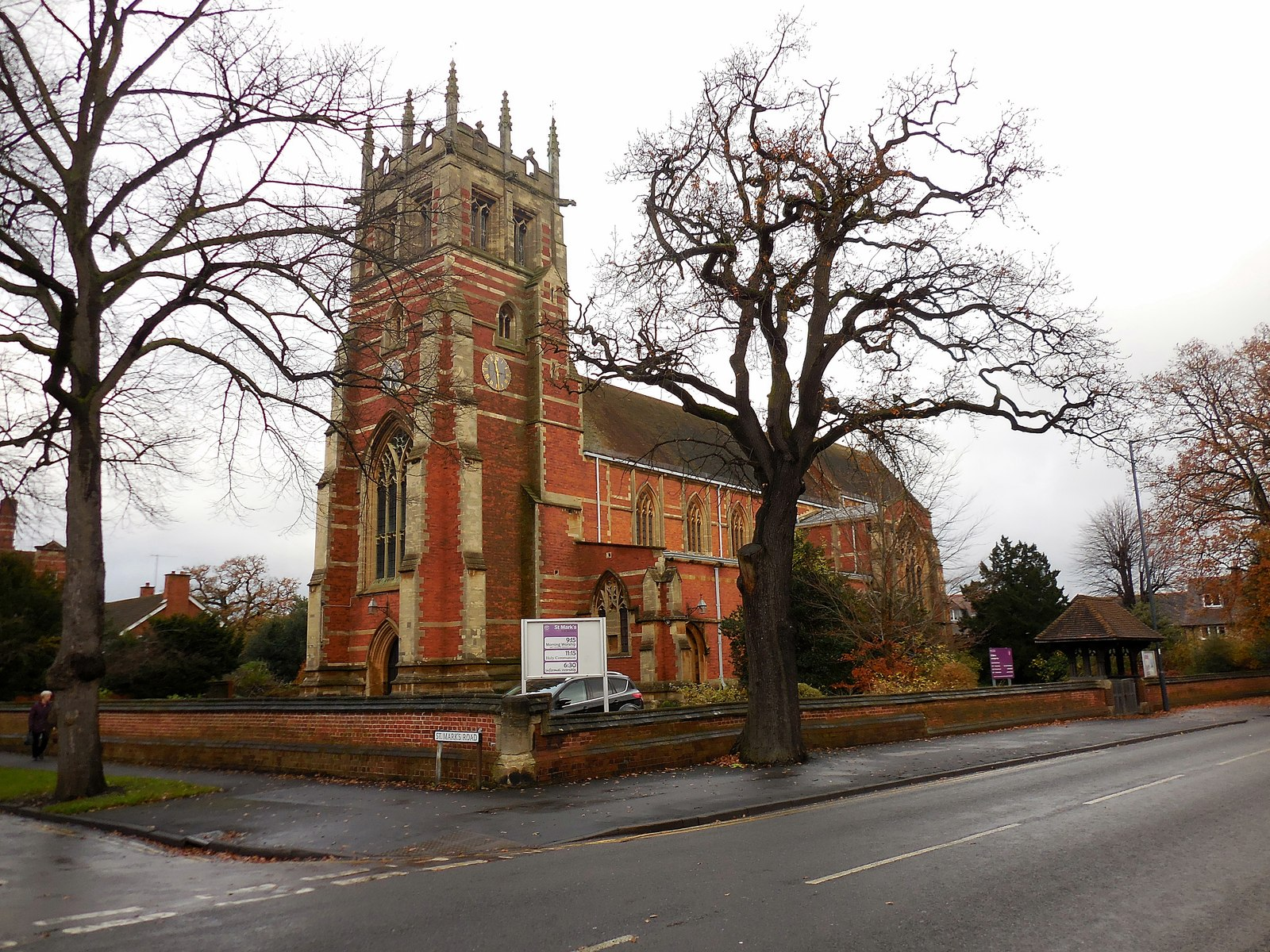
- St. Mark’s Church, Leamington Spa
- St Mark’s Church, Leamington Spa
- OS grid reference: SP 31072 66310
- Denomination: Church of England
- Website: st-marks.net

History
- Dedication: St Mark

Administration
- Province: Canterbury
- Diocese: Coventry
- Parish: New Milverton

Clergy
- Vicar: Tim Broadbent

Listed Building – Grade II*
- Official name: Church of St Mark
- Designated: 19 November 1953
- Reference no.: 1381515

Listed Building – Grade II
- Official name: Churchyard Wall and Lychgate to Church of St Mark
- Designated: 30 November 1999
- Reference no.: 1381516

St Mark's Church is an evangelical Anglican church located in Leamington Spa, England. It is a Gothic Revival church built in 1879, and is the parish church for the parish of New Milverton.

== History ==
St Mark's was built in the memory of Dame Francis Wheeler who left behind £9,000 towards building a new church at her death. The church was built on the site of an apple orchard given by the granddaughter of Bertie Greatheed.

The church was designed by George Gilbert Scott Jr., who produced three designs for the building beginning in 1873 based on his designs for St Agnes in Kennington. Construction began in 1876 and the church was consecrated on 15 July 1879 by Henry Philpott, Bishop of Worcester.

The building was made a Grade II* listed building on 19 November 1953.

== Design ==
The exterior of the church building is made of red brick and features an ashlar belt course, and has plain tile and lead roofing. It was built in the Gothic Revival style. The building plan contains a three-stage west tower, a four-bay nave, and a three-bay chancel.

== Vicars ==
- Rev Charles Carus-Wilson (1875–1877)
- Rev Henry Maud (1877–1890)
- Rev Frederick Carus-Wilson (1891–1898)
- Rev Edward Archibald Parry (1898–1900)
- Rev Bertram Streatfield (1901–1920)
- Rev A. Mostyn Robinson (1920–1936)
- Rev Canon W.E. Daniels (1936–1942)
- Rev B.E. Eldridge (1942–1952)
- Bishop Houghton (1953–1959)
- Rev Cecil Redgrave (1960–1976)
- Rev Brian Ruff (1976–1990)
- Rev Alister Mort (1990–2005)
- Rev Paul Manuel (2007–2015)
- Rev Joanna Parker (2017–2023)
- Rev Tim Broadbent (2023-)
