= Warwick Hospital =

- South Warwickshire University NHS Foundation Trust
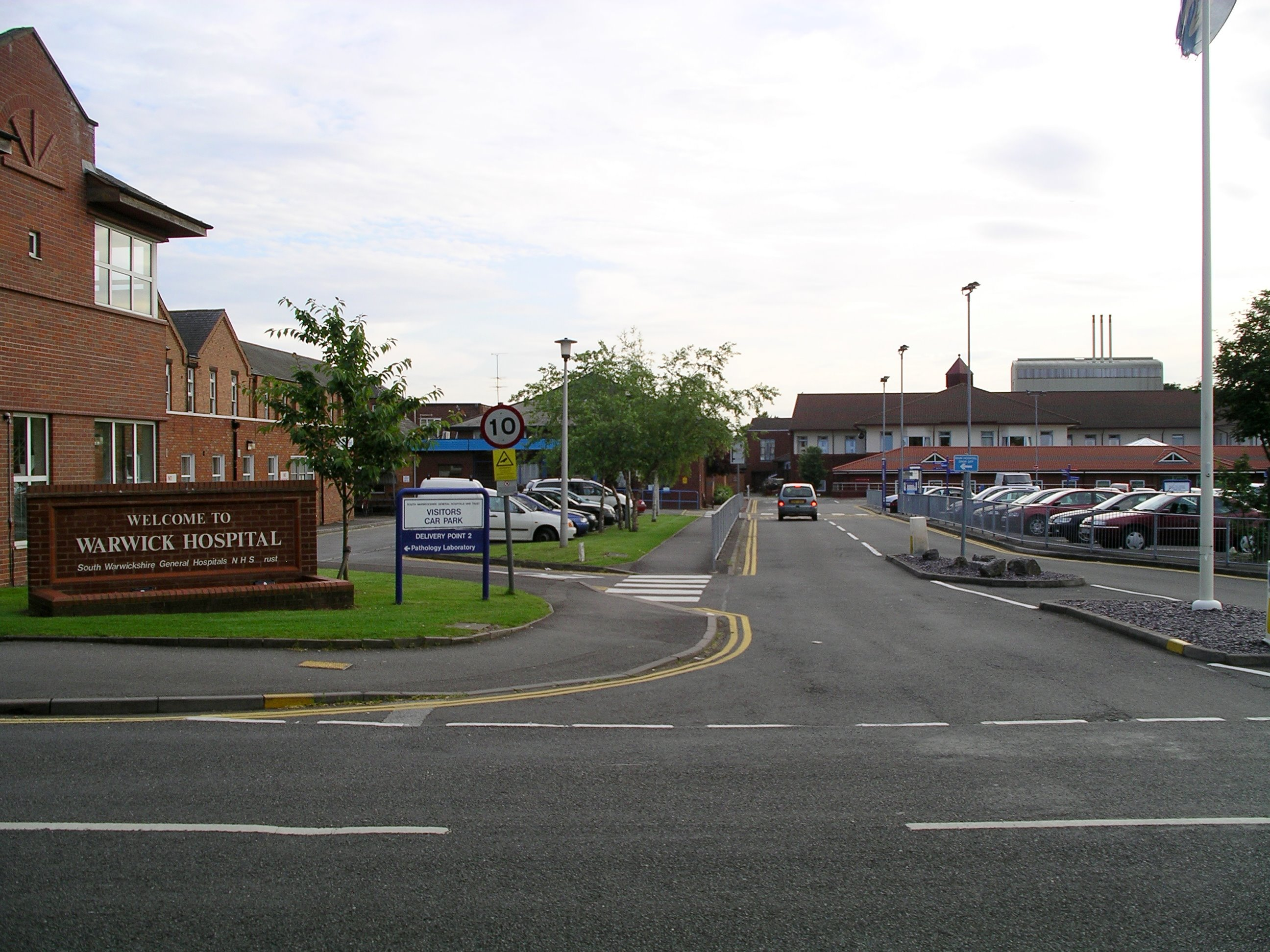
- The main entrance on Lakin Road, Warwick.

Geography
- Location: Warwick, Warwickshire, England
- Coordinates: 52.2903°N 1.5836°W

Organisation
- Care system: NHS
- Type: General
- Affiliated university: Warwick Medical School

Services
- Emergency department: Yes
- Beds: 350

History
- Founded: 1848

Links
- Website: www.swft.nhs.uk/our-hospitals/warwick-hospital

Warwick Hospital on Lakin Road in the northwest of Warwick, Warwickshire, England is run by South Warwickshire University NHS Foundation Trust.

== History ==
The facility has its origins in the infirmary built for the Warwick Union Poorhouse in Union Road (now Lakin Road) in 1848. The infirmary was extended in 1857 and 1876 with a chapel and mortuary following in 1883. A new purpose-built hospital was completed in 1903 and the old workhouse, which became known as the Warwick Public Assistance Institution, was integrated into the new hospital after 1930. The hospital joined the National Health Service in 1948 and the Public Assistance Institution ceased to operate as a separate body from 1949.

The main maternity unit for the district was moved from Warneford Hospital in Leamington Spa to Warwick in 1993. A new cancer centre known as the Aylesford Unit opened in a dedicated building in February 2010. The hospital also started work on a new birthing centre in 2018.

== Gallery ==
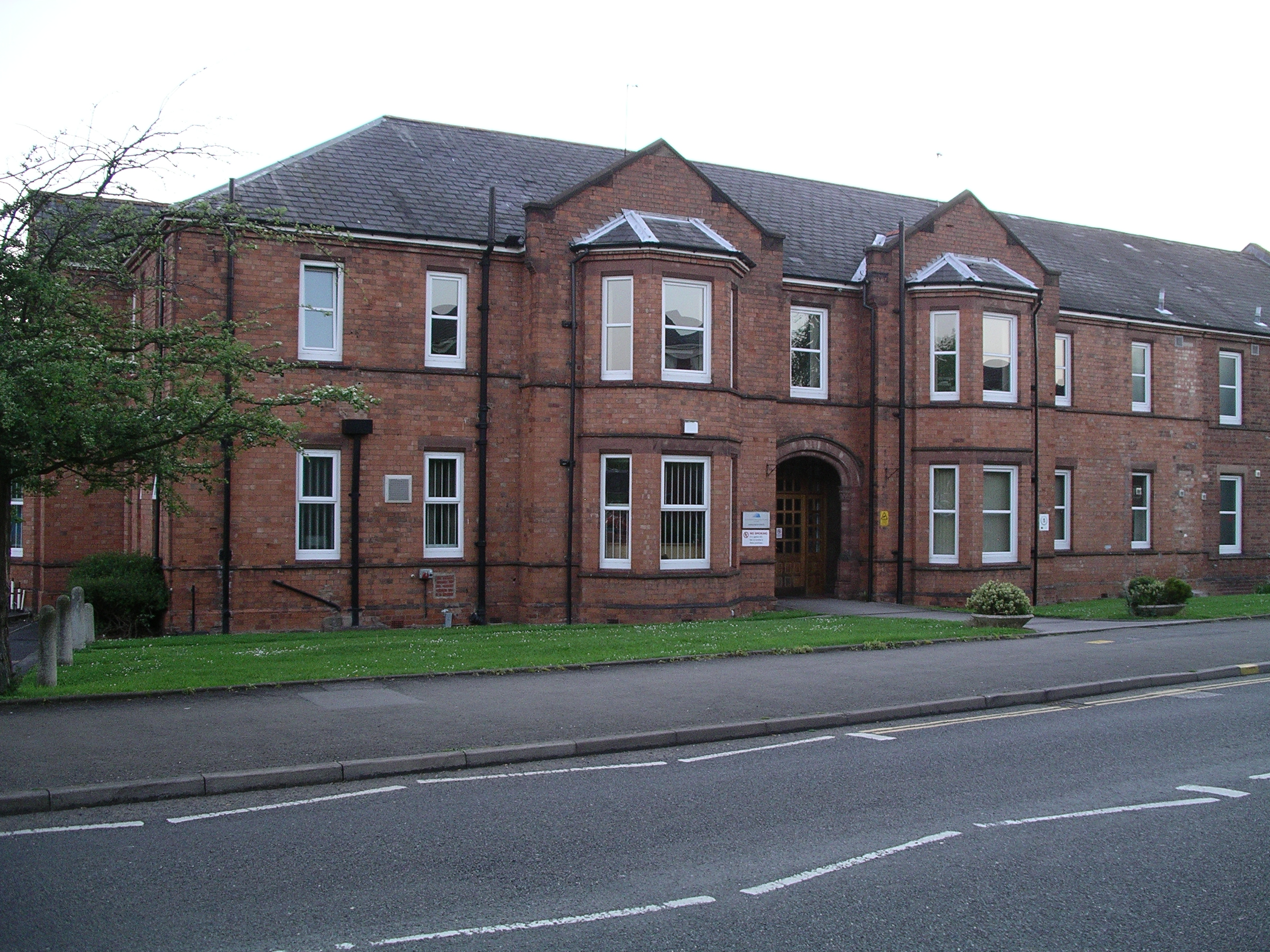
Old buildings

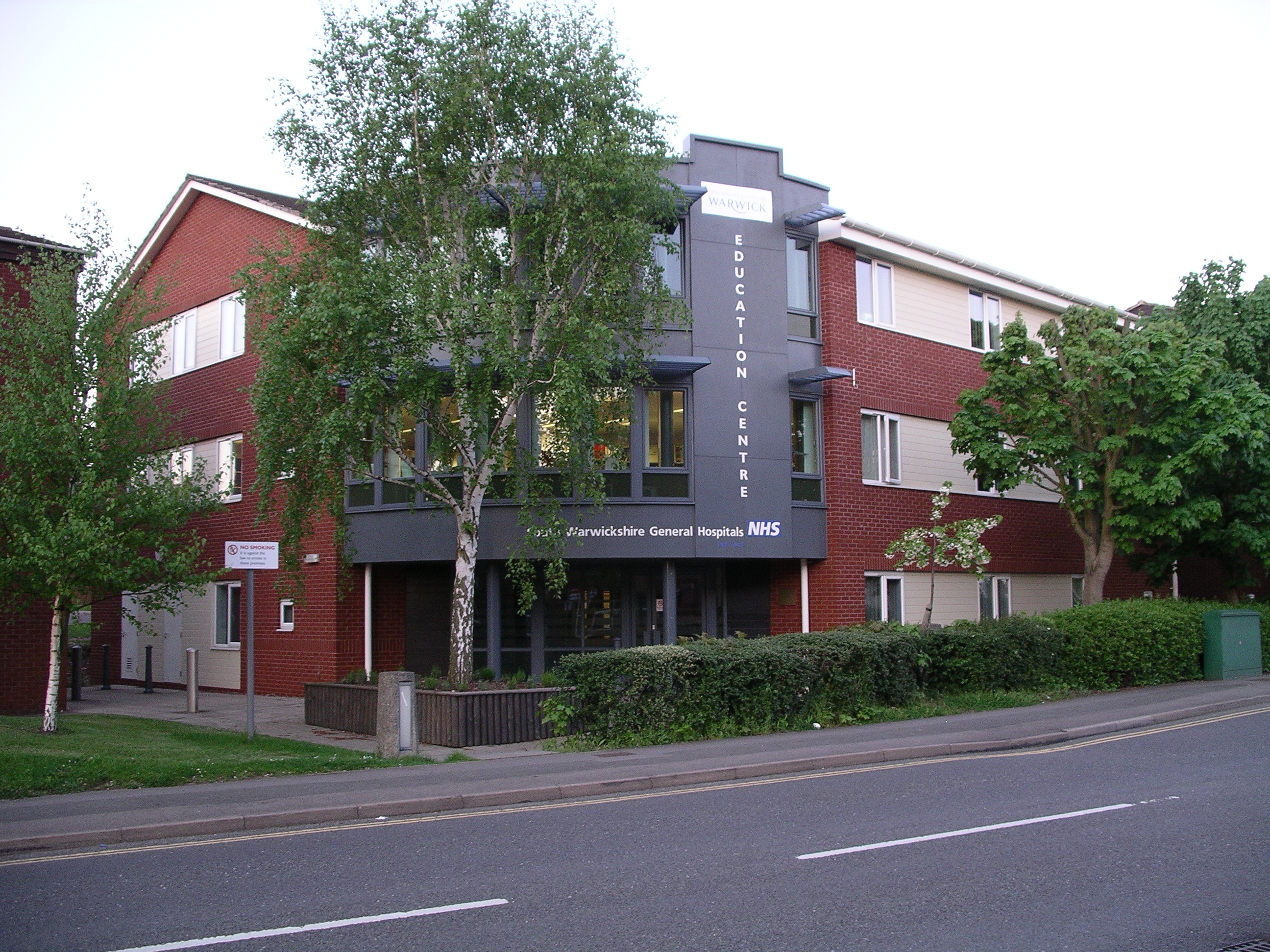
Education Centre

== See also ==
- List of hospitals in England
