= Royal Spa Centre =

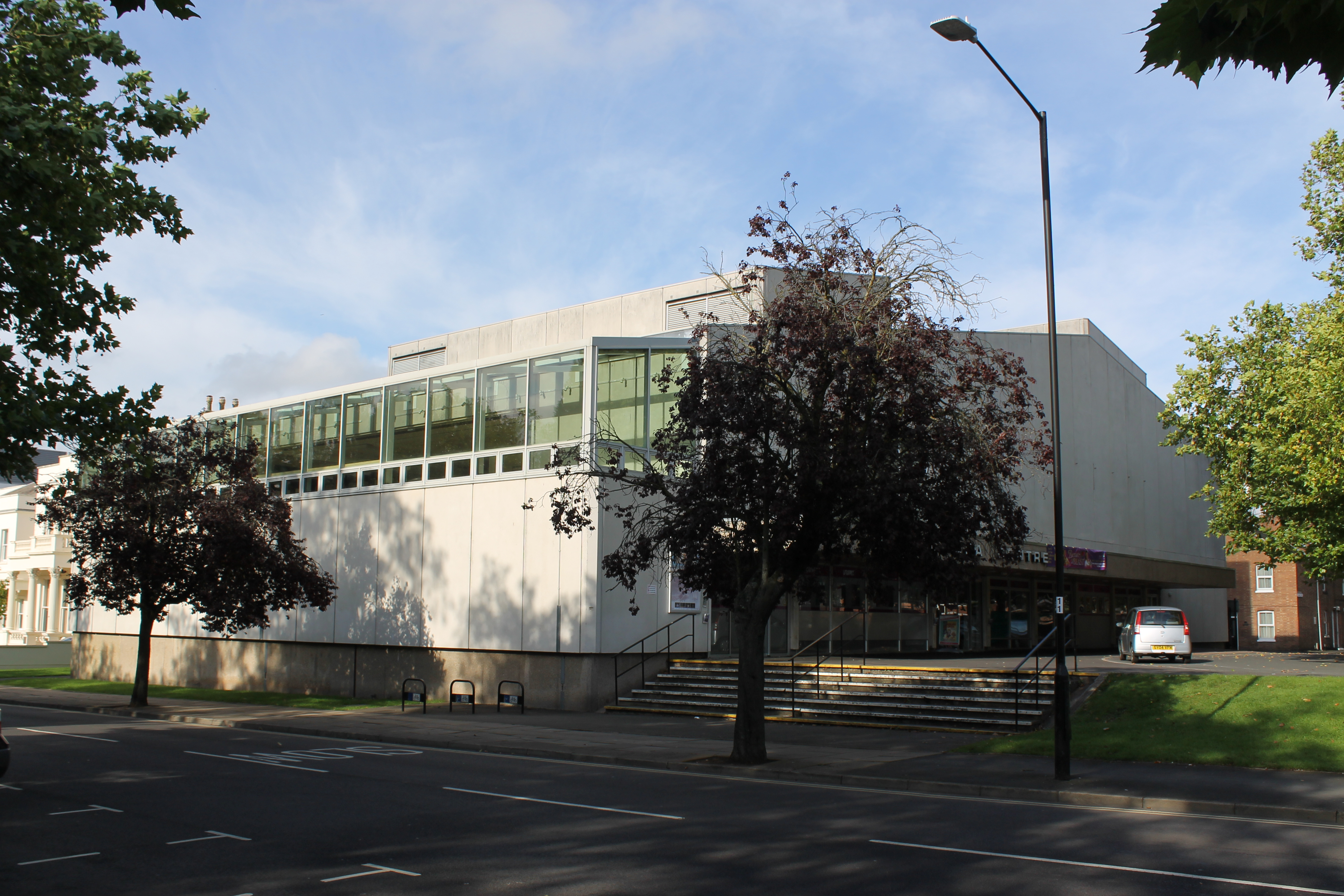
- Interactive map of the Royal Spa Centre area

General information
- Type: Theatre
- Location: England
- Coordinates: 52.2887°N 1.5317°W
- Opened: 15 June 1972

Design and construction
- Architect: Frederick Gibberd

Website
- www.warwickdc.gov.uk/royalspacentre/

The Royal Spa Centre is a Theatre in Leamington Spa, England. The Centre was officially opened on 15 June 1972 by Anthony Eden, one-time MP for Warwick and Leamington and Prime Minister. It was designed by the Architect Sir Frederick Gibberd and has two auditoria, the first of which is a traditional theatre which can hold 667 people. The second is a cinema which holds up to 188 and can be used to show films or as a small theatre space.

== Events ==
As well as hosting productions by local theatre, music and arts groups, the centre also welcomes national and international acts. Concerts, dance, wrestling, variety shows, cinema and ballet have all been accommodated. The National Blood Service holds drop-in donation sessions and there are numerous fairs and exhibitions held too. In 2008 the World Powerlifting Championships were held there. There are also weekly activity groups for senior citizens.

The cinema screen films that would not normally be seen at a multiplex, such as arthouse, subtitled or re-runs of popular films. Other facilities in the Centre include two bars licensed to sell alcohol and a small meeting room.

== Notable performers ==
Some of the famous people to have performed at the venue are, Ken Dodd, Charlie Watts, Joan Collins, Jim Davidson, Mike Skinner, Derren Brown, The Incredible String Band, Alexei Sayle, Jimmy Carr, James Acaster and Chris Addison.
