= Warwickshire Nuffield Hospital =

Hospital in Leamington Spa, Warwickshire. England

- Nuffield Health
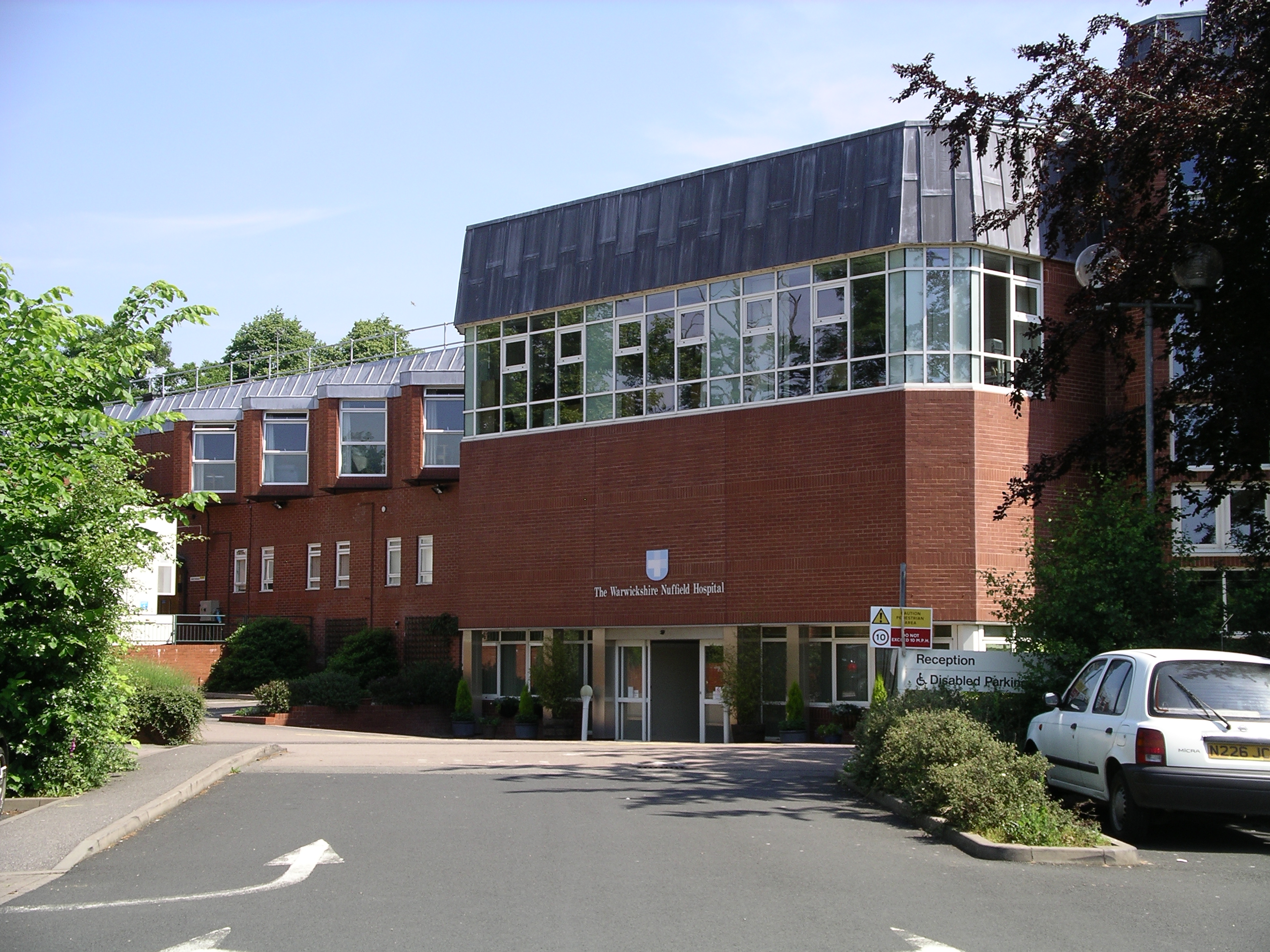
- Main entrance

- Shown in Warwickshire

Geography
- Location: The Chase; Old Milverton Lane; Leamington Spa, Warwickshire, England
- Coordinates: 52.3107°N 1.5405°W

Organisation
- Care system: Private
- Type: General

Services
- Emergency department: No
- Beds: 43

History
- Founded: 1981

Warwickshire Nuffield Hospital is a not-for-profit private hospital situated in the north of Leamington Spa, Warwickshire, England.

== History ==
The hospital was established in 1981 as a charitable trust and joined the Nuffield Hospitals group in 1994, which rebranded to Nuffield Health.
