= Warneford Hospital, Leamington Spa =

Hospital in Warwickshire, England

Warneford Hospital
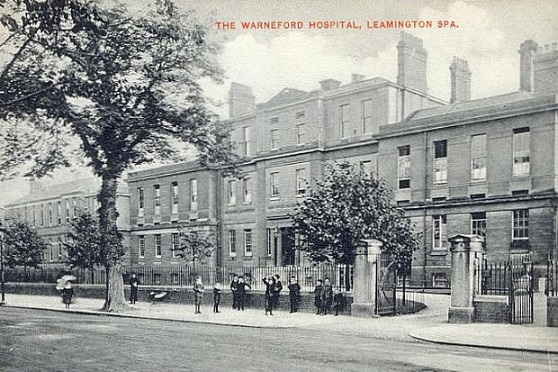
- Warneford Hospital

- Shown in Warwickshire

Geography
- Location: Leamington Spa, Warwickshire, England
- Coordinates: 52.28405°N 1.52550°W

Organisation
- Care system: NHS
- Type: General

History
- Founded: 1834
- Closed: 1993

Links
- Lists: Hospitals in England

Warneford Hospital was an institution which served as the main hospital for the town of Leamington Spa, Warwickshire between its opening in 1834 and its closure in 1993.

== History ==
The hospital was named after Samuel Wilson Warneford, a philanthropist who donated £3,000 of the £4,000 needed to build the hospital. The foundation stone was laid in 1832 and it opened in 1834. It was initially funded either by the patients themselves, by wealthy individual donors or by collections made from the general public.

The maternity unit, the Cay Block, was financed by donations and collections organised by Mrs Annie Cay. The hospital became the main birthplace for local babies after the Cay Block opened in 1939. The hospital joined the National Health Service in 1948 and Radio Warneford first broadcast in 1973.

After services transferred to either Warwick Hospital or Walsgrave Hospital (now University Hospital Coventry), the hospital closed in 1993.

== Notable patients ==
- Ernest Parke (1860-1944), journalist and newspaper editor, died here
