= Lights of Leamington Festival =

The Lights of Leamington Festival was an annual lights festival in Leamington Spa, Warwickshire, held from 1951 to 1961. It involved lightshows, animated displays, fireworks, illuminated replicas of skylines, and music and dance. Visitors came from the wider Midlands area.

== Background ==
Lights festivals have been held in several English towns, the most well-known being the English seaside town Blackpool which has held a lights festival since 1879. In the 1940s, during World War II and the post-war austerity era, there were no festivals, but in 1949 Blackpool restarted the event. In the 1950s, these Blackpool Illuminations involved illuminated tableaux, including a 120 feet long New York City skyline, back-lit 3D models, and animated displays.

== History ==
In 1951, the Warwickshire town of Leamington Spa held its first lights festival, as part of the nationwide Festival of Britain, with the goal to lift people's spirits following years of austerity. Jephson Gardens, a Victorian park in the centre of town, was chosen as location. Scores of electricians were recruited for the construction, overseen by officials of the East Midlands Electricity Board. Electric lights were hung in trees, illuminated floats with musicians put on the park's lake, and illuminated dioramas of the Alps and of the skylines of New York and Venice built on the lake's shore. Dancing performances and firework shows were featured. More than 10,000 flowers were used in a floral clock display.

By 1957, Leamington's illuminations were so popular in the Midlands region that officials from towns in Warwickshire and nearby counties were looking for ways to replicate its success. The Lights of Leamington Festival was said to rival the Blackpool Illuminations. Each year, until 1961, it ran for 10 weeks. In total, it attracted millions of visitors.

== Revival ==
In 2010, a lantern parade inspired by the original festival was organised, and has since been held annually, with thousands of participants. In 2022, a feasibility study was funded to determine if reviving the lights festival would be viable. In February 2025, an exhibition opened in Leamington Spa, featuring the memories of the people who had visited the festival in their youth, as well as photographs and artifacts. Around 6,000 visitors came to the exhibition. The exhibition will have a permanent home in the Warwickshire County Records Office. Running concurrently for a few days, a lightshow inspired by the original lights festival was held in Jephson Gardens and the Pump Room Gardens, attracting 39,000 visitors.
