= Royal Priors Shopping Centre =

Shopping centre in Leamington Spa, England

Coordinates: 52.291405°N 1.534509°W

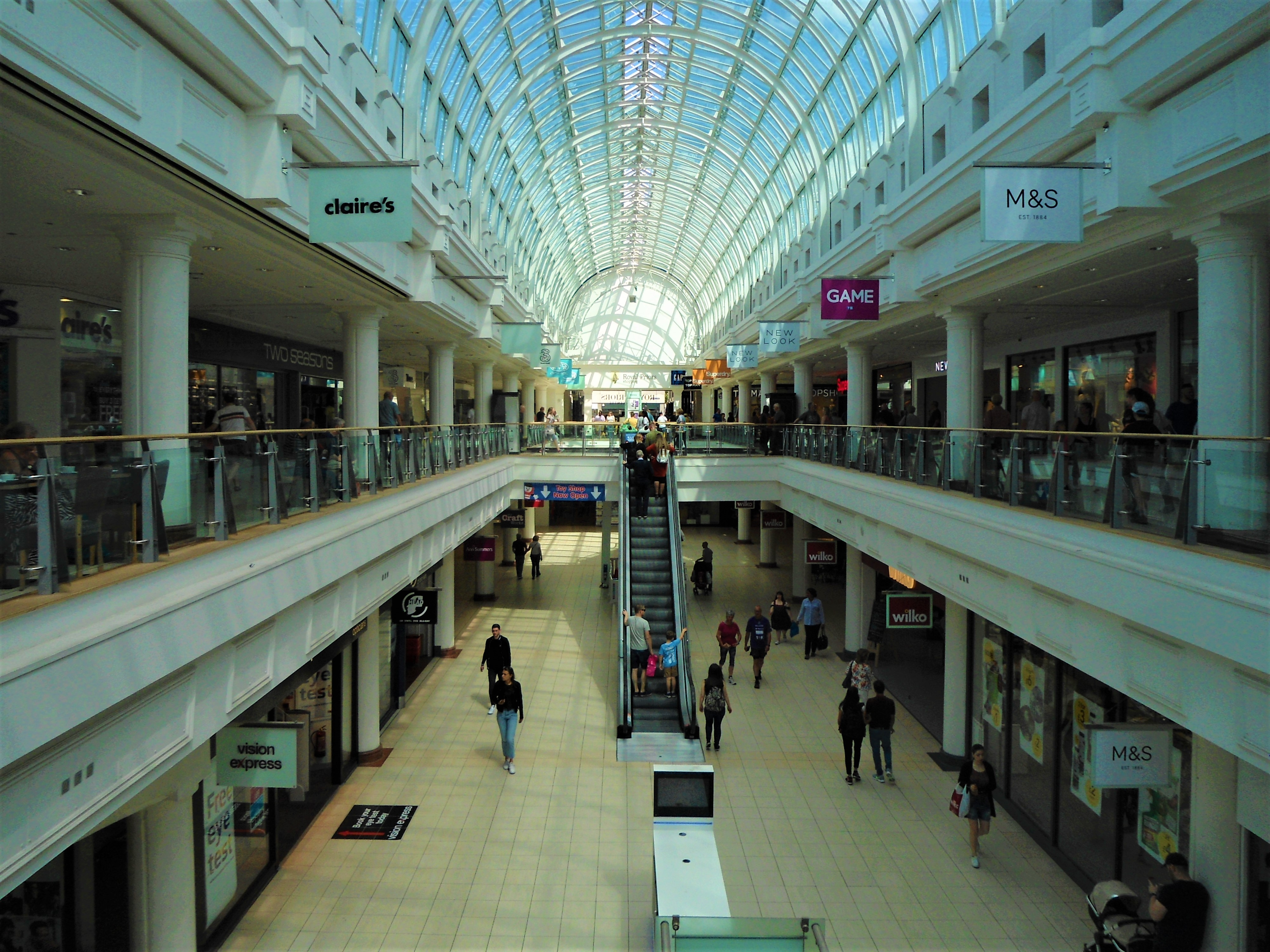
Centre interior in 2019

Royal Priors Shopping Centre is a two-storey shopping precinct located in the town of Leamington Spa, England.

It in located in the centre of the town on the main street, The Parade. Opened in 1988 by Queen Elizabeth II at a cost of £35 million, there is a seven-storey car park adjacent to it and the town's bus stops are nearby.

The largest extension and refurbishment since it opened was in 2002 when a former outdoor court area to the north of the centre was covered over to increase indoor space at a cost of £7 million.

The centre was built on the former site of slum housing built between 1810 and 1840 by the wealthy of the town to house the poor and non-live in servants.
