= Bourton-on-the-Hill =

Village in Gloucestershire, England

Coordinates: 51.98°N 01.75°W

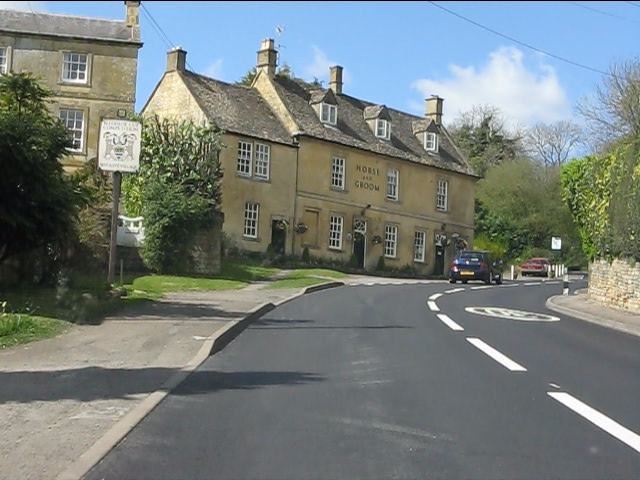

- Location within Gloucestershire
- Population: 391 (2011)
- OS grid reference: SP1732
  - London: 75 mi (121 km) NW
- Shire county: Gloucestershire
- Region: South West
- Country: England
- Sovereign state: United Kingdom
- Post town: Moreton-in-Marsh
- Postcode district: GL56
- Police: Gloucestershire
- Fire: Gloucestershire
- Ambulance: South Western
- UK Parliament: North Cotswolds

Bourton-on-the-Hill is a village and civil parish in the Cotswold district of Gloucestershire, England, about 2 miles (3 km) west of Moreton-in-Marsh. In 2010 it had an estimated population of 288. The village overlooks the surrounding hills of the Cotswolds and lies on the Heart of England Way, which heads southwards to Bourton-on-the-Water and northwards to Cannock Chase. The village is also connected by a footpath to the Cotswold Way, via Blockley and Chipping Campden.

Bourton-on-the-Hill is home to many notable buildings including the Grade I listed St. Lawrence's Church, Slatters Cottage, a stone cottage dating back to the 17th century, Horseshoe Cottage, a 3-storey stone cottage dating back to the 1750s and a public house, the Horse and Groom.

It is also home to several attractions, for example the Batsford Arboretum, the Cotswold Falconry Centre and Bourton House and Gardens and it is also within walking distance of the house and gardens at Sezincote.

== See also ==
- Samuel Wilson Warneford
