= Leamington chess club =

Leamington Chess Club
- Type: Regional Chess Club
- Founded: 1851
- Location: Leamington Spa
- Country: England
- Website: Official Website

Leamington Chess Club was founded in 1851 in Royal Leamington Spa, the year of the first international chess tournament in London.

The club currently competes in the Leamington and District Chess League with neighbouring clubs including Solihull, Stratford, Banbury, Kenilworth, Solihull and Nuneaton. The club is based at the Guys Cliffe Avenue Tennis & Squash Club, Leamington Spa, Warwickshire, CV32 6LZ, and meets every Tuesday, year round, starting at 7.30pm.

== History ==
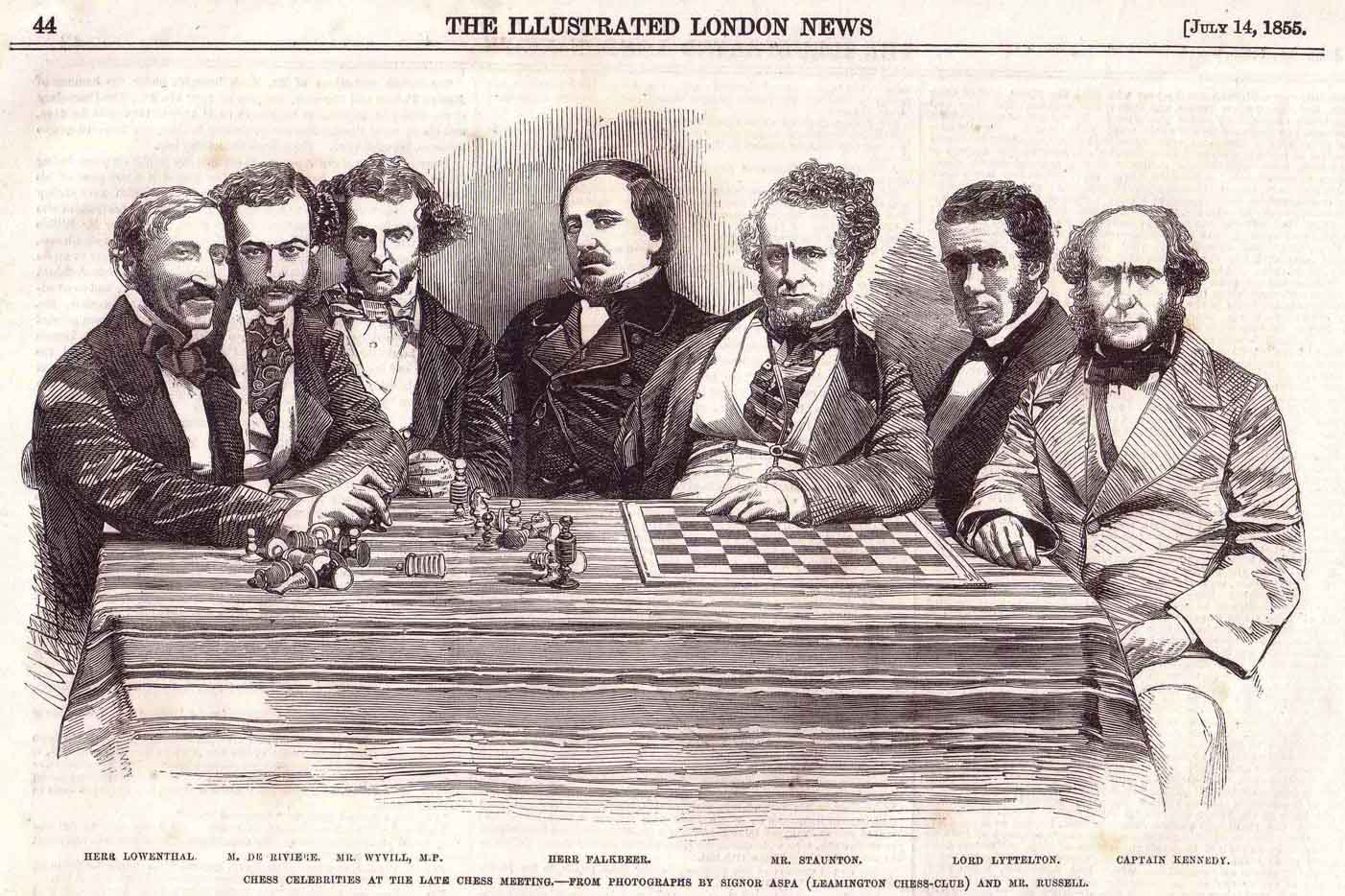
Chess Celebrities at the Leamington Chess Club Meeting, in the Regent Hotel, 25 June 1855

The first president of the club was the Rev. John Henry Smith, the Vicar of Milverton, The secretary was the Rev W S Temple.

In 1858, the "Chess Association" as it now styled itself, held a meeting at Queen's College, Birmingham. On 27 August, Paul Morphy gave a blindfold simultaneous display against eight opponents, chosen apparently more for their official positions than their chess ability. One board was taken by the new secretary of the Leamington Chess Club, Jabez Carr, who tried to confuse the blindfolded Morphy with an irregular flank opening and was duly trounced in 23 moves.

In 1885, the Rev William Grundy, headmaster of King's School in Warwick and a member of the Leamington Chess Club, organised a small invitation Chess Congress at the school from 5 to 10 January. Again there were two tournaments. The First Class ended in a tie between Grundy and Rev John Coker of Buckinghamshire. The Second Class was won by Rev. Arthur Percy Dodd, at the time curate of Weston under Wetherley and secretary of the Leamington Chess Club. There were also three consultation games, one of which contributed to the theory of the Steinitz Gambit in the Vienna Game. It was published in the British Chess Magazine and the white king was chased right across the board, where the tables were turned and it helped to mate black in only twenty moves. Rosario Aspa, a Sicilian-born member of the Leamington Club, was one of the victorious consultees.

In December 1890, the great J H Blackburne gave two simultaneous displays at the Royal Pump Rooms against the members of the Leamington Club, winning all 22 games on 22 December and the next day taking on six players blindfolded, winning four games and drawing two. A document from 1896 lists Blackburne as an honorary member of the club and at that time the club possessed a framed list of past members which also included Howard Staunton and Herr Lowenthal from the 1850s.

In the earliest document still in the club archive (existing only in photocopied form) dated February 1891, with the address "Pump Room", Signor Aspa, Rev. A.P. Dodd, W. Hannay Esq. and Dr. Haynes are named as vice-presidents and the club president as Right Hon. Arthur Wellesley Peel. The earliest known evidence of the latter comes from an article (reprinted from the Hereford Times) on the popularity of chess in the smoke-room of the House of Commons, in the December 1890 British Chess Magazine. "The Speaker, we presume, is a chessplayer, since he is the president of the Leamington Chess Club." It is not known when A W Peel (youngest son of Sir Robert Peel) became club president but from 1865 he had been one of the two MPs representing rural Warwickshire and, having been elected Speaker of the House of Commons in 1884 following franchise reform, in 1885 he was returned unopposed by the new single-member constituency of Warwick and Leamington. According to the Dictionary of National Biography, "Peel proved to be a formidable Speaker.... his moral effect was famously seen on the night of 27 July 1893 when during the committee stage of the second [Irish] Home Rule Bill a serious fight broke out on the floor of the House. The chairman of committees summoned the speaker whose arrival in the house, like that of 'a parent wise as well as fond' at once restored order." Presumably keeping Leamington Chess Club in order was a doddle in comparison. He retired as Speaker for reasons of ill-health and was raised to the peerage; Rt. Hon. Viscount Peel remained president until at least 1896.

== Notable members past and present ==
David Hodgkins 1969-2015 was an Olympian in both physical and mental arts, competing in judo at the Paralympic Games of both Seoul (winning a bronze medal to go with his European silver) and Barcelona. He was a talented chess player who represented his country in Blind Chess Olympiads in Laguna (1996) and Chennai (2012). One of his wins from the latter tournament is given below, a quick win which helped Great Britain finish 7th out of 25 in the final group.

White: David Hodgkins
Black: Gregor Cizman

Blind Chess Olympiad, Chennai, 18 August 2012

1. d4 d5 2. Nf3 Nf6 3. e3 Bf5 4. c4 c6 5. cd5 cd5 6. Qb3 Qc7 7. Bd2 Nbd7 8. Bb5 e6 9. O-O a6 10. Rc1 Qb6 11. Bd7 Nd7 12. Nc3 Bd6 13. Na4 Qb3 14. ab3 Bg4 15. Ne1 Be2 16. Nc3 Bh5 17. Nb5

Daniel Kim achieved third place in his first ever adult chess tournament aged 8 and second place in Warwickshire's under-10 championship

Arthur Wellesley Peel (the son of Sir Robert Peel) was a British Liberal politician who represented Warwick and, after subsequent boundary changes, Leamington and Warwick, and was Speaker of the House of Commons from 1884 to 1895. Peel was the Speaker of the House of Commons and the president of Leamington Chess Club.
