= Parade, Leamington Spa =

Street in Leamington Spa, Warwickshire, England

Parade is a 0.51 mile (0.82 kilometre) long street in the town of Royal Leamington Spa in Warwickshire, England. Running in a north-south direction, it forms part of the longer B4087 which runs from the A445 in Leamington to the B4086 in Wellesbourne. The road is the central shopping hub of the town, and contains many high street stores, as well as some of the best examples of Regency architecture for which the town is known. It is commonly called "the Parade", and spoken of as such, but all maps and resources such as the Royal Mail's postcode database simply have "Parade".

== History ==
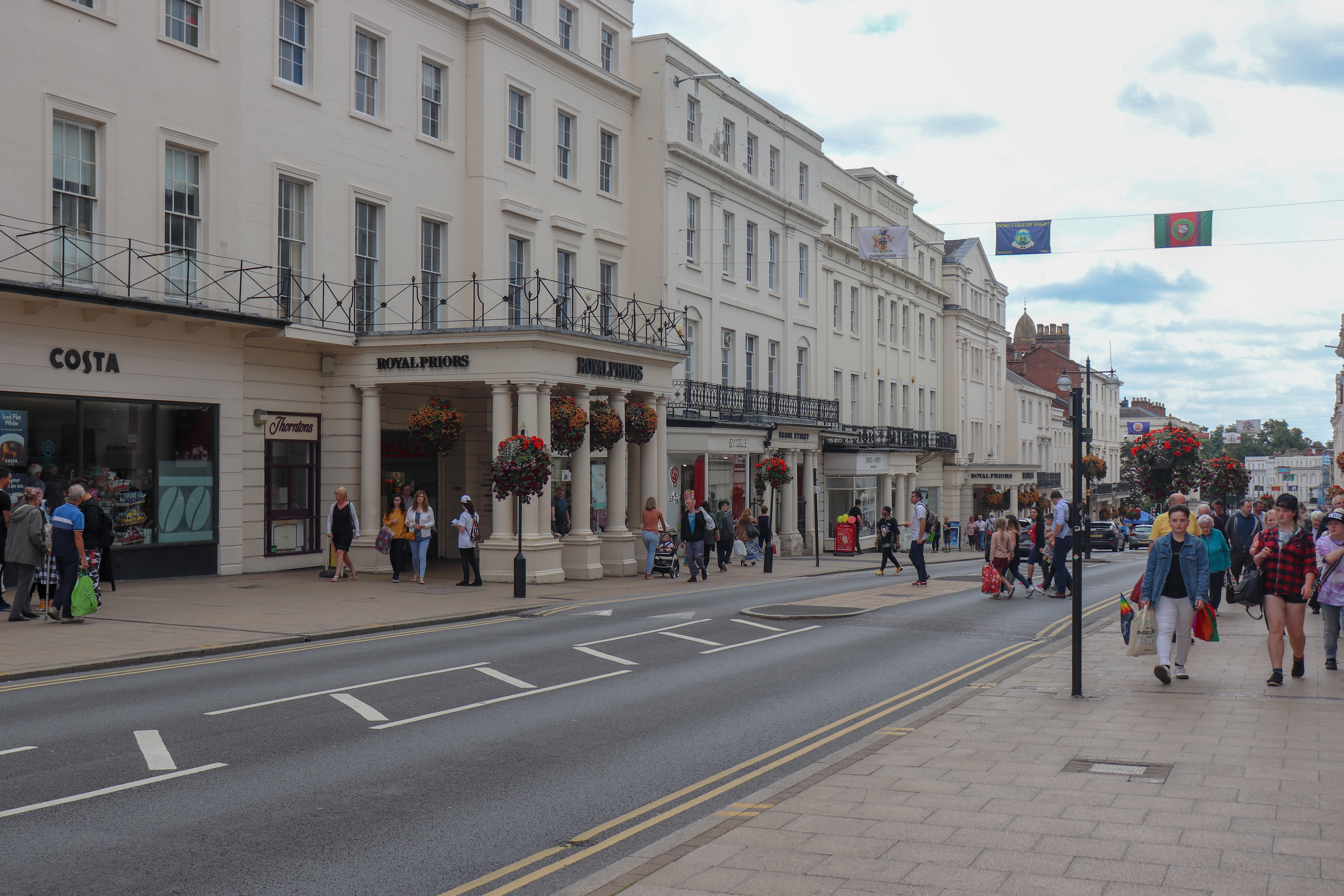
The upper section of Parade

In the early 19th century Leamington Priors, as it was known, was a village with about three hundred inhabitants. The southern part of the Parade was once part of Lillington Lane, which led to the nearby village of Lillington. Between 1808 and 1860 Leamington developed rapidly northwards away from its village origins. Lillington Lane was extended to the length of the Parade and named "Lower Union Parade" (from 1808), "Upper Union Parade" (from 1820) and "Lansdowne Place" in sections from south to north. In 1860 the street took on its current name.

The name Parade came partly because many of the facilities that made Leamington a notable spa town lined the street. The Royal Pump Rooms were opened in 1814, the Regent Hotel in 1819 and the Jephson Gardens in 1834. Most of the town's fashionable housing was built north of the river, as well as the library and the theatre. Later Victorian buildings of note include an obelisk/drinking fountain dedicated to local politician and philanthropist Henry Bright (1880) and the town hall with tower (1884).

In 1988 the town's main shopping precinct, the Royal Priors Shopping Centre, opened. For a short time there was a second precinct, the Regency Arcade, but it closed and has been converted into a shop and an hotel.
