= Royal Pump Room Gardens =

Open space in centre of Leamington Spa, Warwickshire, England

Coordinates: 52.2873°N 1.5356°W

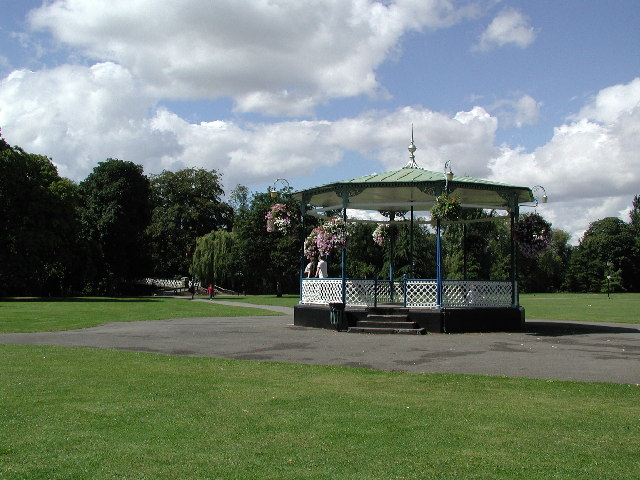
The gardens and pre-2019 bandstand

The Royal Pump Room Gardens is a popular open space found in the centre of Leamington Spa, Warwickshire, England, next to the Royal Pump Rooms and just north of the River Leam. Despite being named "gardens" there is only one 5.4-acre (22,000 m^{2}) area divided by footpaths with an ironwork bandstand in the centre.

Opened in 1814 with the Pump Rooms themselves, to begin with, the gardens were only for the use of patrons of the Pump Rooms "to afford them pleasant promenades." The original bandstand was later erected and bands played in the afternoon and evening during the summer (and other public holidays) for those paying to use the baths. During these early days the famed tightrope walker Charles Blondin crossed the area in July 1851. However in 1876 the gardens were opened to the public. In 1881 plans were made to build the town hall on the gardens but at the last minute a change of site was agreed and it was built further north near The Regent Hotel. In 1893 a pedestrian bridge called York Bridge was built over the river. The second bandstand was designed by Walter MacFarlane & Co and founded in Glasgow. It was installed in 1896. Also the only remaining examples of the original Leamington cast iron gas lamps can be found alongside the south side of the gardens.

The gardens originally contained decorative flower beds but with the decline in fortunes of the Pump Rooms themselves these have been grassed over. Bands still play in the bandstand, although very infrequently but the gardens host the annual Leamington Peace Festival, a fun fair once a year and farmers markets once a month. It is also a popular place for young people, especially those from the nearby Warwick University to sunbathe and play football. As it lies so close to the river it is part of the town that is most frequently flooded. The last two times such floods occurred were at Easter 1998 and in the summer of 2007.

In March 2012 new lights in iron arches (commonly known as the Linden Arches) were erected along the pathway furthest from the river. They were officially unveiled by Prince Richard, Duke of Gloucester. This is the first major alteration to the park's superficial appearance since 1896. This was followed later in the decade when the bandstand was removed in autumn 2018 and returned re-furbished and painted different colours in spring 2019. The paths were slightly re-routed and totally re-paved and a new seating area with rock features and a small pond was constructed at the western end of the gardens. The £1.4 million project also included new railings and new trees being planted.
