= Samuel Wilson Warneford =

English cleric and philanthropist

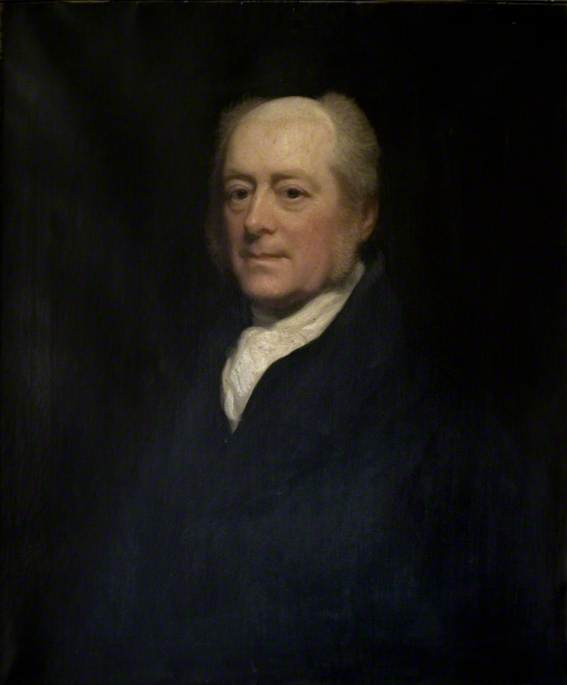
Samuel Wilson Warneford, portrait in oils by Thomas Phillips

Samuel Wilson Warneford (1763 – 11 January 1855) was an astute and eccentric English cleric and philanthropist from an old but generally impoverished family. He married into money, as his father had done, and thereafter spent his life trying to dispose of his fortune to the benefit of religious, educational and medical causes in England and abroad. A zealot, long widowed and childless, his domestic life was frugal and he left nothing to his family.

== Life ==
Samuel Warneford was born in 1763, possibly in the village of Sevenhampton, near Highworth in Wiltshire, England. His father, an ordained minister called Francis Warneford, came from a long-established but often penurious landowning family whose family seat was Warneford Place, in Sevenhampton, where they owned all of the land. The family's finances had been much improved when Francis married his second wife, Catherine, the daughter of a wealthy London-based drug merchant; after her death, he married Samuel's mother, also called Catherine. Samuel was the younger of two sons and had at least two sisters, who never married and lived with him in adult life.

From 1779, Warneford attended University College, Oxford, from where he was awarded a BA degree in 1783 and an MA in 1786. He was ordained in 1787 and became curate at what is now called Brize Norton and was then known as Norton Broyne, supplementing his qualifications with the degree of BCL in 1790. He was vicar at Bures St Mary in Suffolk from 1795 to 1798. (Note: Samuel Warneford's older brother, Francis, was also an Oxford graduate and a cleric but never had the wealth that accrued to Samuel, living his adulthood as a village vicar.)

In September 1796, like his father, Samuel married into money: his wife, Margaret, was a daughter of Edward Loveden Loveden, a cheese merchant and Member of Parliament. Margaret's father objected to the arrangement but its progression brought together the fortunes of two families and was then further enhanced by a legacy of £34,000 left to his sickly wife by her grandfather. She died, insane and childless, three years after the marriage. Thereafter, Warneford developed a reputation for eccentricity and for a parsimonious domestic lifestyle, as well as for his philanthropy.

Warneford's views on religious matters were zealous, fierce even, and he had a dislike for those who believed differently. His friend and biographer, Vaughan Thomas, noted that he saw "the subtle designs of the Jesuits, and the insidious intrusion of malignant dissenters" as the most significant challenge to his philanthropic endeavours. He bought the advowsons of Lydiard Millicent, in Wiltshire, and Bourton-on-the-Hill, in Gloucestershire, in 1809 and 1810, respectively, and the latter became his principal place of residence. It was also in 1810 that he was awarded a DCL degree. He retained the rectorship of Lydiard Millicent until his death in 1855, although he sold the advowson to Pembroke College, Oxford in 1828. In additional to these clerical interests, he was appointed an honorary canon of Gloucester Cathedral in 1844.

Described as shy, puny and delicate as a child, Warneford was also considered reclusive as an adult, despite having to undertake considerable amounts of travel to oversee his benefactions. His dress was generally outmoded, his house unkempt, and the horses that he relied upon to draw his carriage for his many miles of travel were bought when they were old and past their best. Always attentive to his legacy, he left many codicils to his will, which omitted his family just as he had refused them charity during his lifetime. He was not unaware of his nature, describing himself on one occasion as "a miser – a calculating miser".

Warneford died on 11 January 1855 at his rectory in Bourton, aged 92, and was buried in the church there. He may have had regrets as he lay dying, saying that "I should have been kinder, I should have been more considerate and understanding."

== Philanthropy ==
W. M. Priest notes that "It seems that [Warneford] did not want the huge fortune he acquired and deliberately spent his life getting rid of it." He was astute as well as rich, spreading his philanthropy wide across the fields of religion, education and healthcare. But he considered his donation of money, or the refusal of it, to be a carrot-and-stick affair, whereby worthy projects were rewarded and the unworthy punished. According to historian William Whyte he could be "tyrannical" in his attempts to control the use of his money and his donations were often made incrementally so that he could monitor progress and, in particular, remedy perceived problems. He favoured the practical over the ostentatious and spread his beneficence not only in his own country but also to religious causes in places such as Africa, Australia, New Zealand and Nova Scotia.

Locally, Warneford spent £1,000 refitting his own church in Bourton and also a similar sum on that of the church at the nearby Moreton-in-Marsh. There and throughout the rest of the Gloucester diocese, he financed the building of schools and the provision of medical aid, while in Bourton he also provided facilities for older people. On the other hand, he fell out with his parishioners at Lydiard Millicent when they objected to his attempts to increase the tithe and the church there fell into disrepair as he refused to spend money on it despite it being his responsibility to do so.

Other fundings with religious connections included donations to the Society for the Propagation of the Gospel, the Society for Promoting Christian Knowledge and the Corporation for the Sons of the Clergy which, combined with bequests at his death, amounted to £200,000. He also donated the land for the Clergy Orphan School, near Canterbury, and again remembered it in his will, in this case with a £13,000 legacy.

As well as being a governor of Oxford's Radcliffe Infirmary, he sat on committees there and gave money and property together worth over £70,000 for the development of a new asylum for lunatics. (Note: The property gifted for the benefit of Radcliffe Infirmary included land as far away as Hellingly in Sussex.) His considerable and detailed interest in that project may have been spurred by his wife's insanity: he had rejected suggestions that she should be hospitalised, preferring to nurse her at home after being appalled during his inspections of several possible institutes. Originally known as the Radcliffe Asylum, his kickstarting of the project from 1831, when he became impatient that things had been dragging since 1812, resulted in the institution later bearing the name Warneford Lunatic Asylum from 1843.

Another significant involvement in healthcare provision was his £3,000 contribution towards the building of Warneford, Leamington, and South Warwickshire Hospital, which represented 75 per cent of the cost. Despite some later misgivings about what he considered to be financial extravagance at the hospital, which was then mainly a hydrotherapy facility, he bequeathed £10,000 to it on his death.

At King's College, London he provided money for medical scholarships and also for prizes intended to encourage religious development among its students. The concern for the religious attentions of medical students was a common theme, for Warneford believed them to be an ungodly lot, saying on one occasion that "What is said about the absorbing nature of a medical student's pursuits is but too true, and it is one of the evils which most requires remedy, it is this which narrows their minds and makes them bigots to low infidel views". Although certainly eccentric in many ways, his fears did have some basis in accepted wisdom because among the radical thinkers of the era were many who possessed a medical background.

From 1838, he followed a similar course to that adopted at King's in his dealings with the Birmingham Royal Medical School, later known as Queen's College, Birmingham, where his efforts were instrumental in bringing higher education to the city. His gifts to the value of £25,000 provided for chaplaincies as well as scholarships, a professorial chair in pastoral theology and new buildings. His involvement ensured that Queen's was an exclusively Anglican institution and as much a seminary as a medical school but his interest in the project was somewhat neglected at his death because of his concern that it had not developed according to his expectations. Of those expectations he noted "the inculcation of sound religious principles has been, and is, the basis of my donations either to your Hospital or your College ... All other objects are to me of secondary consideration."

Officers at both King's and Queen's sometimes frustrated him with their concerns regarding his zealotry. Whyte says that Warneford – in life "a grasping, avaricious, bigoted reactionary" – and John Owens – "a parsimonious, work-obsessed, easily offended bachelor, who gave little to charity in his lifetime" and whose legacy was the basis for Owens College in Manchester – were "disagreeable men, with deep pockets and few friends". The two institutions were very different but in the characters of their benefactors lie fundamental similarities often found in history, that philanthropy is not necessarily selfless and that "the good are not always very nice".
