= Regent Hotel =

Hotel in Royal Leamington Spa, Warwickshire, England

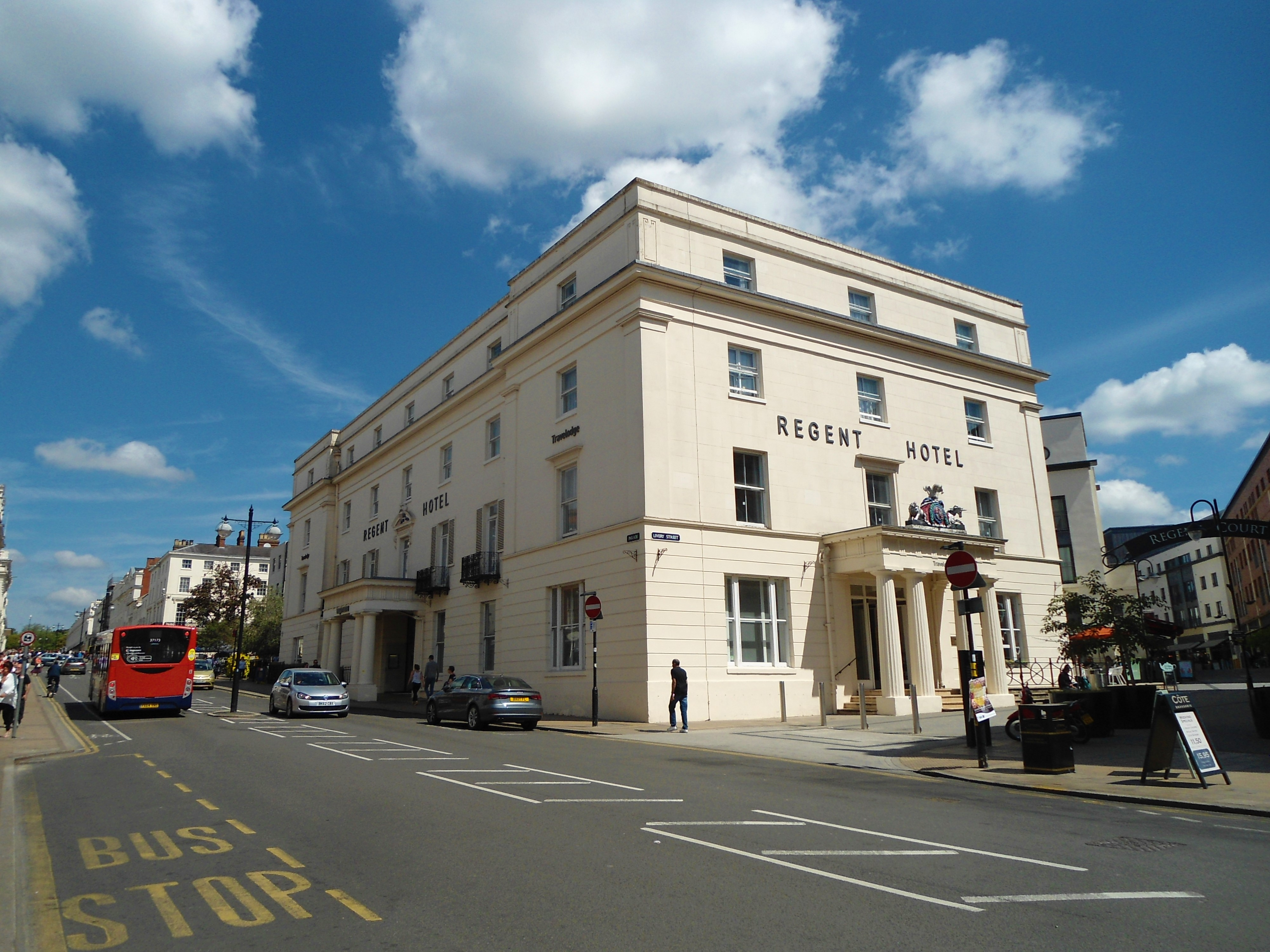
- Interactive map of Regent Hotel
- Location: Parade, Leamington Spa, Warwickshire, England
- Coordinates: 52.28976°N 1.53509°W

Listed Building – Grade II*
- Official name: Regent Hotel
- Designated: 19 November 1953
- Reference no.: 1381422

The Regent Hotel is a hotel in the town of Leamington Spa, Warwickshire, England. It is located in the centre of the town on the Parade.

== History ==
In 1809, a plot of land was purchased to build the hotel on, which cost £1,000. The foundation stone was laid eight years later, on 18 July 1818 by the granddaughter of the original landowner. The hotel was officially opened on 19 August 1819 by Mrs Greatheed, wife of the previous landowner Berties, accompanied by actress Sarah Siddons. The hotel opened as Williams Hotel, but 3 weeks later was renamed The Regent by permission of the Prince Regent (later George IV). When it opened, it was the largest hotel in Europe. In 1830 Princess Victoria, then aged 11, stayed overnight at the hotel with her father. Eight years later from the balcony of the hotel it was announced that Victoria, now Queen, had allowed the prefix Royal on its name, which the town still bears to the day. The hotel then had more than 100 rooms.

The first of the Regent Hotel's set of sporting visitors stayed at the hotel on 8 April 1882. These men had held a few other meetings around the county and had formed a cricket team. It was on this date however that Warwickshire County Cricket Club formally came into existence. The Directorate of Camouflage, part of the Ministry of Home Security moved its main base in early 1940 from London to the hotel and requisitioned the hotel until 1947. The Directorate brought 250 artists, designers and technicians to the town who worked in secret on aspects of military and civilian camouflage. In the 1940s, 1950s and 1960s, according to Billy Wright's autobiography Captain of England the England national football team used to meet before they travelled to away matches abroad. More recently the cast and crew of the British comedy Keeping Up Appearances including Patricia Routledge, Clive Swift and Geoffrey Hughes stayed at the hotel whilst filming in Leamington.

== The Hotel today ==
The hotel was designated a Grade II* listed building in 1953. The hotel closed in 1998 and its demolition was considered, which generated local opposition. In 2003 the hotel was refurbished as part of a regeneration scheme, reopening in March 2005 with 54 rooms. The total cost of the work was £3 million. Although the facade had changed little, most of the ground floor now houses a Wagamama restaurant, although it also contains a small café. The hotel itself, occupying the other floors, is a Travelodge.
