= List of public art in Warwickshire =

This is a list of public art in the Warwickshire county of England. This list applies only to works of public art on permanent display in an outdoor public space. For example, this does not include artworks in museums.

== Alcester ==
| Image | Title / subject | Location and coordinates | Date | Artist / designer | Type | Material | Dimensions | Designation | Owner / administrator | Notes |
|---|---|---|---|---|---|---|---|---|---|---|
| More images | Peace on Earth Globe | Globe Roundabout, Alcester 52.213870°N 1.872325°W | 1996 | Severn Lamb Ltd | Sculpture | | | | Alcester Town Council | Marks 50 years of peace after the end of the Second World War in 1945. Presented to the town of Alcester by Severn Lamb Ltd. It was erected on the site of the former Globe Hotel. |
| | The History Stone | Roman Alcester Museum - Seggs Lane, Alcester 52.213942°N 1.873251°W | 1969 | Walter Ritchie | Sculpture | stone | | | Alcester Town Council | There are six panels including a needle and spring, a goose, a Roman soldier, a lady on a horse and a man carrying a heavy sack. |

== Ansley ==
| Image | Title / subject | Location and coordinates | Date | Artist / designer | Type | Material | Dimensions | Designation | Owner / administrator | Notes |
|---|---|---|---|---|---|---|---|---|---|---|
| | Ansley's heritage and natural environment | Birmingham Road, Ansley village | 2009 | Graeme Mitcheson | Sculpture | Sandstone | | | | Installed as part of the North Arden Heritage Trail, a Heritage Lottery funded project. Scenes represent Ansley's heritage and natural environment including mining, railways, ribbons, Great Crested Newts, conkers and brooks. The central image is taken from the Norman arch at St Laurence Church and shows a man torn between the dragon and the lamb, represents the struggle of good against evil. |

== Atherstone ==
| Image | Title / subject | Location and coordinates | Date | Artist / designer | Type | Material | Dimensions | Designation | Owner / administrator | Notes |
|---|---|---|---|---|---|---|---|---|---|---|
| | Atherstone Ball Game | The Co-op, Station Street, Atherstone 52.577563°N 1.550799°W | | Michael Disley | Sculpture | Stone | | | North Warwickshire Borough Council | Based on the Shrovetide Ball Game. |

== Bedworth ==
| Image | Title / subject | Location and coordinates | Date | Artist / designer | Type | Material | Dimensions | Designation | Owner / administrator | Notes |
|---|---|---|---|---|---|---|---|---|---|---|
| More images | Celebrating Bedworth's Heritage | Corner of Rye Piece Ringway and King Street, Bedworth 52.479399°N 1.469209°W | 2004 | Graham Mitcheson | Sculpture | Stone | | | Nuneaton and Bedworth Borough Council | Celebrates Bedworth's industrial heritage. Formed to resemble stacked discs of wound ribbon (local ribbon industry), each disc commemorates an industry with a particular significance to Bedworth's past. |

== Dunchurch ==
| Image | Title / subject | Location and coordinates | Date | Artist / designer | Type | Material | Dimensions | Designation | Owner / administrator | Notes |
|---|---|---|---|---|---|---|---|---|---|---|
| | Lord John Scott | Rugby Road, Dunchurch 52.337084°N 1.289449°W | 1867 | Joseph Durham | Statue | Limestone | 2 metres (6.6 feet) high | Grade II listed | Rugby Borough Council | |

== Fillongley ==
| Image | Title / subject | Location and coordinates | Date | Artist / designer | Type | Material | Dimensions | Designation | Owner / administrator | Notes |
|---|---|---|---|---|---|---|---|---|---|---|
| More images | The Family | Nuneaton Road and Coventry Road, Fillongley 52.482776°N 1.588252°W | 2011 | Graeme Mitcheson | Sculpture | Kilkenny Limestone | | | North Warwickshire Borough Council | At a crossroads, not far from Nuneaton and Arbury Hall. |

== Henley-in-Arden ==
| Image | Title / subject | Location and coordinates | Date | Artist / designer | Type | Material | Dimensions | Designation | Owner / administrator | Notes |
|---|---|---|---|---|---|---|---|---|---|---|
| More images | Market Cross | High Street, Henley-in-Arden 52.292943°N 1.779799°W | 15th century | | Market Cross | Limestone | | Grade II listed | Stratford-on-Avon District Council | |

== Kenilworth ==
| Image | Title / subject | Location and coordinates | Date | Artist / designer | Type | Material | Dimensions | Designation | Owner / administrator | Notes |
|---|---|---|---|---|---|---|---|---|---|---|
| | Millennium Globe | Abbey End, Kenilworth 52.343939°N 1.579811°W | 2001 | | Kugel fountain | | | | Warwick District Council and Kenilworth Town Council | |

== Leamington Spa ==
=== Parade ===
| Image | Title / subject | Location and coordinates | Date | Artist / designer | Type | Material | Dimensions | Designation | Owner / administrator | Notes |
|---|---|---|---|---|---|---|---|---|---|---|
| More images | Queen Victoria | Town Hall, Leamington Spa 52.288521°N 1.535215°W | 1901 | Albert Toft | Statue | Sicilian marble on red Aberdeen granite pedestal | 3 metres (9.8 feet) high statue on a 4 metres (13 feet) high pedestal | Grade II listed | Warwick District Council and Royal Leamington Spa Town Council | There is a similar statue to this in Worcester at the Shire Hall. |
| More images | War Memorial | Parade, Leamington Spa 52.288116°N 1.534672°W | 1922 | Albert Toft | War memorial Statue | Bronze | | Grade II listed | Warwick District Council and Royal Leamington Spa Town Council | |
| More images | Firemen and a Manual Pump | RA Bennett & Partners, Euston Place, Leamington Spa 52.287891°N 1.534067°W | 1965 | | Sculpture | Metal, painted | 100 centimetres (39 inches) high x 120 centimetres (47 inches) wide, approx. | | Warwick District Council and Royal Leamington Spa Town Council | Two figures, wearing helmets and fireman's uniforms, are either side of a cart. Moved to Euston Place in 1965. It was the premises on Locke and England. The emblem was previously at 166 Parade when it was 33 Lower Parade (the firm moved there in 1875). |

=== Bath Street ===
| Image | Title / subject | Location and coordinates | Date | Artist / designer | Type | Material | Dimensions | Designation | Owner / administrator | Notes |
|---|---|---|---|---|---|---|---|---|---|---|
| More images | Spring | Church Walk, Leamington Spa 52.285871°N 1.532934°W | 2006 | Oliver Barratt | Sculpture | Metal | H 300 x W 350 x D 350 cm | | Warwickshire County Council | A continuous loop of steel, like a loosely uncoiled spring, symbolises the different interpretations of spring – water, a new direction, and a coiled spring. |

=== Regent Court ===
| Image | Title / subject | Location and coordinates | Date | Artist / designer | Type | Material | Dimensions | Designation | Owner / administrator | Notes |
|---|---|---|---|---|---|---|---|---|---|---|
| More images | The Three Graces Elephants | Livery Street, Leamington Spa 52.28998°N 1.53394°W | 2015 | Philippa Downes | Sculpture | Bronze | | | | Also called Lockhart Dancing Elephants. The Three Graces (or Charites) are mythological goddesses of charm, beauty, nature, creativity and fertility. |

=== Jephson Gardens ===
| Image | Title / subject | Location and coordinates | Date | Artist / designer | Type | Material | Dimensions | Designation | Owner / administrator | Notes |
|---|---|---|---|---|---|---|---|---|---|---|
| More images | Dr Henry Jephson | Jephson Memorial, Jephson Gardens, Leamington Spa 52.288558°N 1.530897°W | 1848 | Peter Hollins | Statue | Marble | | Grade II listed | Warwick District Council and Royal Leamington Spa Town Council | |
| More images | Elephant Circle | Jephson Gardens, Leamington Spa 52.287187°N 1.531487°W | 1988 | Nicholas Dimbleby | Sculpture | Bronze | | | Warwick District Council and Royal Leamington Spa Town Council | Originally outside the Royal Priors Shopping Centre, it was moved to Jephson Gardens in 2008. |
| | Down by the River | Royal Spa Centre, Newbold Street, Leamington Spa 52.28909°N 1.53112°W | 2022 | Spencer Jenkins | Sculpture | | | | Warwickshire County Council | Part of the Our Spaces project. A functional sculpture with seating, close to the River Leam. |
| More images | The Unknown Refugee | Jephson Gardens, Leamington Spa 52.28851°N 1.52966°W | Commissioned in 1980s, installed March 2025 | John Bridgeman | Statue | Bronze | | | Warwick District Council and Royal Leamington Spa Town Council | The artwork is a life-size bronze statue depicting a mother carrying her child, symbolizing the plight of refugees. Originally commissioned in the 1980s following the Vietnam War refugee crisis, the sculpture remained in storage for decades before finally being cast in bronze and installed in March 2025. |

== Nuneaton ==
| Image | Title / subject | Location and coordinates | Date | Artist / designer | Type | Material | Dimensions | Designation | Owner / administrator | Notes |
|---|---|---|---|---|---|---|---|---|---|---|
| More images | Mary Ann Evans (George Eliot) | Newdegate Street, Nuneaton 52.523251°N 1.467079°W | 1986 | John Letts | Statue | Bronze | Statue: 130 centimetres (51 inches) high x 120 cm wide x 120 cm deep. Plinth: 120 cm high x 120 cm wide x 120 cm deep | | Nuneaton and Bedworth Borough Council | |
| | Mary Ann Evans (George Eliot) | George Eliot Hospital, Eliot Way, Nuneaton 52.510563°N 1.476029°W | 1985 | John Letts | Statue | Bronze | Statue: 130 cm high x 100 cm wide x 100 cm deep approx. Base: 100 cm high x 120 cm wide x 120 cm deep approx. | | Nuneaton and Bedworth Borough Council | Unveiled in 1996 |
| | George Eliot Hospital Trust Logo | George Eliot Hospital, Eliot Way, Nuneaton 52.509703°N 1.475613°W | 1994 | John McKenna | Brick statue | Brick | 8 metres (26 feet) wide by 3 metres (9.8 feet)+ high | | Nuneaton and Bedworth Borough Council | The Trust logo is derived from the brick statue at the front of the hospital which represents the family surrounded by 'caring hands'. |
| More images | Boer War Memorial | Riversley Park, Nuneaton 52.519956°N 1.465913°W | 2008 | Alan Beattie Herriot | Statue | Bronze | | | Nuneaton and Bedworth Borough Council | The original memorial was unveiled in 1905 and was sculpted by Adolphus E L Rost. That was stolen in 2006. This copy was made in 2008. |

== Rugby ==
| Image | Title / subject | Location and coordinates | Date | Artist / designer | Type | Material | Dimensions | Designation | Owner / administrator | Notes |
|---|---|---|---|---|---|---|---|---|---|---|
| More images | Rupert Brooke | Jubilee Gardens, Rugby 52.374868°N 1.260501°W | 1988 | Ivor Roberts-Jones | Statue | Bronze | | | Rugby Borough Council | Poet born in Rugby. |
| | Thomas Hughes | Rugby School, Rugby | 1899 | Thomas Brock | Statue on pedestal | Stone | | | | |
| More images | William Webb Ellis | Rugby School, Rugby 52.370037°N 1.264400°W | 1997 | Graham Ibbeson | Statue | Bronze | 229 centimetres (90 inches) high | | Rugby School and Rugby Borough Council | The inventor of Rugby football in 1823. |
| | Rugby's Industrial Heritage | Side of public toilets, North Street, Rugby 52.373949°N 1.262398°W | 1999 | John McKenna | Frieze | Brick | 110 centimetres (43 inches) high x 500 centimetres (200 inches) wide | | Rugby Borough Council | Depicts Rugby's heritage, from canals to railways, to jet engines etc. |
| More images | Life Saved | Rugby Fire Station, Corporation Street, Rugby 52.374534°N 1.265352°W | 2002 | Paul Margetts | Sculpture | Mild steel | 5 metres (16 feet) high | | Rugby Borough Council | Outside Rugby Fire Station. Represents a fire fighter saving a child. |
| More images | Echo | Caldecott Park, Rugby 52.377256°N 1.262283°W | 2009 | Hilary Cartmel | Sculpture | stainless steel, bronze and cast glass | 3 metres high | | Rugby Borough Council | Replaces a Victorian sculpture that disappeared in the middle of the 20th Century. |
| More images | Frank Whittle - Father of the Jet Engine | Chestnut Fields, Park Road, Rugby 52.375076°N 1.262618°W | 2005 | Stephen Broadbent | Sculpture | Bronze | | | Rugby Borough Council | Frank Whittle did much of his research and development of the jet engine in Rugby |
| | World Rugby Hall of Fame | World Rugby Hall of Fame and Rugby Art Gallery Museum & Library, Little Elborow Street, Rugby 52.371772°N 1.264367°W | 2016 | DT Granthams Signs | Sculpture sign | | | | World Rugby Hall of Fame | In the shape of a W. |

== Stratford-upon-Avon ==
=== Town Centre ===
| Image | Title / subject | Location and coordinates | Date | Artist / designer | Type | Material | Dimensions | Designation | Owner / administrator | Notes |
|---|---|---|---|---|---|---|---|---|---|---|
| More images | Arden Quarter Mosaics | Station Approach, Stratford-upon-Avon 52.193711°N 1.715153°W | November 12, 2019 | Rob Turner | Mosaic | Unglazed ceramic mosaic tiles | 1.5m in diameter | | Stratford on Avon District Council | There is five mosaics between Stratford-upon-Avon Station at Station Square and Alcester Road, on Station Approach. Depicts the history of the town. Including: The Cattle Market, Stratford's Historic Spine, The Stratford Canal and River Avon, The original Memorial Theatre and The Riverside Heritage Trail. |
| More images | The American Fountain | Junction of Wood Street and Rother Street, Market Place, Stratford-upon-Avon 52.192880°N 1.709818°W | 1887 | Jethro Cossins & Robert Bridgeman & Sons of Lichfield | Drinking Fountain | Stone | | Grade II* listed | Stratford on Avon District Council | Donated to the people of Stratford by George W. Childs (when there was no suitable memorial to Shakespeare in England at the time) |
| More images | Sun Sphere | Stratford Leisure Centre Stratford-upon-Avon 52.194936°N 1.700350°W | | | sculpture | Steel | | | | It is on the roof, and can also be seen from the Leisure Centre Car Park |
| More images | Figure with Shield ('Everyman') | Above Shipton & Co - Sheep Street, Stratford-upon-Avon 52.191626°N 1.706620°W | 1964 | Fred J Kormis | Statue | Bronze | | | | A statue of a young man in medieval dress supporting a shield. The shield is that of the former Stratford Borough. After the local government reorganisation of 1974 the arms of the former Stratford Borough were transferred by the Earl Marshal to Stratford-upon-Avon Town Council. |
| More images | William Shakespeare | Stratford Town Hall, Sheep Street, Stratford-upon-Avon 52.19152220251014°N 1.707061271888037°W | 1769 | John Cheere | Statue | Lead | | Grade II listed | Stratford District Council | Given to the town by David Garrick in 1769. Next to Shakespeare is a head with a crown on it. He is pointing down at the school with its right hand. On the scroll is inscribed lines from A Midsummer Night's Dream. The statue was restored in 2022. |
| More images | Puck | Opposite Everyman Cinema at Bell Court, Stratford-upon-Avon 52.19220723978542°N 1.7085520434348258°W | 2017 | Louisa Forbes | Statue | Bronze | | | Bell Court | Puck was influenced by A Midsummer Night's Dream |

=== Shakespeare's Birthplace ===
| Image | Title / subject | Location and coordinates | Date | Artist / designer | Type | Material | Dimensions | Designation | Owner / administrator | Notes |
|---|---|---|---|---|---|---|---|---|---|---|
| More images | William Shakespeare | Henley Street, Stratford-upon-Avon 52.19360159441268°N 1.7077663324268388°W | 2020 | James Butler | Statue | Bronze | 8 foot | | Stratford on Avon District Council | Donated by local Stratford businessman Tony Bird OBE. Installed in July 2020 on the refurbished Henley Street. The artist made it in 2016 to commemorate the 400th anniversary of the Bard's death but it took four years to find a permanent home. |
| | The Stratford Jester | Henley Street, Stratford-upon-Avon 52.194412°N 1.709096°W | 1994 | James Walter Butler | Statue | Bronze | | | Stratford on Avon District Council | The character of the jester or fool appears in many of Shakespeare's plays |
| | Untitled Abstract Relief | The Shakespeare Centre, Henley Street, Stratford-upon-Avon 52.194060°N 1.708309°W | 1964 | Douglas Wain Hobson | Relief | Bronze | 150cm high x 200cm wide x 35cm deep approx. | | Shakespeare Birthplace Trust | The sculptor intended to represent Shakespeare's greatness. |
| | Eagle | The Shakespeare Centre, Henley Street, Stratford-upon-Avon 52.194048°N 1.708344°W | 1964 | | Sculpture | Bronze | | | Shakespeare Birthplace Trust | |

=== Bancroft Gardens ===
| Image | Title / subject | Location and coordinates | Date | Artist / designer | Type | Material | Dimensions | Designation | Owner / administrator | Notes |
|---|---|---|---|---|---|---|---|---|---|---|
| More images | The Gower Memorial | Bancroft Gardens, Stratford-upon-Avon 52.192148°N 1.702385°W | 1876 | Ronald Gower | Statue | Bronze | | Grade II* listed | Stratford on Avon District Council | Statue of William Shakespeare surrounded by characters from his plays. Unveiled in 1888. It was outside the Royal Shakespeare Theatre until it burned down in 1926. It was moved to its present site in 1933. |
| More images | William Shakespeare | Bancroft Gardens, Stratford-upon-Avon 52.191354°N 1.703242°W | 2016 | Lawrence Holofcener | Statue | Bronze | | | Stratford on Avon District Council | The American artist gave the statue to the town to mark the 400th anniversary of the Bard's death |
| More images | Hermaphroditus or Youth at the Stream | Bancroft Gardens, Stratford-upon-Avon 52.191872°N 1.703578°W | 1844 | John Henry Foley | Statue | Bronze | | | Stratford on Avon District Council | Cast in bronze by J.A. Hatfield in 1851 for the Great Exhibition. Alfred Bullard donated it to Bancroft Gardens in 1932. |
| More images | Country Artists Fountain | Bancroft Gardens, Stratford-upon-Avon 52.191529°N 1.703748°W | 1996 | Christine Lee | Fountain | Marble and Stainless Steel | 450cm high x 250cm wide x 250cm deep | | Stratford on Avon District Council | Commemorates the 800th anniversary of the granting of market rights to the town of Stratford-upon-Avon by Richard I. |
| | Peace Memorial | Bancroft Gardens, Stratford-upon-Avon 52.191374°N 1.702429°W | 1995 | Hornton Quarries, Brent Hayward with Darren Hayward, Trevor Brown and Naomi Hamer. | Sculpture | Hornton Stone (Limestone with Iron content). | 250cm high x 87cm wide x 23cm deep x other dimensions (irregular shape) | | Stratford on Avon District Council | Marked 50 years of peace since the end of World War Two in Europe in 1995 |

=== Recreation Ground ===
| Image | Title / subject | Location and coordinates | Date | Artist / designer | Type | Material | Dimensions | Designation | Owner / administrator | Notes |
|---|---|---|---|---|---|---|---|---|---|---|
| More images | We Shadows | Receation Ground, Stratford-upon-Avon 52.18673°N 1.70138°W | July 2022 | Ruby Road Collective (Red Isaac & Sarah Annis, with Clare Pentlow) | Sculpture | | | | Warwickshire County Council | A multi-use intervention at the Stratford Recreation Ground, also known as 'The Rec'. It was placed near the then new natural play area and tennis courts. It was part of the Our Spaces initiative. |

=== Bishopton ===
| Image | Title / subject | Location and coordinates | Date | Artist / designer | Type | Material | Dimensions | Designation | Owner / administrator | Notes |
|---|---|---|---|---|---|---|---|---|---|---|
| More images | Fire Fighters Memorial | Memorial Garden, Stratford-upon-Avon Fire Station - Masons Road, Stratford-upon-Avon 52.19542°N 1.71942°W | November 2, 2007 | | Statue | | | | Warwickshire Fire & Rescue Service | The garden is dedicated to the memory of the four Warwickshire Fire and Rescue Service firemen who died after part of a structure collapsed while they were members of a large team of firefighters tackling a major fire at Atherstone on Stour on November 2nd 2007. |
| | Brick Relief of a Fireman | East wall of Stratford-upon-Avon Fire Station - Masons Road, Stratford-upon-Avon 52.19498°N 1.71935°W | 1951 | Walter Ritchie | Relief | Brick | | | Warwickshire Fire & Rescue Service | It depicts a single fireman in profile, holding a hose. The "sunken" nature of the carving (intaglio) means the highlights and shadows change throughout the day as the sun moves across the brickwork. |

=== Stratford roundabouts ===
| Image | Title / subject | Location and coordinates | Date | Artist / designer | Type | Material | Dimensions | Designation | Owner / administrator | Notes |
|---|---|---|---|---|---|---|---|---|---|---|
| More images | Henry V | Rosebird roundabout, Stratford-upon-Avon 52.179193483149255°N 1.7007272330098941°W | 2019 | John Blakeley | Statue | Bronze | | | Stratford on Avon District Council | Used to be at the Maybird Centre from the early 1990s until 2013. Tony Bird owner of both the Maybird and Rosebird Centre's had hoped to have the statue relocated to an island, as a gateway to Shakespeare's Stratford. It was installed at the Rosebird roundabout near the Rosebird Centre during November 2019, the sword was added shortly afterwards |
| More images | Armillary Sphere | Banbury Road / Trinity Way Roundabout, Stratford-upon-Avon 52.180791°N 1.683393°W | 2007 | Mark Renn & Mick Thacker | Sculpture | Corten Steel | | | Stratford on Avon District Council | A modern "model of the universe" commissioned via Section 106 developer funds. A giant sized armillary sundial is sunken into the middle of the roundabout and is illuminated at night, acting as a navigational landmark. Heavily damaged in a vehicle collision in June 2026, sparking local debate over its repair or removal. |

== Studley ==
| Image | Title / subject | Location and coordinates | Date | Artist / designer | Type | Material | Dimensions | Designation | Owner / administrator | Notes |
|---|---|---|---|---|---|---|---|---|---|---|
| | Needles | Studley Island, Studley 52.274596°N 1.894700°W | | Planet Art | Sculpture | Mild steel | 3m x 3m | | Studley Parish Council | A centre piece for Studley Island. Uses the heritage of the town's needle making industry |

== Warwick ==
| Image | Title / subject | Location and coordinates | Date | Artist / designer | Type | Material | Dimensions | Designation | Owner / administrator | Notes |
|---|---|---|---|---|---|---|---|---|---|---|
| More images | Guy and the Boar | Traffic island, Coventry Road, Warwick 52.289798°N 1.578960°W | 1964 | Keith Godwin | Statue | Cast concrete, set on a stone plinth and concrete base | | | Warwick District Council | Depicts Guy of Warwick. Commissioned by the Annol Development Company and presented to Warwick Council. |
| | Randolph Turpin | Market Place, Warwick 52.281969°N 1.590978°W | 2001 | Carl Payne | Statue | Bronze | | | Warwick District Council | |
| More images | The Herons and Fishes | Warwickshire County Council, Market Place, Warwick 52.282571°N 1.590355°W | 2000 | Rachel Higgins | Sculpture | Steel | | | Warwick District Council | Millennium pond sculpture. It reflects the rich wildlife of Warwickshire |
