= South Warwickshire University NHS Foundation Trust =

South Warwickshire University NHS Foundation Trust, formerly South Warwickshire NHS Foundation Trust, manages four hospitals, Warwick Hospital, Stratford Hospital, Leamington Spa Hospital and Ellen Badger Hospital.

The trust agreed a package of support for the financially troubled George Eliot Hospital NHS Trust in August 2014 although its bid to take over the organisation was rejected.

In July 2017, it agreed to set up a "foundation group" to create twin Accountable care organizations with Wye Valley NHS Trust, though there does not appear to be any plan to merge the two trusts.

== Performance ==
In October 2013, the trust was praised for spending more on food for in-patients - £14.04 per day than other trusts, and for lower rates of food wastage.

It was named by the Health Service Journal as one of the top hundred NHS trusts to work for in 2015. At that time it had 3444 full-time equivalent staff and a sickness absence rate of 4.14%. 73% of staff recommend it as a place for treatment and 71% recommended it as a place to work. The trust spent £11 million on agency staff in 2014/5.

It was rated ‘outstanding’ by the Care Quality Commission in December 2019.

== Stratford ==
Circle Clinic, attached to a GP practice in Stratford on Avon was established by Circle Clinics Limited in 2011 but in June 2014 it was announced that SWFT Clinical Services, a subsidiary of the Trust, was to take it over as Circle had stopped providing services at the clinic. SWFT Clinical Services was the first FT subsidiary company when it was set up in 2011, initially established so the trust could reclaim VAT charges on outpatient drugs, as Trusts can claim tax exemptions when entering into contracts with third parties to operate dispensaries.

In August 2014, it emerged that the Trust was exploring a number of projects to assist the struggling George Eliot Hospital.

The Trust developed Stratford Hospital with cancer and an eye ward built at the site of the existing hospital on Arden Street at a cost of £22 million. This was partly financed by a Section 106 agreement with Coventry City Council, based on increased service demand from residents in new development, a £1,500 levy on each new dwelling in a large residential development. This is thought to be the first time such an agreement has been used by the NHS.

== Primary Care ==
The trust signed a memorandum of understanding with South Warwickshire GP Ltd – a federation of 35 GP practices - in August 2015 with the intention to establish an accountable care organisation which would provide primary, community and acute care to the local population.

== See also ==
- List of NHS trusts
