= Hitchman =

Hitchman is an English-language surname. Notable people with the surname include:

- Alan Hitchman (1903–1980), English civil servant
- Janet Hitchman (1916–1980), British writer
- John Hitchman (1805–1867), English surgeon and philanthropist
- Lionel Hitchman (1901–1969), Canadian ice hockey player
- Melissa Hitchman, Australian ambassador
- William Hitchman (1830–1900), American politician
