= Museji Takolia =

Museji Ahmed Takolia CBE has served in public and government service. His main business interest is as a strategic adviser to Intellicomm Solutions Private Ltd (India). He was the chairman of Wye Valley NHS Trust from June 2014 to October 2016, when he resigned. He was appointed chair of the Pensions Advisory Service in February 2016. He was formerly group chairman of the Metropolitan Housing Partnership, a non-executive director of the schools regulator Ofsted, a senior civil servant in the Cabinet Office, and a board member of the Commission for Health Improvement. He was appointed a CBE during the 2011 New Year Honours for services toward Diversity and Equal Opportunities.

== Early life and education ==
Museji was born in 1960 in Coventry, England. He is the son of Indian immigrant Ahmed Suleman Takolia from the Jalalpur village near Navsari, Gujarat.

== Public and government service ==
Museji has served in many fields of public policy, advising on national policy developments in education (national reports on Muslim Education in the UK and Muslim Youth for the British Muslim Research Centre) and thereafter as a Secretary of State (Department of Education) appointee to the Board of the schools' regulator OFSTED. In the health field, he was appointed by the Secretary of State at the Department of Health to the board of the first inspector/regulator of the NHS in England – the Commission for Health Improvement (CHI). He also served as a non-executive director on the Board of his local Gloucestershire Hospitals NHS Foundation Trust, and as chairman of the Wye Valley NHS Trust, which was taken out of Special measure under his leadership. Besides this he served for five years as chair of the Consumer/Members' Panel of the National Employment Savings Trust (NEST) Corporation Pension Scheme delivering annual reports to the Secretary of State on the performance of this new intervention through auto-enrollment of workers. The reports of his Panel laid the foundation for stronger consumer focus and protection in auto-enrollment. His growing consumer champion credentials were recognized when Ian Duncan Smith, MP, Secretary of State at the Department for Work and Pensions (DWP), appointed him to chair The Pensions Advisory Service (TPAS). A position he held for less than a year, resigning after failing to resolve a personal business matter that led to bankruptcy.

Museji's community work started with the highly innovative community enterprise in Bristol, the St Paul 's-based Center for Employment and Enterprise Development (Charity) Limited. He went on to serve on the advisory board of 'The Smart Company', later part of Chime Communications, and specialized in giving companies advice on corporate social responsibility where he served alongside Sir. Derek Wanless and Harriet Harman MP. In 1993, he was awarded the prestigious Commonwealth Fund Harkness Fellowship.

=== The NHS: its costs and value ===
Having served on the board of the national regulator of the NHS in England and two local NHS Trust boards, Museji identifies the NHS in England as a victim of its success. He was asked to lead the Wye Valley Trust during tough periods of the NHS. With huge cost pressures facing the NHS, he entered the national debate about its cost and value by writing about how the NHS could save money. Faced with turning around a failing hospital, these challenges came into sharp focus. In 2015, writing jointly with the local MP for Hereford, Jesse Norman, he co-authored an article published by the Center for Policy Studies, "How Much Do We Use the NHS?" (Ref). In October 2016, shortly after his resignation, Wye Valley NHS Trust was taken out of "Special Measures" by the Care Quality Commission.

== Social housing and community building ==
His Harkness Fellowship focused on American Community Development Corporations (CDCs). This inspired his vision for taking what he had started building with the CEED Charity in Bristol to apply a similar partnership model in the UK. After a period as special adviser to the president of the Local Initiatives Support Corporation (LISC) in New York, during which time he was a member of a US delegation to No. 10 Downing Street, he moved onto the national stage in the UK when he was appointed group chairman of the Metropolitan Housing Partnership or MHP in 2003.

== Muslim affairs ==
Museji has served as an adviser to the government, including to the cabinet secretary and successive secretaries-general of the Muslim Council of Britain (MCB). He was listed in the first 'Muslim Power 100' list published in 2007.

Museji also advised on the implementation of the fledgling peace process in Northern Ireland (writing plans for and evaluating EU spending on rural communities), on urban planning and employment equity legislation in the Cape Metropolitan area of South Africa, and finally, helped the FCO as a delegate on its international public diplomacy missions to Libya and India. In this latter context, he has been called upon periodically to offer advice periodically on Muslim affairs in the UK. As a relatively widely traveled liberal Muslim, he has garnered broad perspectives and insights on developments at home and abroad. Expressing concerns about current government policy on British Muslims he has written thought-provoking blogs for the UK Huffington Post following the Trojan horse affair in Birmingham, and latterly about the need for more tolerance as intra-ethnic politics from the Indian sub-continent creeps its way into British Asian communities.

== Business affairs ==
Since 2009, he has been executive chairman of Intellicomm Solutions Limited. The business has grown and diversified from IT to travel services in the Indian market, operating successfully from Bangalore. He remains a strategic adviser. This company was dissolved in 2017.

Between 2010 and 2016, he held various directorships from which he has now resigned, notably Invest Eq Property Management Partners Ltd, Mill House (General Buildings) LLP, and Liver Homes (General Buildings) LLP. Museji was petitioned for bankruptcy following failed property investments.

== Personal life ==
Museji married Noorjehan Ebrahim in 1987. They divorced in 2006 and have three children - Nadiya, Firdaus, and Zainudeen. He lives in Gloucester.
