= Leamington Spa Hospital =

Hospital in Warwick, Warwickshire, England

- South Warwickshire University NHS Foundation Trust
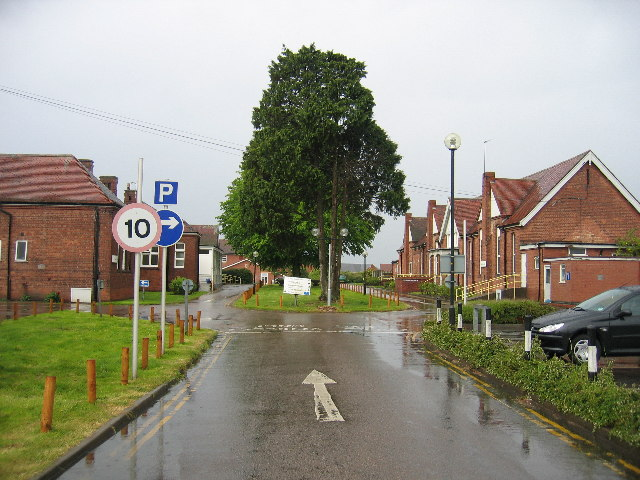
- Leamington Spa Hospital

- Shown in Warwickshire

Geography
- Location: Warwick, Warwickshire, England
- Coordinates: 52.2695°N 1.5407°W

Organisation
- Care system: NHS
- Type: Rehabilitation

History
- Founded: 1887

Links
- Lists: Hospitals in England

Leamington Spa Hospital is located on Heathcote Lane in Warwick, Warwickshire, in England. Originally an isolation hospital, it is now a hospital run by South Warwickshire University NHS Foundation Trust specialising in rehabilitation.

== History ==
The facility was established as an isolation hospital for treating contagious diseases known as Heathcote Hospital in 1887. A nurses' home was built 1937. The hospital started to focus specifically on tuberculosis cases in 1952 and was converted for use as a geriatric hospital in 1959.

In the early 21st century steps were taken to convert the buildings for use as a rehabilitation centre. Feldon Ward, which was refurbished for use as a state-of-the-art stroke unit, re-opened in 2006. Campion and Chadwick Wards, which form the core of the new rehabilitation hospital, were similarly refurbished and officially opened by the Princess Royal on 29 January 2015.

== See also ==
- List of hospitals in England
