= Hull University Teaching Hospitals NHS Trust =

UK NHS trust

Hull University Teaching Hospital NHS Foundation Trust
- Type: NHS hospital trust
- Headquarters: Hull
- Region served: East Riding of Yorkshire
- Hospitals: Hull Royal Infirmary; Castle Hill Hospital
- Chair: Alan Downey
- Chief executive: Lyn Simpson
- Website: www.hull.nhs.uk

The Hull University Teaching Hospitals NHS Trust operates in the city of Hull and the East Riding of Yorkshire, England. The Trust was formed on 1 October 1999 by the merger of the East Yorkshire Hospitals and the Royal Hull Hospitals National Health Service Trusts.

It is based on two sites, Hull Royal Infirmary and Castle Hill Hospital. The Trust is in the top five largest trusts in England and provides acute care for a local population of 600,000 and over 1.2 million people for tertiary services.

The Trust employs over 8,500 people and has an annual turnover of over £500 million. It changed its name from Hull and East Yorkshire Hospitals NHS Trust to Hull University Teaching Hospitals NHS Trust in 2019.

== Digitisation ==
The Trust is one of a small number implementing the Lorenzo patient record systems having accepted a financial support package. The Trust's risk register in May 2014 said plans to deploy Lorenzo patient record systems might be "unrealistic", and that it had "insufficient capacity and insufficient funding" to support the project.

== Performance ==
In November 2013 Diabetes UK complained that the diabetes-related amputation rate in Hull and the East Riding is one of the highest in the country and that only 30.4 per cent of inpatients with diabetes at the Trust have their feet assessed.

The Care Quality Commission published an extensive report on the Trust in May 2014 which found shortage of staff in several areas, "Some staff felt pressure to meet performance targets and spoke of a bullying culture in some areas." A report by Acas in October 2014 recounted that employees interviewed reported "aggressive behaviour", including being "pushed and prodded", having staff put a hand in their face to stop them speaking, and being called "incompetent, underperforming, useless, thick and dopey". Examples were also produced of staff being refused compassionate leave to be with their sick or dying close relatives, and many staff said that the sickness policy was "used as a weapon".

The trust was the biggest single contributor to the national growth in patients waiting more than four hours in accident and emergency over the 2014/5 winter. It missed the target for 20,400 patients up from 6,000 in 2013–14. This meant its performance against the target to treat or discharge 95 per cent of patients within four hours of attendance fell from 95% to 84%. The trust cancelled 526 operations at the last minute for non-clinical reasons between January and March 2015 – the second highest number of any trust in England.

In the last quarter of 2015 it had one of the worst performances of any hospital in England against the four hour waiting target.

In October 2017 it had to close a ward at Castle Hill Hospital because of a shortage of nurses. The trust was recruiting 20 nurses from the Philippines.

== See also ==
- List of NHS trusts
