= Ellen Badger Hospital =

- South Warwickshire NHS Foundation Trust
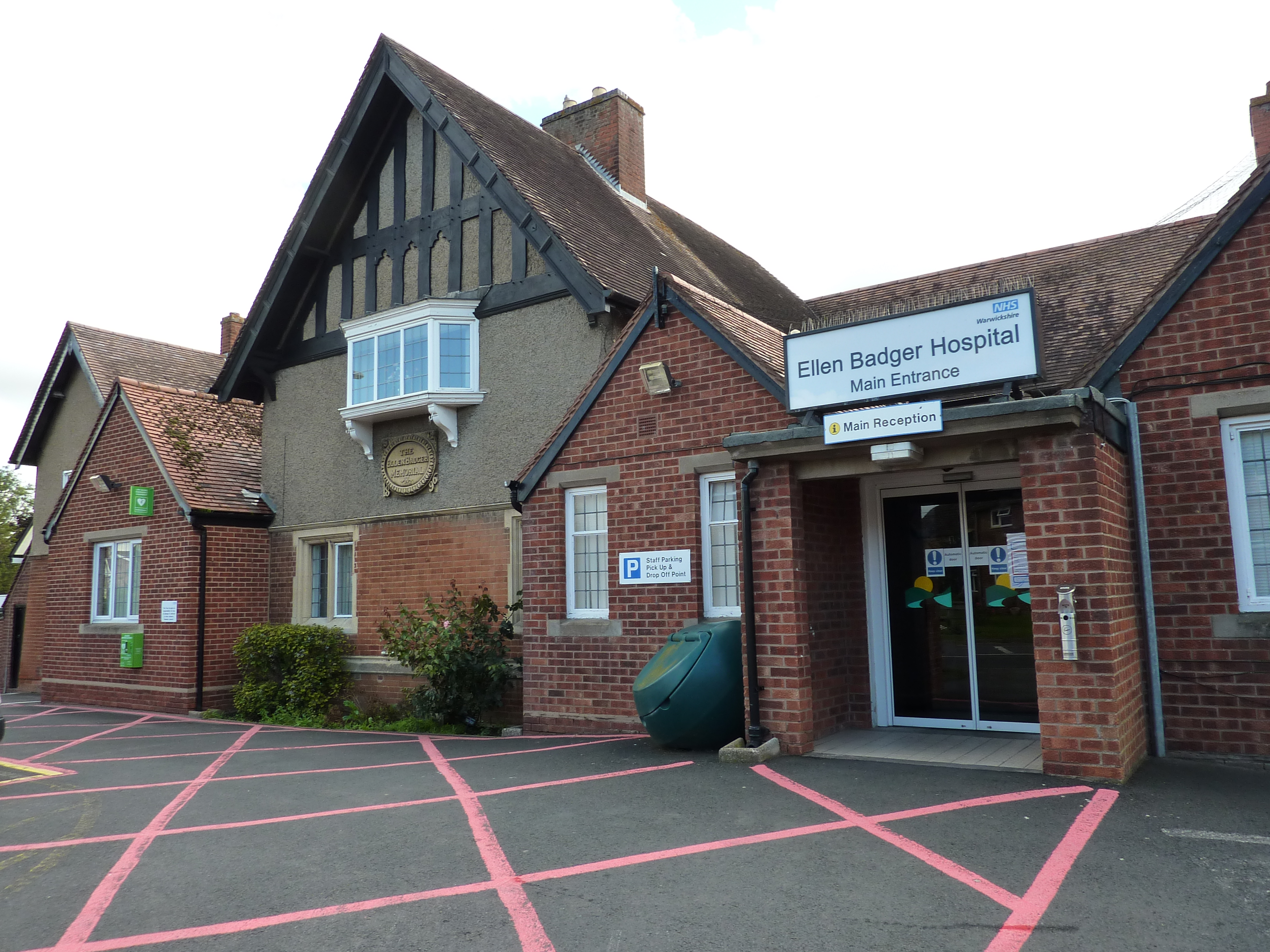
- Ellen Badger Hospital, seen in August 2012

- Shown in Warwickshire

Geography
- Location: Shipston-on-Stour, Warwickshire, United Kingdom
- Coordinates: 52.0668°N 1.6228°W

Organisation
- Care system: National Health Service
- Type: Community

Services
- Emergency department: No Accident & Emergency

History
- Founded: 1896

Links
- Website: www.swft.nhs.uk/our-hospitals/ellen-badger-hospital
- Lists: Hospitals in the United Kingdom

The Ellen Badger is a small community NHS hospital located within the town of Shipston-on-Stour in Warwickshire, England. It is operated by South Warwickshire NHS Foundation Trust.

== History ==
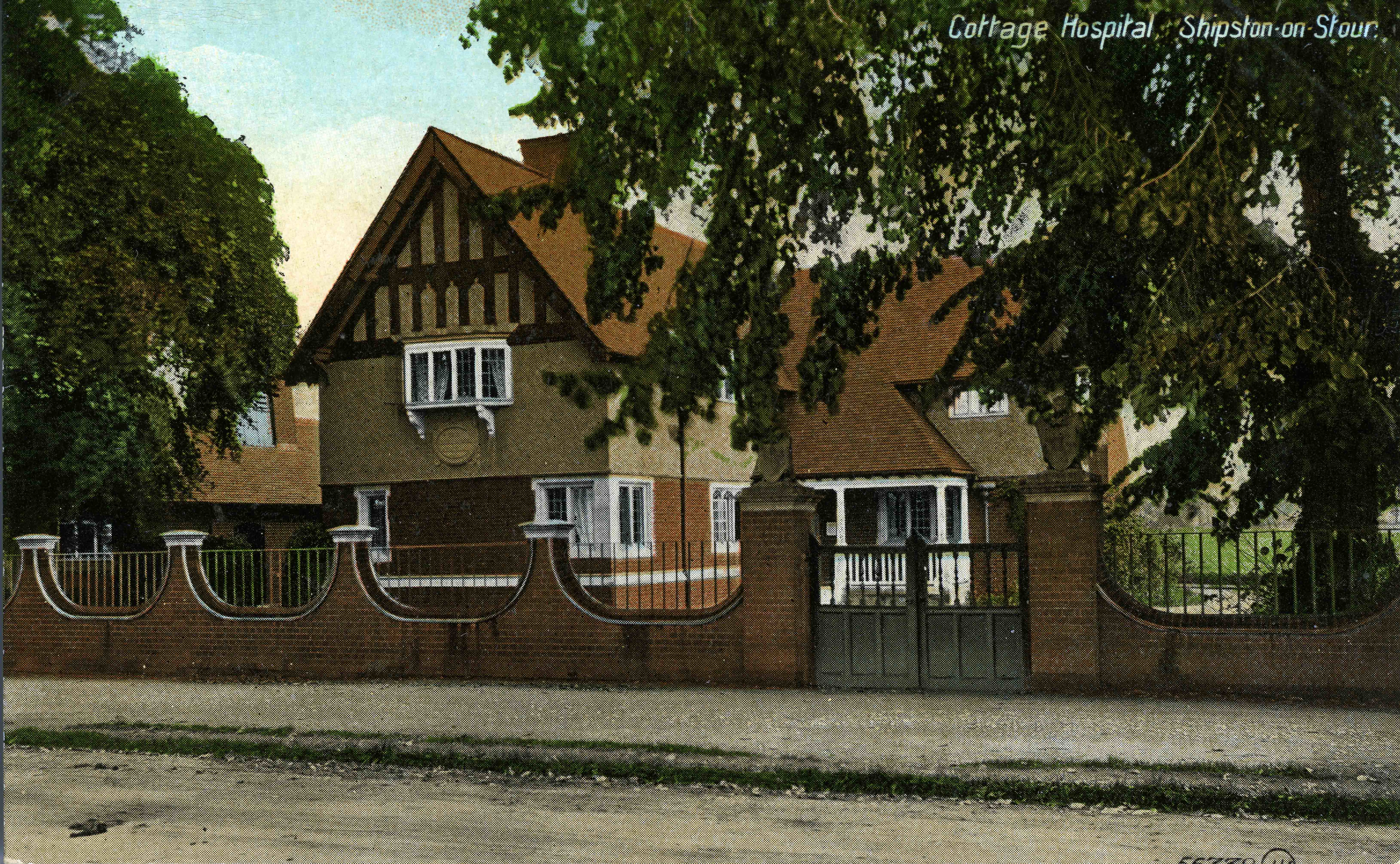
The hospital before expansion, on a postcard dated 1914

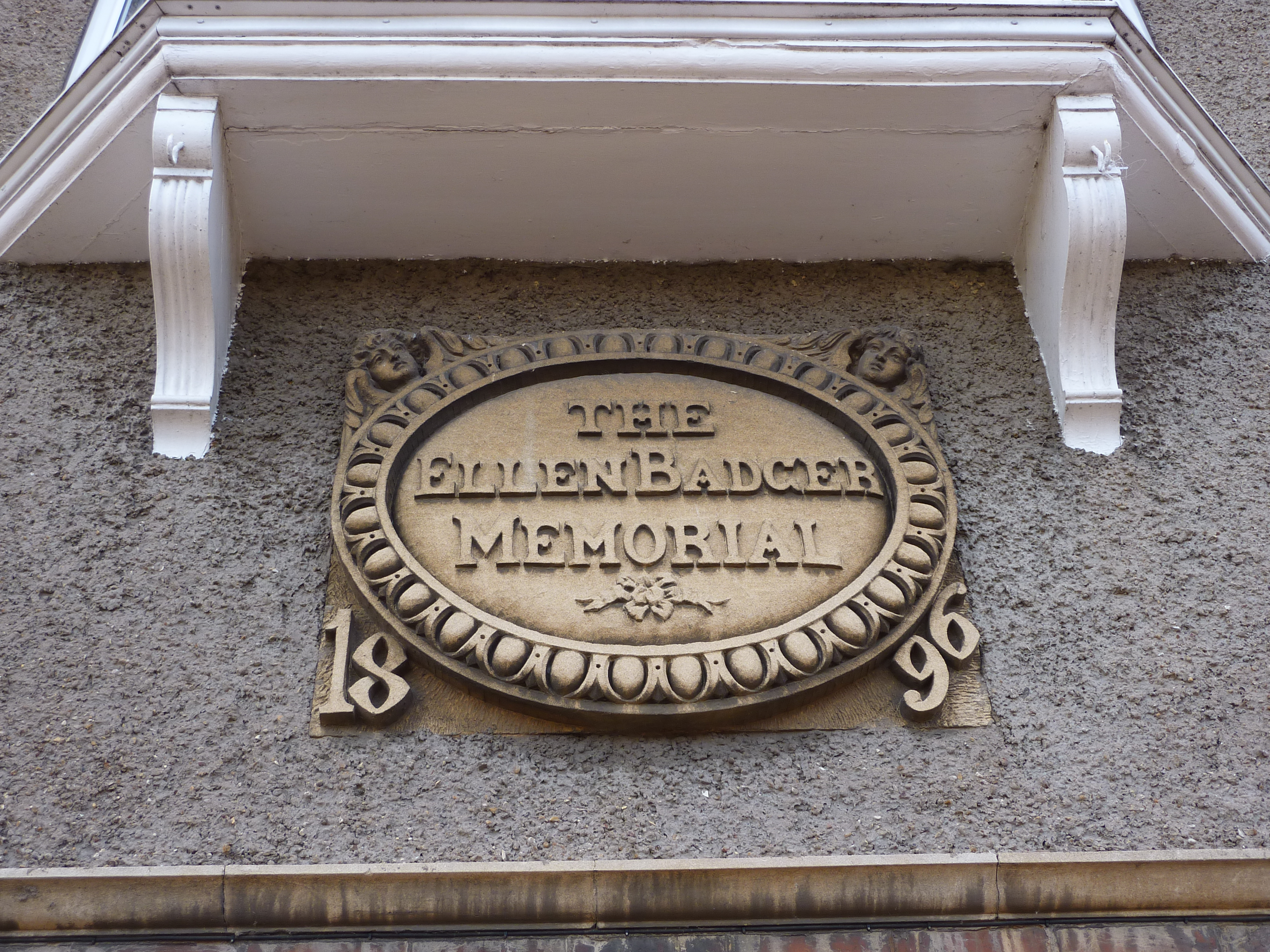
Memorial plaque commemorating Ellen Badger

The hospital was built in 1896 to a design by Edward William Mountford. It was endowed by the local wine merchant Richard Badger, and named by him in memory of his wife. The street opposite the hospital's main frontage was named Badgers Crescent. The old hospital was demolished in 2022. It was replaced by an outpatient facility with no beds.

== See also ==
- List of hospitals in England
