= Hereford County Hospital =

- Wye Valley NHS Trust
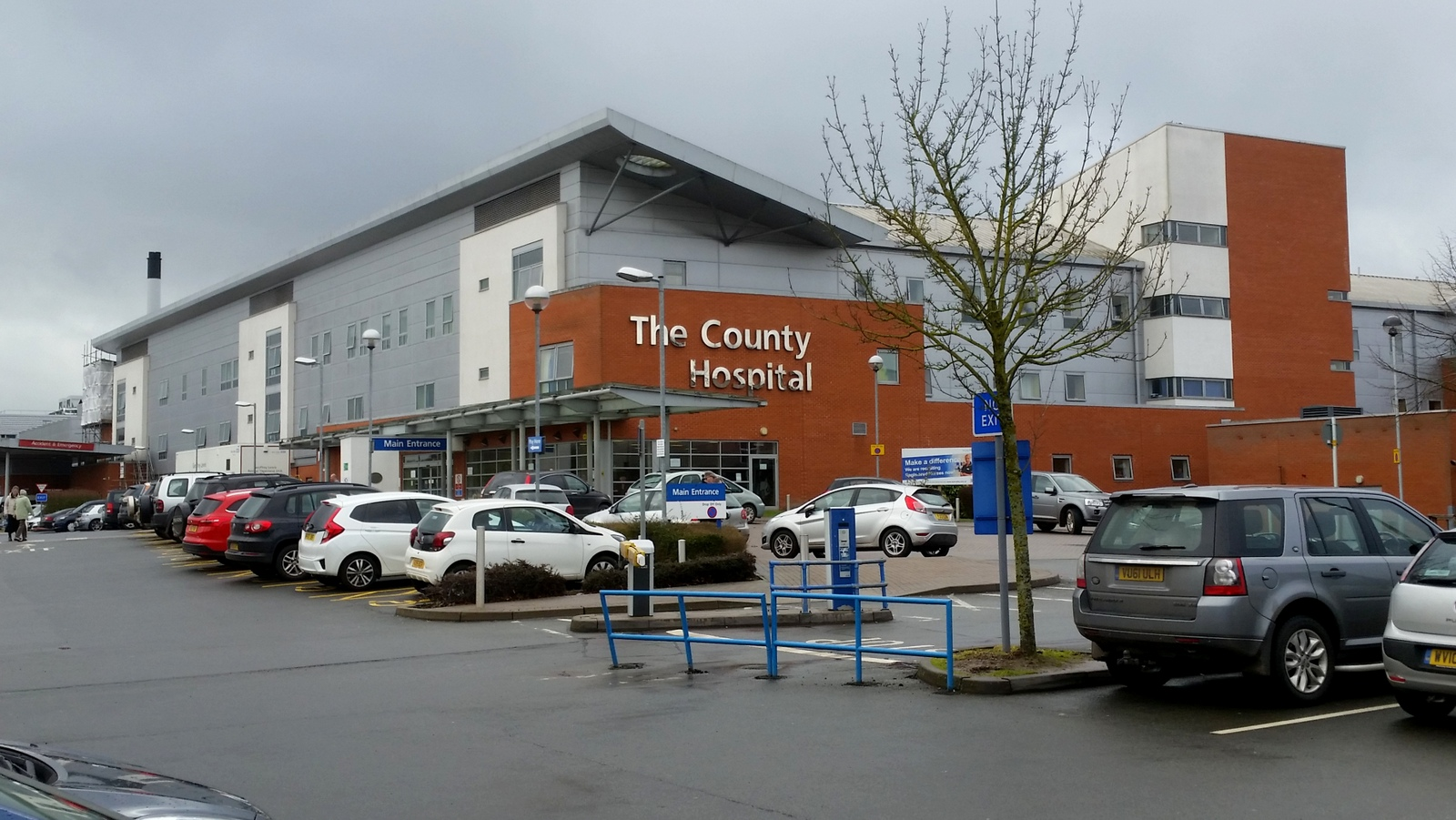
- Hereford County Hospital

- Shown in Herefordshire

Geography
- Location: Stonebow Road, Hereford, England, United Kingdom
- Coordinates: 52.05691°N 2.70553°W

Organisation
- Care system: NHS
- Type: General

Services
- Emergency department: Yes Accident & Emergency
- Beds: 236

History
- Founded: 1937 (rebuilt 2002)

Links
- Website: www.wyevalley.nhs.uk
- Lists: Hospitals in England

Hereford County Hospital is an acute general hospital on Stonebow Road in Hereford. It is managed by Wye Valley NHS Trust.

== History ==
The foundation stone for Hereford County Hospital was laid in 1937 by Queen Mary. It was built adjacent to the site of the Public Assistance Institute. By 1946 the County Hospital provided 142 beds of which 25 were maternity beds.

A new hospital was procured in 1999 under a Private Finance Initiative contract to replace the old Hereford County Hospital, the Hereford General Hospital and the Victoria Eye Hospital. The new hospital, which was designed by WS Atkins and built by Alfred McAlpine at a cost of £62 million, opened in 2002. At the time concerns were expressed that the new hospital was too small to replace the facilities which were being lost. Consequently an additional ward, the Gilwern Assessment Unit, opened on the site in December 2015 providing an acute geriatric assessment unit. This was followed by a 24 bed medical assessment unit in November 2018.

In 2020 construction began on a new three storey block to replace the ageing Nightingale style Canadian Huts built in the aftermath of the Second World War. The new facility will provide 72 new inpatient beds and allow the hutted wards to be demolished. Concurrent works to expand the intensive care bed base from six to eight beds were also commenced. In all the new works will expand the bed base to approximately 272 by 2021.

== Facilities ==
The hospital has 236 beds. The site also houses the Stonebow Mental Health hospital which includes a psychiatric ward named after Jenny Lind, a Swedish opera singer. Facilities management services are provided by Sodexo.

Kier Group has a contract for a £40m programme of reconfiguration works at the hospital.
