= Lorenzo (electronic health record) =

Electronic health record

Lorenzo is a controversial Electronic Health Record (EHR) Platform by DXC Technology, originally designed in the early 2010s as part of the National Programme for IT in the NHS.

Lorenzo was deployed across more than 20 NHS trusts across the United Kingdom between 2010 and 2015. However, as of 2020, many trusts are attempting to procure replacement services.

Lorenzo had a mixed reception, and has faced significant criticism as a platform. NHS reviews and coroner investigations have found the system responsible for numerous adverse patient events.

== Initial procurement & launch ==
In 2010, the NHS and DXC initiated negotiations for a new "whole-of-system" Electronic Health Record (EHR). There was already significant negotiation history between the NHS and DXC.

In June 2010, the University Hospitals of Morecambe Bay NHS Foundation Trust were the first to deploy Lorenzo 1.9.

In June 2012, Humber NHS Foundation Trust were the first mental health organisation to use Lorenzo.

On 4 September 2012, the UK Department of Health and Social Care announced that, despite actively "dismantling" the National Programme for IT, Lorenzo would be supplied under a fresh Standing Order Agreement (SOA).

This SOA facilitated negotiation between the NHS and its providers, creating a potential line-of-purchase for highly profitable data covering most UK citizens.

In 2013, George Eliot Hospital NHS Trust, Ipswich Hospital NHS Trust, Tameside Hospital NHS Foundation Trust and Hull and East Yorkshire Hospitals NHS Trust also implemented Lorenzo under a financial support package described as controversial.

In May 2014, delays in the provision of data to NHS England's waiting list system were linked to Lorenzo implementations in an HSJ article.

In 2015, Lorenzo systems were introduced to Warrington & Halton Hospitals NHS Foundation Trust, Hull and East Yorkshire Hospitals NHS Trust, and Norfolk and Suffolk NHS Foundation Trust.

In July 2015, Digital Health Intelligence formally reported that DXC stated 19 NHS Trusts were currently contracted to Lorenzo.

November 2015, North Bristol NHS Trust was the first NHS trust in the South of England to purchase Lorenzo as part of an open procurement exercise outside of DXC's usual NHS negotiations, when it replaced its Cerner system with Lorenzo.

In May 2017, Mid Essex Hospital Services NHS Trust installed Lorenzo.

In 2018, DXC received £10 million as part of a national “digital exemplar” programme for the National Programme for IT.

Royal Papworth Hospital NHS Foundation Trust, Hull and East Yorkshire Hospitals NHS Trust, North Staffordshire Combined Healthcare NHS Trust and Warrington and Halton Hospitals NHS Foundation Trust were to be the exemplars maximising the potential benefits of using electronic patient records.

== NHS trusts leaving Lorenzo ==
In July 2020, Barnsley Hospital NHS Foundation Trust switched its electronic patient record from the Lorenzo system to System C’s Careflow.

Walsall Healthcare NHS Trust was reported to soon be doing the same.

Others of the 20 trusts which installed Lorenzo systems as part of the National Programme for IT are in the process of launching procurements for new systems.

Sheffield Teaching Hospitals use Lorenzo, and have experienced problems with its implementation.
