= George Eliot Hospital NHS Trust =

NHS hospital trust

Geography
- Location: Nuneaton, Warwickshire, England
- Coordinates: 52.512191°N 1.475271°W

Links
- Website: www.geh.nhs.uk
- Lists: Hospitals in England

The George Eliot Hospital NHS Trust runs George Eliot Hospital in Nuneaton, Warwickshire, England and the Urgent Care Centre at Leicester Royal Infirmary.

== History ==
In October 2013, as a result of the Keogh Review, the trust was put into the highest risk category by the Care Quality Commission. It was put into a buddying arrangement with University Hospitals Birmingham NHS Foundation Trust.

The NHS Trust Development Authority initiated a competitive process to identify an organisation to take over the trust in 2012 but stopped the competition in March 2014 after the Trust got a "good" Care Quality Commission rating. South Warwickshire NHS Foundation Trust, University Hospitals Coventry and Warwickshire NHS Trust, Circle Health and Care UK were all considered. The costs of this exercise to NHS bodies amounted to £1.78 million. The George Eliot trust spent £426,000 on legal advice and support, £358,000 on financial advice and support, and £434,000 on procurement advice and project management.

In August 2014 it emerged that the Trust was exploring a number of projects led by South Warwickshire NHS Foundation Trust. In 2018 it became part of a three-trust hospital chain with South Warwickshire and Wye Valley NHS Trust.

In 2019 it implemented a programme to become paperless using Alfresco Software.

In October 2022 it terminated the otorhinolaryngology contract with University Hospitals Coventry and Warwickshire NHS Trust after long delays were reported.

== Performance ==
The Trust forecast a £12 million deficit in 2014/5.

It spent 11.2% of its total turnover on agency staff in that year.

== See also ==
- List of NHS trusts
