= Hereford General Hospital =

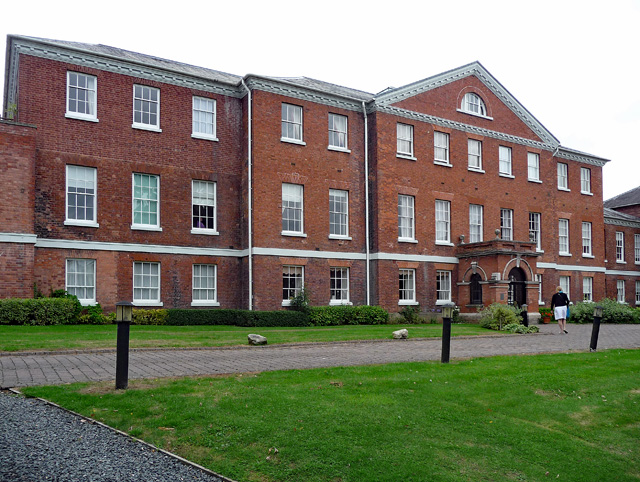

- Shown in Herefordshire

Geography
- Location: Nelson Street, Hereford, England, United Kingdom
- Coordinates: 52.0506°N 2.7107°W

Organisation
- Care system: NHS
- Type: General

History
- Founded: 1783
- Closed: 2002

Links
- Lists: Hospitals in England

Hereford General Hospital was a health facility located on Nelson Street in Hereford. The main building, which has since been converted into apartments, remains a Grade II listed building.

== History ==
The facility was founded by the Rev Thomas Talbot who launched a subscription to fund a hospital in 1775. A hospital opened in a temporary building in Eign Street in 1776.

The permanent hospital was built on land donated by the Earl of Oxford and was designed by William Parker. It opened as the Hereford General Infirmary in 1783. An asylum, designed by John Nash, was added in the 1790s with 20 cells. In 1847 this was replaced by a purpose-built asylum in Abergavenny.

The General Infirmary was extended in 1783 with two new wards taking its capacity up to 60 patients and further extended when a children's ward was opened in 1887. It became known as the Hereford General Hospital in 1900 and an additional building, known as the Hewat Pavilion, which operated as an orthopedic ward, opened in 1927. By 1946 it had 127 beds of which five were maternity beds.

It joined the National Health Service in 1948. After services transferred to the new Hereford County Hospital in 2002, the Hereford General Hospital closed and has since been converted into apartments.
