= Stratford Hospital =

- South Warwickshire NHS Foundation Trust
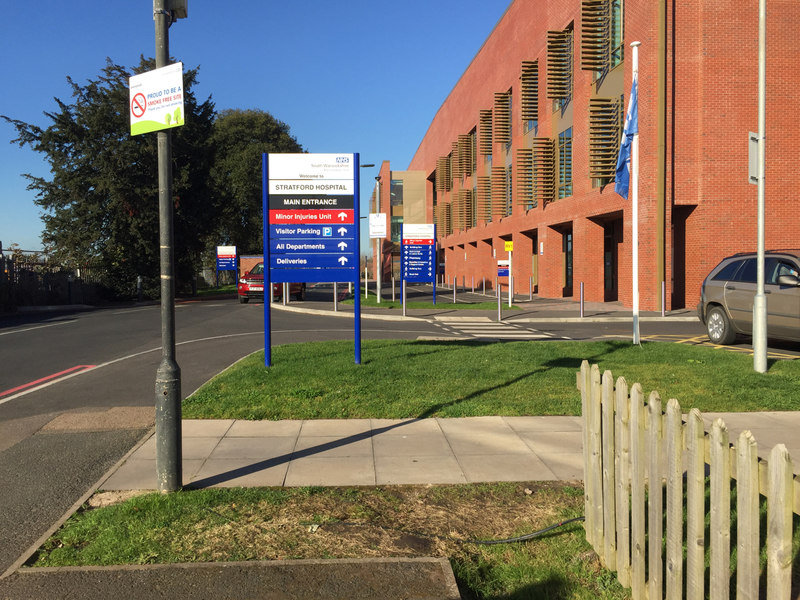
- The new Stratford Hospital facilities

Geography
- Location: Arden Street, Stratford-upon-Avon, Warwickshire, England
- Coordinates: 52.1952°N 1.7136°W

Organisation
- Care system: National Health Service
- Type: General

History
- Founded: 1823; 203 years ago

Links
- Lists: Hospitals in England

Stratford Hospital is a health facility on Arden Street, Stratford-upon-Avon, Warwickshire, England. It is managed by South Warwickshire NHS Foundation Trust.

== History ==
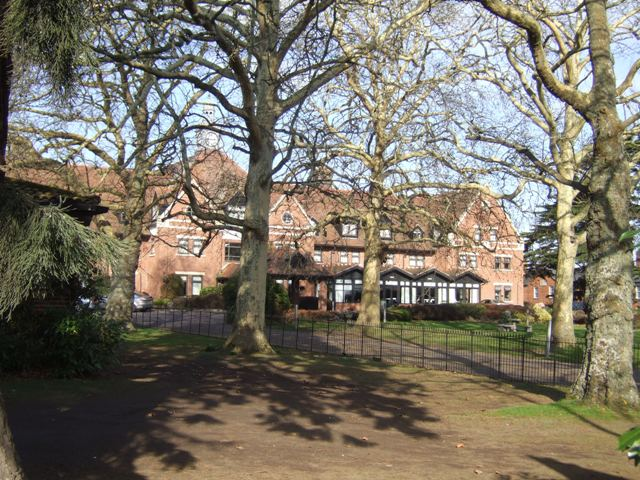
The DoubleTree by Hilton Stratford-upon-Avon which retains the original clock tower and much of the exterior features of the old Victorian hospital

The facility has its origins in the Stratford-upon-Avon Dispensary established in Chapel Street in 1823. It moved to expanded facilities in Chapel Lane as the Stratford-upon-Avon Infirmary in 1838.

A new facility built in the Victorian style opened in Alcester Road as the Stratford-upon-Avon Hospital in 1884. The hospital expanded in the first half of the 20th century taking over many of the old workhouse buildings on Arden Street to the immediate north of the old Victorian hospital. The facility joined the National Health Service in 1948 and, after new buildings had been built on the old workhouse site, the old Victorian hospital was sold and rebuilt, albeit retaining the original clock tower and much of the exterior features, as a hotel (now known as the DoubleTree by Hilton Stratford-upon-Avon) in 1996.

A new building, which was built by Speller Metcalfe on the Arden Street site at a cost of £22 million, was completed in July 2017.
