= Royal Pump Rooms =

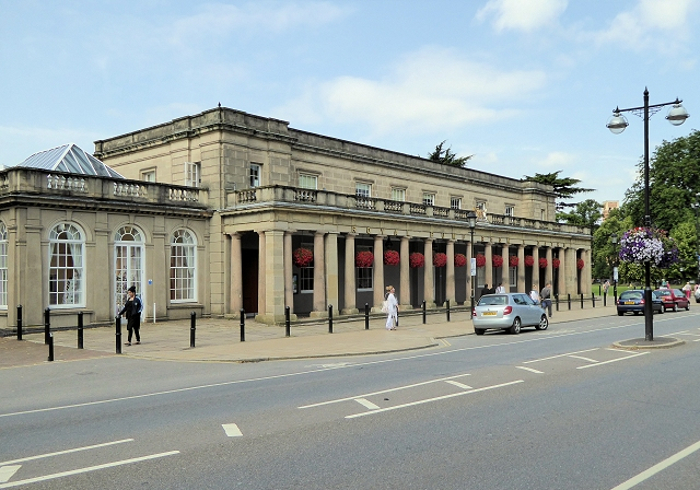
- Royal Pump Rooms

- Shown in Warwickshire
- 52.2869°N 1.5344°W
- Location: The Parade, Leamington Spa

History
- Built: 1814

Site notes
- Architect: Charles S. Smith
- Architectural style: Classical style

Listed Building – Grade II
- Designated: 1 March 1949
- Reference no.: 1381439

The Royal Pump Rooms is a cultural centre on the Parade in Leamington Spa, Warwickshire, England. It was the most famous of several spa baths opened in Leamington between the late-18th and mid-19th centuries. People would travel from throughout the country, and indeed Europe, to benefit from treatments using the town's healing waters. When 'taking the waters' became less fashionable after the mid-19th century the Pump Rooms became Leamington's only surviving spa facility, later also being extended to include the town's public swimming pool. After a major redevelopment in 1997-99 the building now houses Leamington Spa Art Gallery & Museum, a public library, a Tourist Information Centre, cafe and assembly rooms. It is a Grade II listed building.

== History ==
=== Background and beginnings ===
By the time that a spring had been found at the site of the rooms in 1811, Leamington already had a reputation as an up-and-coming spa resort. Six wells had been discovered south of the River Leam in and around the village. The influx of tourists wishing to bathe in these springs and 'take the waters' had led to speculators developing land to the north of the river. They decided that they needed to find a spring on their side of the river so that they could erect a suitably grand building fit for the town they aimed to develop. Another spring was found in 1811 on the land of Mr Bertie Greatheed and the building's design in the Classical style was undertaken by local architect Charles S. Smith (who also designed the town's Upper Assembly Rooms and The Regent Hotel). The building, named The New Pump Rooms and Baths, was opened three years later in July 1814.

Within months of opening the baths proved so popular that the building needed to be extended. It was finally completed two years later in 1816. Including the wings at the north and south end, the building was 166 feet long with 17 hot baths and 3 cold baths. The total development cost was a fraction under £18,000. Among the most interesting, though not at the time most famous or notable, parts of the development were the pumps which were manufactured by the engineering giants Boulton and Watt of Smethwick, Birmingham. It also included the world's first gravity fed piped hot water system in modern times, which was designed and installed in 1815 by the engineer William Murdoch.

=== Hard times ===
From the 1840s onwards the British spa town tourist industry began to wane thanks to the growing popularity of spas in continental Europe, notably Belgium and France. Faced with the decline in demand for spa health treatments the decision was made in 1860 to close the Pump Rooms with a view to demolishing them and selling the land. However a group of local investors clubbed together and bought the building in October 1861. After spending £17,000 on refurbishment, including the addition of Victorian Turkish baths and a swimming pool, the Pump Rooms re-opened in 1863.

However, it proved impossible to operate them at a profit and they were sold to the local board of health in 1868. They remain in local authority ownership. In 1875 the Royal Pump Room Gardens next to the building, which until then were only accessible to patrons of the Pump Rooms, were opened to the public. Also in 1875, George Elson and his wife were appointed to manage the Turkish baths, staying there just under fourteen years and considerably increasing the number of bathers patronising them. In 1889 a further large public swimming pool was opened. An annexe was added to the south of the main assembly room in 1910 and another to the north some years later. Around 1950 the tower added in the 1860s was demolished. In 1989 the swimming pool was closed and relocated to a new leisure centre building in Newbold Comyn.

=== Redevelopment ===
After a number of different schemes to redevelop the Royal Pump Rooms had been considered, in 1997 work began on a major project to reuse it as a cultural complex. This opened after two years of redevelopment led by Warwick District Council in partnership with Warwickshire County Council, South Warwickshire Tourism Ltd and a catering company. The Leamington public library and public art gallery were relocated here from their former "Old Library" and annexe site on Avenue Road. The main swimming hall was used to house the library, and the smaller swimming hall and Turkish Baths converted to house Leamington Spa Art Gallery & Museum where visitors can see refurbished areas of the original Turkish baths.

== Chemical analysis ==
A chemical analysis of the Pump Room water in 1914 drew attention to the highly saline constituency of the water. The salts were primarily sodium chloride, but with notable quantities of calcium sulphate, magnesium sulphate, calcium chloride and magnesium chloride. Overall the salinity totalled over 1.7%, around half the average salinity of seawater. This has been ascribed to the district being at the bottom of a large inland sea in prehistoric times.

== Popular culture ==
During the dormant 1990s period the video for the Mick Jagger song "Sweet Thing" was filmed in the baths.

== See also ==
- Jephson Gardens
