= John Bridgeman (sculptor) =

English sculptor (1916–2004)

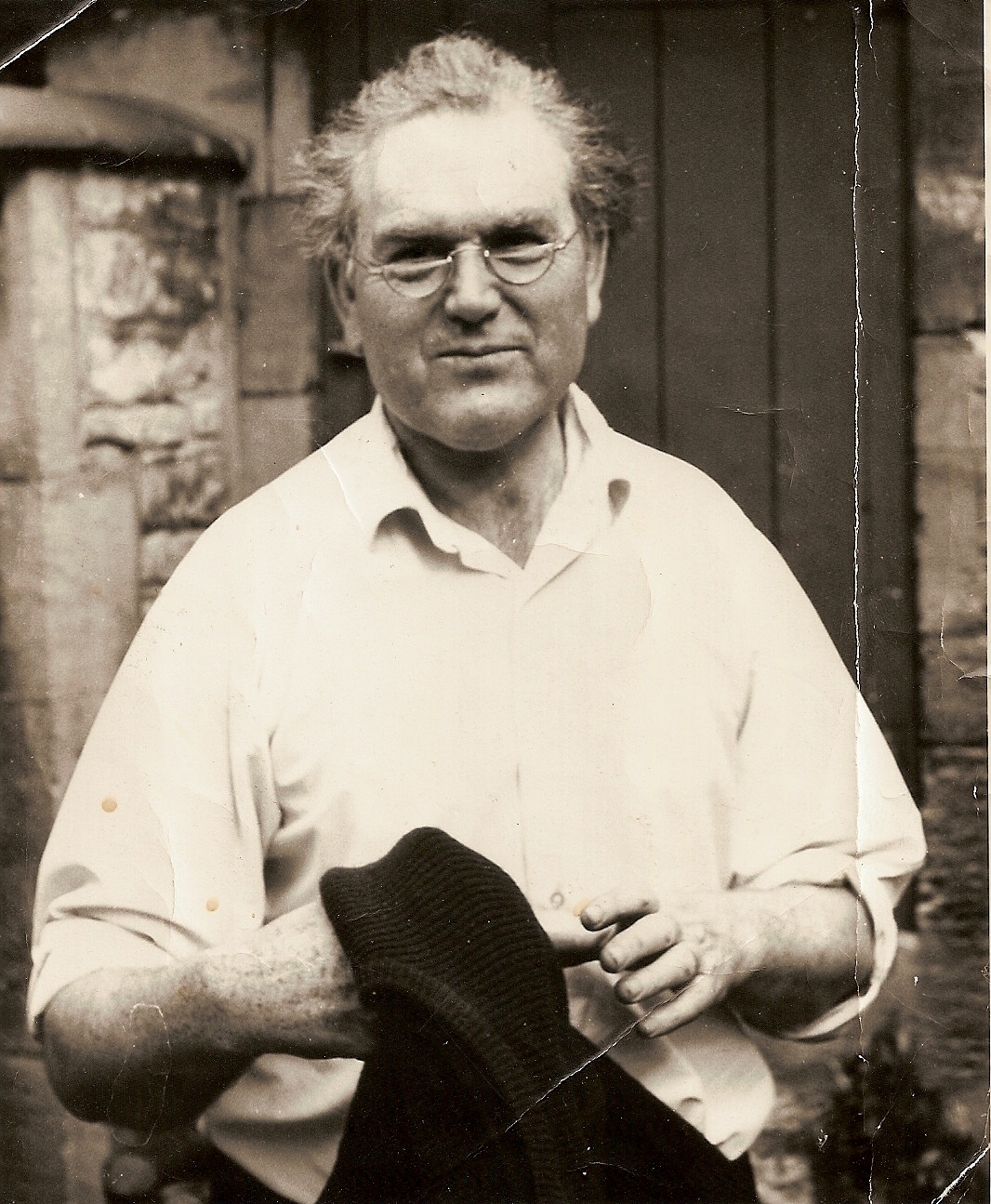
- John Bridgeman outside his studio
- Born: 2 February 1916; Felixstowe, England
- Died: 29 December 2004 (aged 88)
- Notable work: Mater Dolorosa, Coventry Cathedral; Compassion for Dudley Road Hospital, Birmingham

Arthur John Bridgeman ARCA, FRBS, FRBSA (2 February 1916 – 29 December 2004) was an English sculptor.

== Life ==
Born in Felixstowe, Suffolk and named Arthur John, he was usually called 'Bridge' by his friends and signed himself John Bridgeman. He entered Colchester School of Art at the age of 14, and went on from there to the Royal College of Art, where he studied with Frank Dobson. His first love was painting, and it was during this period that he produced many gouache paintings and pastels in a Romantic style celebrating the English countryside.

His RCA studies were interrupted by the Second World War, during which he registered as a conscientious objector, and worked on rescuing people in Fulham bombed during The Blitz; this had a profound effect on him, influencing his art throughout the rest of his life. After the war he was awarded the British Prix de Rome, but did not take up the scholarship, instead going on to work with Misha Black and then on the Dome of Discovery for the Festival of Britain. After a spell as head of sculpture at Carlisle School of Art, 1951–56, he succeeded William Bloye as head of Sculpture at Birmingham School of Art where he worked until retirement in 1981.

== Sculpture ==
His work was popular with both private and municipal patrons and he contributed particularly to the regeneration of Birmingham after the war through the creation of a number of iconic pieces of public art. He also created play sculptures for children in the new council estates which were being built – an innovative idea that was ahead of its time in the 1950s. The last known surviving example was grade II listed in 2015. Always experimenting with new materials, his cement fondue Mother and Baby for Birmingham Maternity Hospital (now Birmingham Hospital for Women) and the over-life-size bronze group Compassion for Dudley Road Hospital (now City Hospital) re-sited on an internal wall in 2004 after having originally been placed on the outside of the building. are typical of his large scale commissions. The Mater Dolorosa in the Lady chapel of the then recently rebuilt Coventry Cathedral is perhaps the most powerful of his religious works, which he created throughout his life. His life-size bronze statue now dedicated to the Unknown Refugee, originally commissioned in the 1980s only found a home after his death in 2004 and was installed in Jephson Gardens, Royal Leamington Spa on 11th March 2025. The plaster for this sculpture was kept at the studio he shared with Nick Jones in St Leonard's Church, Spernall, Warwickshire and was later transferred to Pangolin Foundry where it awaited casting for many years before it was put into bronze in 2024.

Towards the end of his life he concentrated on smaller female figures proving himself to be one of the last great practitioners of the art of lost-wax modelling. His philosophy of art and his interest in methods and materials are embodied in the book he co-wrote with his wife, the author and journalist Irene Dancyger, Clay Models and Stone Carving, 1974. His son Paul Bridgeman who died in 2007 was a water colour painter and ceramicist.

== Gallery ==
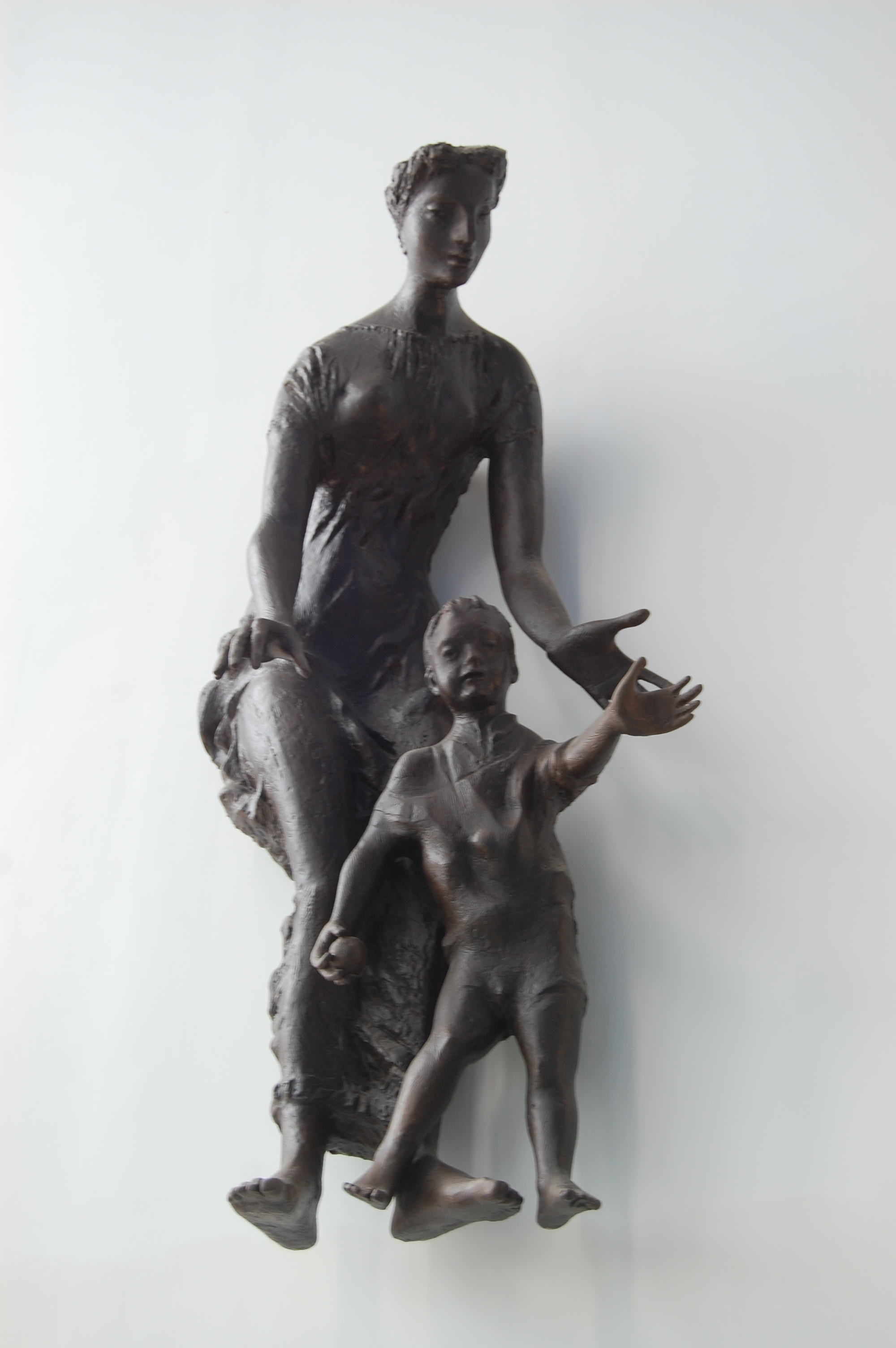
John Bridgeman Mother and Child City Hospital, Birmingham

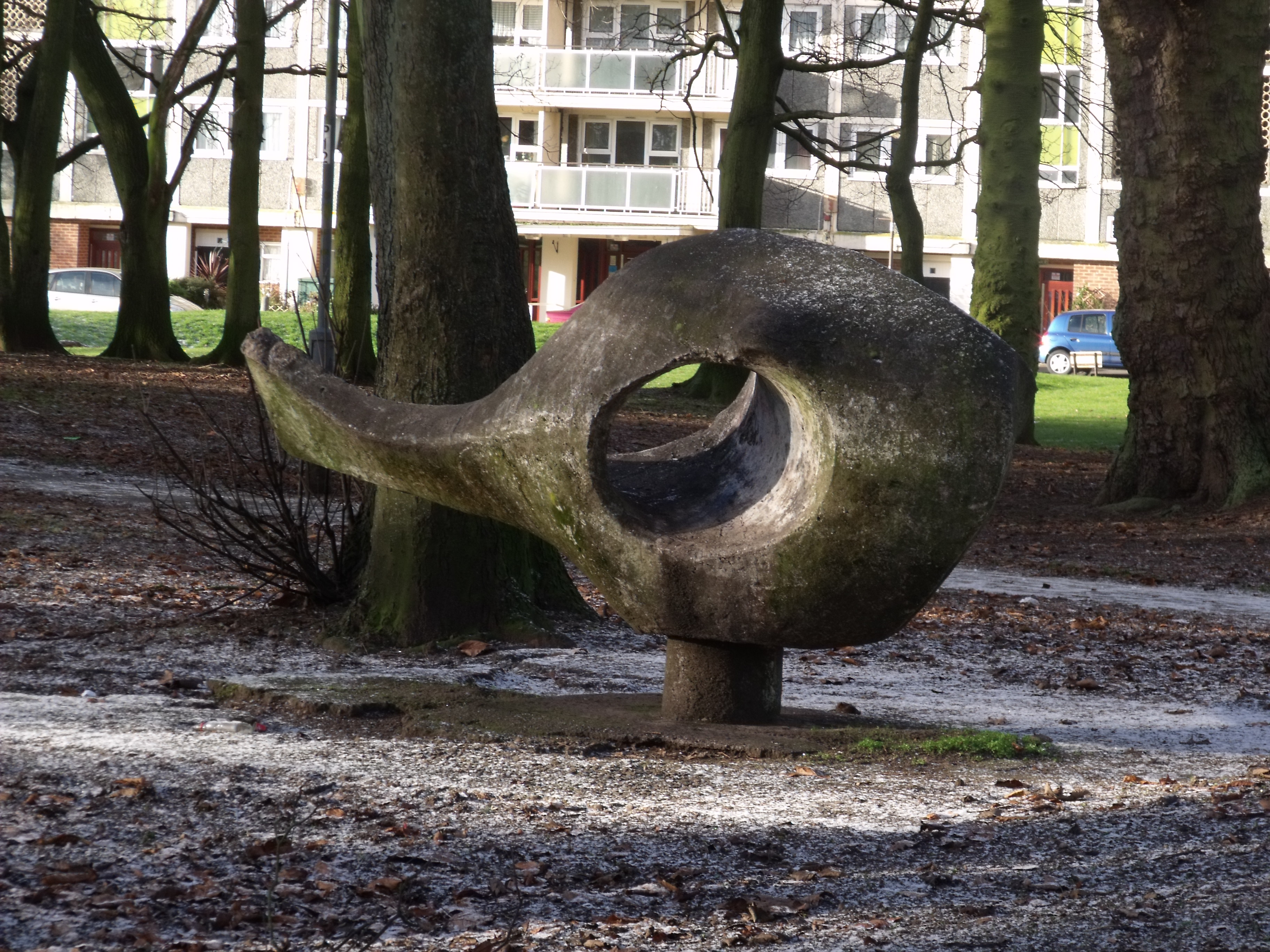
One of Bridgeman's play sculptures, in Acocks Green, Birmingham. It is Grade II listed.

John Bridgeman Unknown Refugee, a mother carrying her child

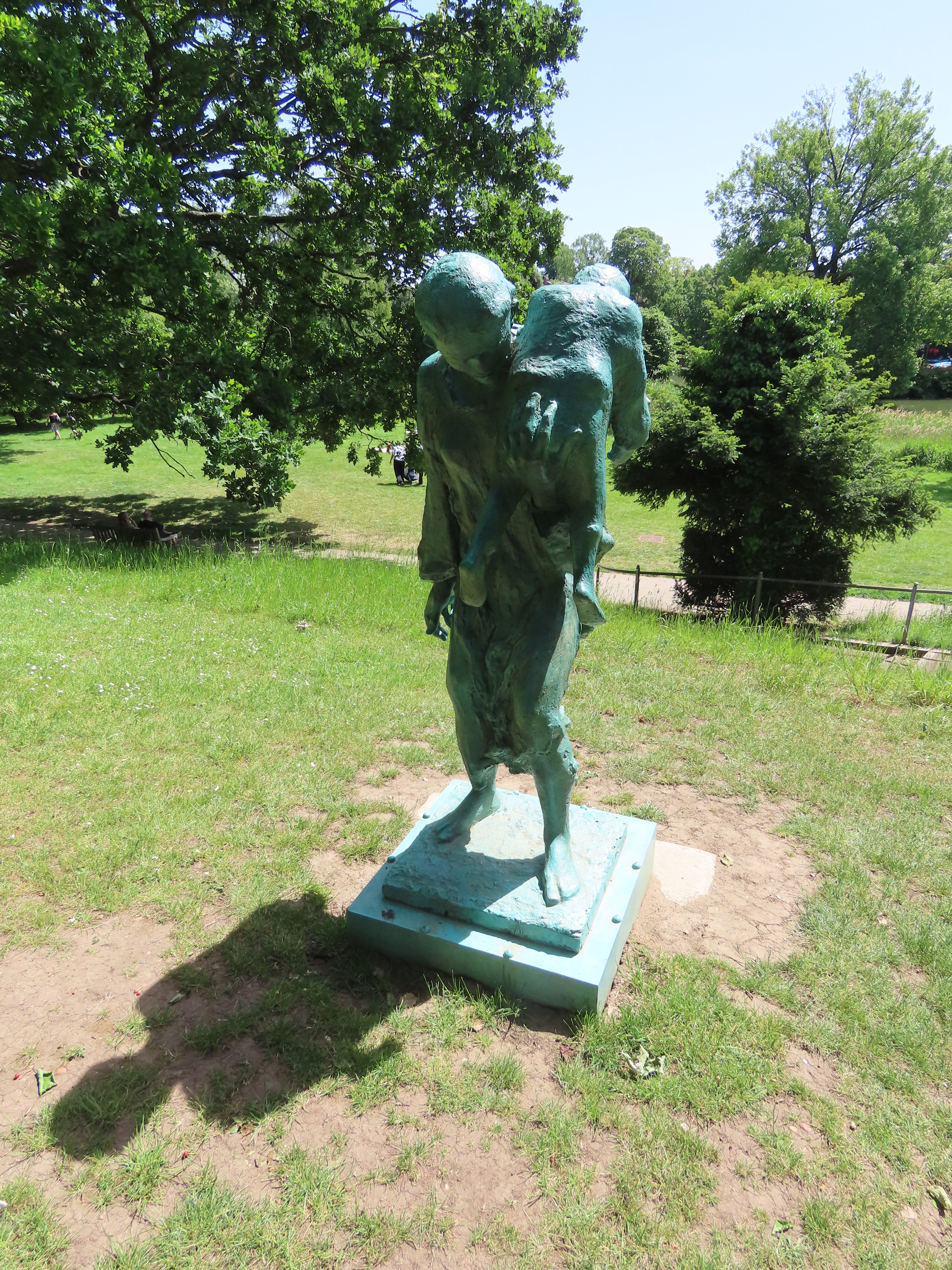
The Unknown Refugee in Jephson Gardens, Royal Leamington Spa.

== Bibliography ==
- Dancyger, Irene, Clay Models and Stone Carving, London, 1974 ISBN 0-87749-564-5
- Noszlopy, George and Beach, Jeremy, Public Sculpture of Birmingham, Liverpool, 1998, p. 56 ISBN 0-85323-692-5
- Fieldhouse, Ken and Woudstra, Jan, The Regeneration of Public Parks, London, 2000, p. 162 ISBN 0-419-25900-7
- Noszlopy, George, Public Sculpture of Warwickshire, Coventry and Solihull, Liverpool, 2003, p. 171 ISBN 0-85323-837-5
- Noszlopy, George and Waterhouse, Fiona, Public Sculpture of Staffordshire and the Black Country, Liverpool, 2005, p. 170, ISBN 0-85323-989-4
- Michael, M.A., On John Bridgeman's Sculpture , in John Bridgeman: Landscape to Sculpture, Exhibition held at the Leamington Spa Museum and Art Gallery, 25 January – 21 April 2013, ISBN 978-1872940007
