= Victoria Eye Hospital =

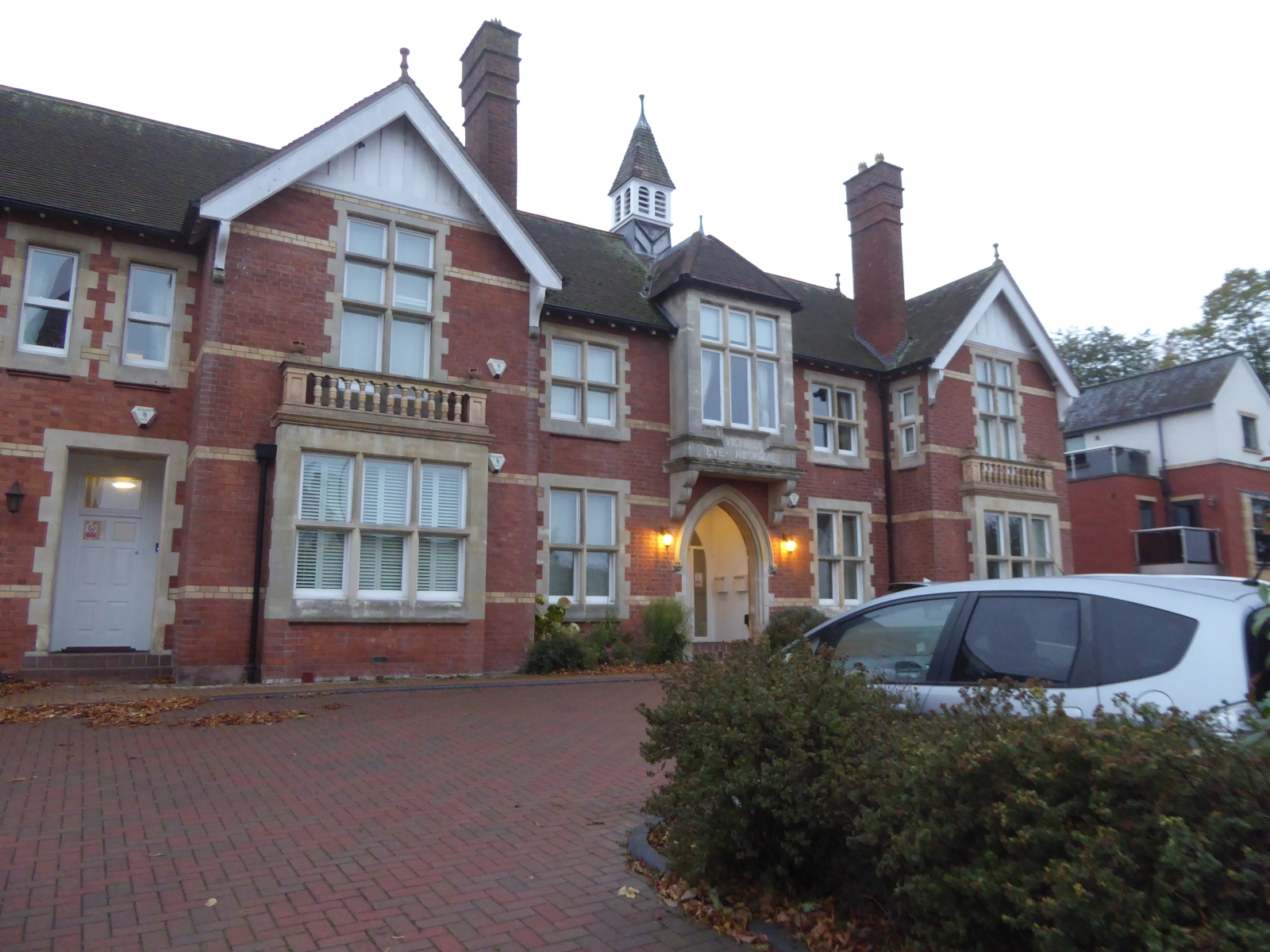
- Victoria Eye Hospital

- Shown in Herefordshire

Geography
- Location: Eign Street, Hereford, England, United Kingdom
- Coordinates: 52.0566°N 2.7223°W

Organisation
- Care system: NHS
- Type: Eye hospital

History
- Founded: 1882
- Closed: 2002

Links
- Lists: Hospitals in England

The Victoria Eye Hospital was a health facility located on Eign Street in Hereford, England. The main building has since been converted into apartments.

== History ==
The facility was established by Francis Woodley Lindsay, a surgeon, in rented premises in Commercial Road as the Herefordshire and South Wales Eye and Ear Institution in 1882. It moved to permanent premises in Eign Street as the Victoria Eye and Ear Hospital in 1888 and, after being renamed the Victoria Eye Hospital in 1923, joined the National Health Service in 1948. After services transferred to the new Hereford County Hospital in 2002, the Victoria Eye Hospital closed and has since been converted into apartments.
