= Hull Royal Infirmary =

Hospital in Kingston upon Hull, East Riding of Yorkshire, England

- Hull University Teaching Hospitals NHS Trust
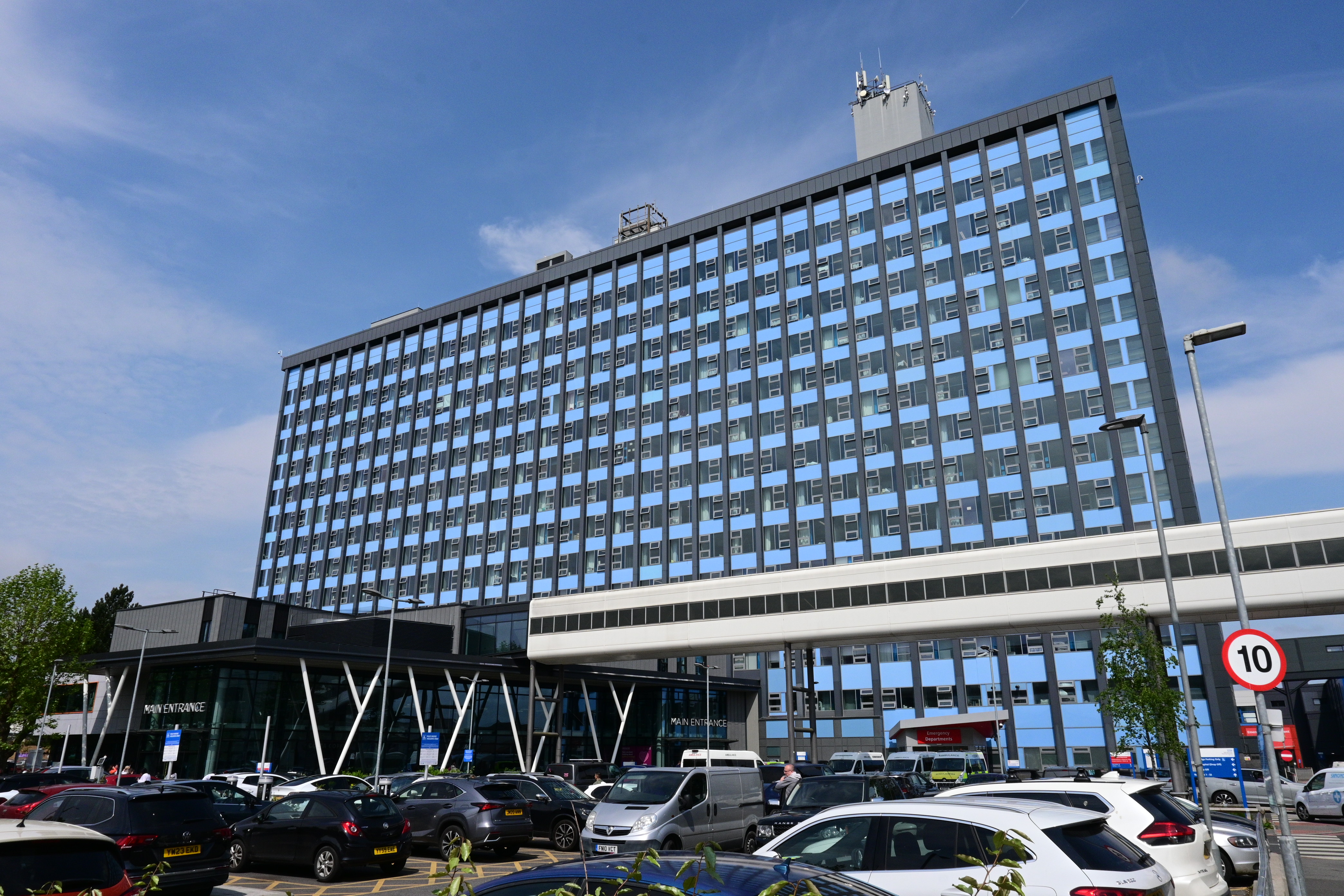
- Hull Royal Infirmary, Anlaby Road

- Shown in the East Riding of Yorkshire

Geography
- Location: Kingston upon Hull, East Riding of Yorkshire, England
- Coordinates: 53.744500°N 0.356500°W

Organisation
- Care system: NHS England
- Type: Teaching
- Affiliated university: Hull York Medical School University of Hull

Services
- Emergency department: Major Trauma Centre
- Beds: 700

Helipads
- Helipad: Yes

History
- Founded: 1782

Links
- Website: https://www.hey.nhs.uk
- Lists: Hospitals in England

Hull Royal Infirmary is a tertiary teaching hospital and is one of the two main hospitals for Kingston upon Hull (the other being Castle Hill Hospital in nearby Cottingham). It is situated on Anlaby Road, just outside the city centre, and is run by Hull University Teaching Hospitals NHS Trust.

== History ==
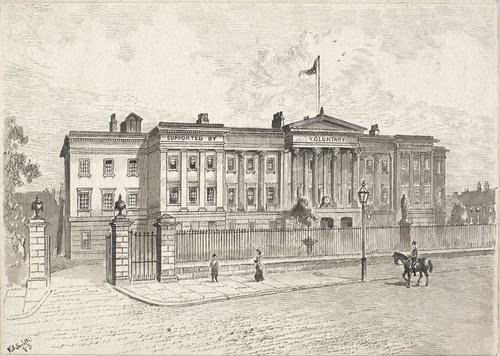
The old infirmary in Prospect Street completed in 1884

The infirmary was first established in temporary premises in George Street in 1782 before permanent premises could be completed and opened in Prospect Street in 1784. John Alderson, a physician at the infirmary, founded the "Sculcoates Refuge for the Insane" in 1814. After the Duke and Duchess of Edinburgh laid the foundation stone for a new building in 1884, it was renamed Hull Royal Infirmary.

After the old buildings in Prospect Street became dilapidated in the 1950s, the infirmary moved to new premises in Anlaby Road, which were designed by architects Yorke Rosenberg Mardall and for which the foundation stone was laid by Enoch Powell on 25 September 1963. The construction was undertaken by Trollope & Colls and the new facilities were opened by Queen Elizabeth II in June 1967. The new hospital incorporated a distinctive 13-storey tower designed to accommodate the majority of the medical facilities.

The hospital's Accident and Emergency Department (A&E) had a £7 million refurbishment, intended to improve the range the services being offered, in October 2011. Work began to install a new 24-bed prefabricated ward on top of a 4-storey building to the rear of the main tower block in November 2014.

In 2021, the trust announced further expansion plans including the construction of a new three-storey front entrance at the main hospital tower block, a new £6 million Allam Diabetes Centre on Anlaby Road, and a new £8 million intensive care unit.

In 2023, a Care Quality Commission report of the hospital's performance found it "required improvement" and rated its A&E department "inadequate". Anonymous whistle-blowers have labelled the A&E department a "death trap".

== Facilities ==
The hospital has a dedicated Centre for Magnetic Resonance Investigations on site which houses two MRI scanners. It also houses the dedicated Hull Royal Eye Hospital which provides tertiary level sub-speciality ophthalmic care.

In March 2023, a £3.8 million 60-bed prefabricated unit was being built to enable patients who no longer needed medical treatment, but had no suitable care plan to allow them to be discharged, to be housed.

== See also ==
- List of hospitals in England
