= John Bridgeman play sculpture, Birmingham =

Sculpture in Birmingham, England

Play sculpture
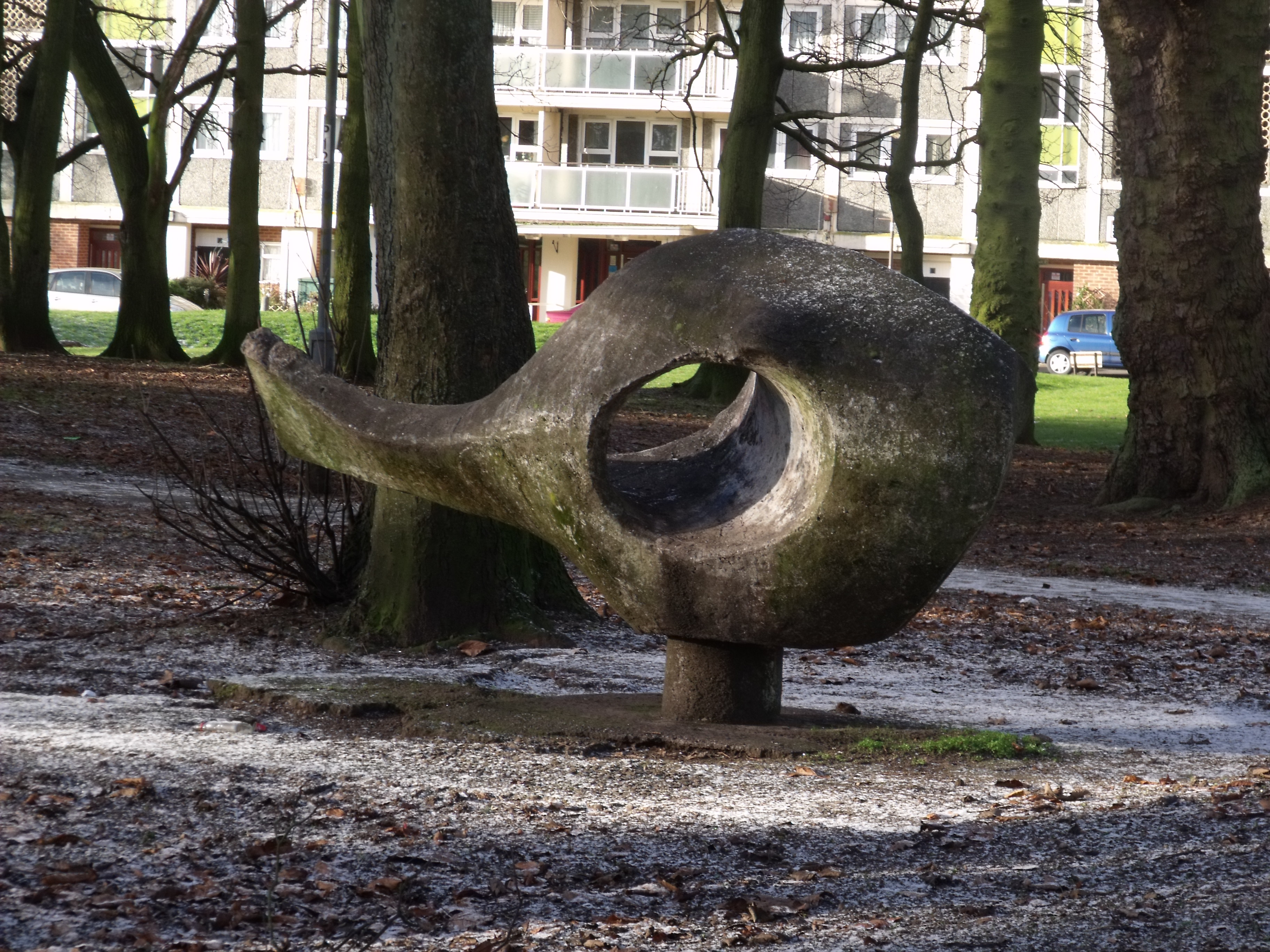
- Artist: John Bridgeman
- Year: 1960s
- Type: Abstract sculpture
- Medium: Concrete
- Location: Curtis Gardens, Fox Hollies Road, Acocks Green, Birmingham, England; 52.440554°N 1.835103°W
- Owner: Birmingham City Council

The sculptor John Bridgeman was commissioned in the early 1960s by playground designer Mary Frances Mitchell, to create an abstract sculpture in concrete, for a Birmingham City Council playground, on Curtis Gardens, on a housing estate on Fox Hollies Road in the Acocks Green district of Birmingham, England. It has been described as "fish like".

It is the only one of a series of playground sculptures by Bridgeman, who was head of sculpture at Birmingham College of Arts and Crafts until 1981, to survive. It was originally painted in a metallic sheen, but this is now mostly worn off.

In February 2015, the untitled piece was grade II listed by the Department for Culture, Media and Sport, on the advice of Historic England, giving it legal protection from removal or alteration.
