= John Hitchman =

British medical doctor (1805–1867)

John Hitchman MRCS (1805 – 3 March 1867) was a British medical doctor and philanthropist associated with the town of Royal Leamington Spa. Born in Chipping Norton, Oxfordshire, Hitchman moved to Royal Leamington Spa by 1828 to work as a surgeon. From 1832 he was on the staff of the Warwickshire County Hospital, later renamed the Warneford Hospital and Bathing Institution. Hitchman donated funds to many charitable funds for the poor. In 1851 he purchased land to establish The Arboretum, a planted space for the free use of the public. This grew into a 40 acres (16 ha) site containing 500,000 shrubs and trees.

In 1862 Hitchman established his own hospital in The Arboretum, focussed on hydropathy. He adopted homeopathy in 1865 and, though the board disapproved of this as "quackery" he was permitted to remain on the staff of the Warneford Hospital. Hitchman's death was attributed to overwork on his medical practice and charitable causes. Townsfolk contributed for the construction of a memorial fountain, erected in 1869.

== Medical career and local government ==
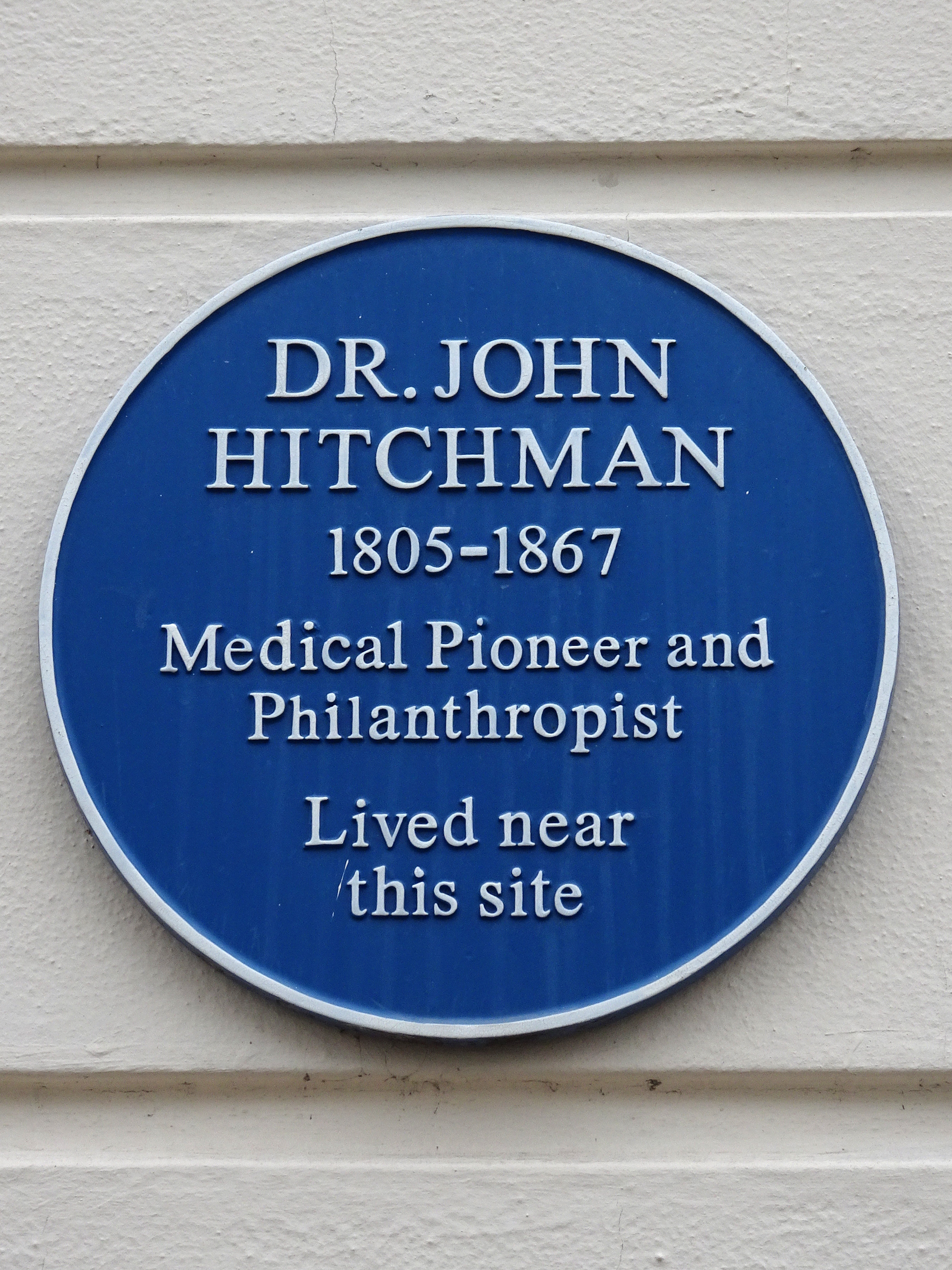
Blue plaque in Lansdowne Place

Hitchman was born in Chipping Norton, Oxfordshire, in 1805. He trained as a surgeon's assistant in Banbury before moving to Leamington Priors (renamed Royal Leamington Spa in 1838) in 1827/28. He established a surgeon's practice in Clemens Street and later moved to High Street and then The Parade. For at least 20 years he lived in a house on Lansdowne Place. Hitchman married Sarah Baker of Fenton, Staffordshire, at Stoke on Trent on 26 April 1832. In his surgery Hitchman often prescribed meat from the butcher and remitted his fees for poor patients. From 1832 Hitchman was a surgeon at the town's Warwickshire County Hospital, later renamed the Warneford Hospital and Bathing Institution, and was appointed to its board.

Hitchman took a keen interest in his new town and became one of its improvement commissioners. He was the oldest sitting commissioner when that body was abolished and replaced by a local board of health in 1853, he remained on the board until his death. A campaign by Hitchman saved the footpath to Guy's Cliffe from being severed by construction of the Coventry–Leamington line (opened 1844), the London and Birmingham Railway being persuaded to construct a subway beneath the line.

== Philanthropy ==
By 1840 Hitchman was contributing to a fund for the assistance of the poor in Leamington. In 1843, amidst concerns over the impacts of proposed changes to the Corn Laws, he organised the Labourer's Relief Fund to provide employment to working-class men in Leamington. The fund carried out significant works in public gardens adjacent to the River Leam installing paths, raising the river's banks and creating the park's lake. The park was formalised in 1846 as Jephson Gardens, named after Henry Jephson, another local doctor and philanthropist. Hitchman was one of the park's original 44 trustees.

Hitchman also contributed to soup funds and was an advocate for the Leamington College for Boys. In the 1860s he was responsible for the planting of Binswood Avenue and Beauchamp Avenue with lime trees.

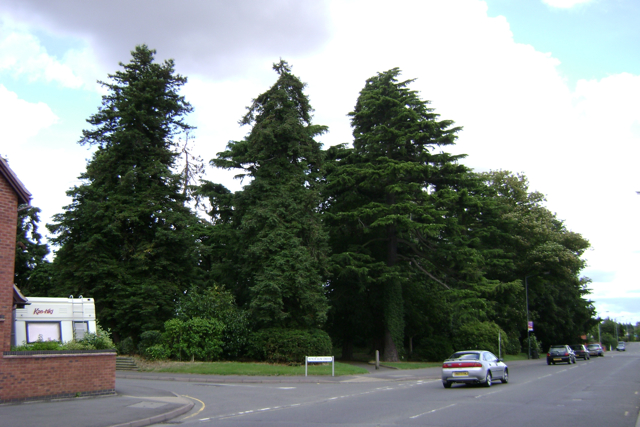
Remaining trees of the Arboretum

In 1851 Hitchman bought 11 acres (4.5 ha) of land at the edge of Leamington and planted thousands of flowers, shrubs and trees, many of exotic species. The site was opened to free public access as the Arboretum. It eventually expanded to more than 40 acres (16 ha) between Tachbrook Road and Saint Helen's Road and included 500,000 shrubs and trees. Hitchman held a festival on the site to commemorate the end of the Crimean War (1853-1856) and erected a mission facing Tachbrook Street for the holding of prayer services, often preaching there on Sunday afternoons.

== Alternative medicine ==
Hitchman was a proponent of hydropathy, particularly with salt water. In 1862 he established the Arboretum Hydropathic Hospital on a portion of the Arboretum, part-funded by an auction of more than 300,000 rare plants and trees. The Hospital became Hitchman's main residence.

Hitchman announced his adoption of homeopathy at a meeting of the Midland Homeopathic Medical Society in Birmingham in June 1865. The practice was rejected by mainstream medicine. Although he was permitted to remain on the staff of the Warneford Hospital, the institution's board passed a byelaw preventing the future appointment of any medical officer that practised "hydropathy, homeopathy, mesmerism or any other form of quackery". Hitchman remained on the staff until his death, after which the board dropped the use of "Bathing Institution" in the hospital's title.

== Death and legacy ==
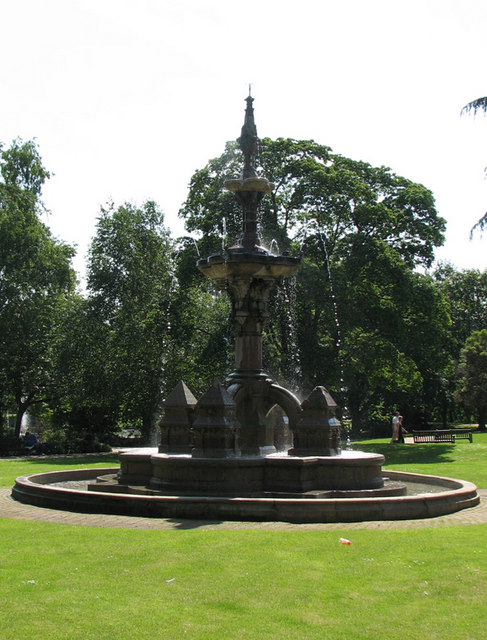
Hitchman fountain, Leamington

In his later years Hitchman advocated for the better treatment of sewage in Leamington. His activism led to the establishment, in the summer of 1866, of a committee of engineers to resolve the matter. Hitchman died at the Arboretum Hospital on the morning of 3 March 1867. The Homeopathic Medical Directory attributed his death to an illness arising from his hard work and charitable interests.

Hitchman was buried at Whitnash Road cemetery on 8 March. His funeral procession from The Arboretum was attended by many of the townspeople, resulting in one of the largest crowds seen in the town to that date. Many of the shops closed for the day and blinds across the town were closed as a mark of respect.

A committee under Dr Jephson of the Warneford Hospital met soon after Hitchman's death to plan a memorial to him. Townspeople subscribed more than £300 (equivalent to £35,000 in 2023) for construction of a memorial fountain which was erected in the north-west corner of Jephson Gardens in 1869. After his death Hitchman's wife returned to her family in Staffordshire where she died in 1890. She provided land for St John the Baptist's Church and part-funded its construction, which was completed in February 1878 as a replacement for the Tachbrook Street mission.

The Arboretum Hospital survived until 1883 when homeopathy went out of fashion, and it was purchased by the Midland Counties Home for Incurables for use as a hospice. It was taken over by the National Health Service in 1948 and closed in 1995 with most of the land sold for housing. Around an acre of the Arboretum woodland, which became known as Hitchman's Wood by the late 20th century, survives on Saint Helens Road.
