= George Eliot Hospital =

- George Eliot Hospital NHS Trust
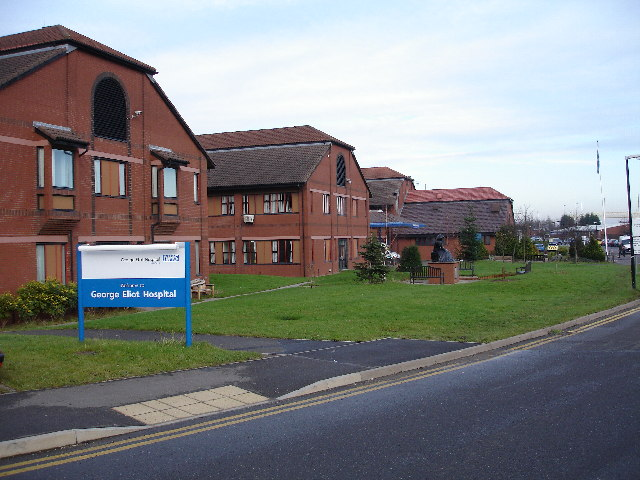
- George Eliot Hospital

- Location in Warwickshire

Geography
- Location: College Street, Nuneaton, Warwickshire, England, United Kingdom
- Coordinates: 52.5108°N 1.4757°W

Organisation
- Care system: Public NHS
- Type: General
- Affiliated university: Warwick Medical School

Services
- Emergency department: Yes Accident & Emergency
- Beds: 352

History
- Founded: 1948

Links
- Website: www.geh.nhs.uk
- Lists: Hospitals in England

George Eliot Hospital is a single site hospital located in Nuneaton, Warwickshire, it is managed by the George Eliot Hospital NHS Trust. It provides a full range of emergency and elective medical services, including maternity services, to the local area.

The Hospital is one of many local buildings named after Nuneaton-born author George Eliot. Additionally, many of the hospital's surgical and medical wards are named after characters within George Eliot novels (e.g. Felix Holt, Arbury lodge, Caterina, Adam Bede, Dolly Winthrop). The hospital also has a set of operating theatres on the first floor.

== History ==
The George Eliot Hospital opened in 1948. The hospital established its own museum in 1982: originally intended as a teaching aid, the museum evolved into one of the few NHS-owned museums in the country until cost-cutting measures forced it to close.

The hospital expanded in July 1993, when the Manor Hospital, which had provided the Nuneaton's accident and emergency services, operating theatres and orthopedic wards closed; the Manor Hospital has since turned into a doctor's surgery. The Queen visited the George Eliot Hospital in December 1994 as part of her first visit to Nuneaton and unveiled a bust of herself which can be seen in the main entrance.

The George Eliot Hospital Training and Education Centre ('GETEC') opened in July 2005.

An Acute health trust report released in 2006 suggested that George Eliot Hospital should be downgraded and some of its services moved to the new University Hospital Coventry in the Walsgrave area of Coventry which is nearby. The report generated local opposition and led to the formation of a local protest group 'Nuneaton People's Protest Group', which was successful in fighting off the ward closures. In May 2010, the Hospital announced that it was closing two wards, Lydgate and Romola, part of a new series of cost-cutting measures.

The Trust is one of a small number implementing the Lorenzo patient record systems, having accepted a controversial financial support package in 2013.

== Services ==
Nuneaton Area Hospital Broadcasting Service broadcasts from the hospital.

== See also ==
- List of hospitals in England
