= Graeme Mitcheson =

British sculptor

- Born: 16 April 1973 (age 53); Ashington, Northumberland, England
- Education: Loughborough University
- Known for: Sculpture
- Website: www.chisel-it.co.uk

Graeme Mitcheson (b. 16 April 1973) is a British sculptor working mainly on large-scale public artworks. Several of his pieces are at the National Memorial Arboretum in Staffordshire.

== Work ==
After graduating in 1995 with a degree in fine arts from Loughborough College of Art, Mitcheson moved to Oakthorpe in Leicestershire where he established a studio. His inspirations include Henri Rousseau, Eric Gill and Henry Moore. His preferred medium is limestone, but he has expanded to work in other mediums. He was elected an associate member of the Royal Society of Sculptors (MRSS) in 2008.

A selection of works by Graeme Mitcheson
Year	Work	Location	Material	Image
1996	Vista the ninth of ten River Eden benchmarks	Cumbria	St. Bees sandstone	
2004	Celebrating Bedworth’s Heritage	Rye Piece Ringway, Bedworth	Mixed sandstones	
2005	Sundial	Hafod Bing, Rhosllannerchrugog	Sandstone	
2007	Mytilus Edilus	Conwy, North Wales	Kilkenny limestone	
2009	Tranquillity Seats	De Montfort Square, Leicester	Cornish granite	
2009	The Family	Fillongley, Warwickshire	Sandstone	
2009	Tom	Ansley village green, Warwickshire	Sandstone	
2009	Sculptural mooring posts	Loughborough Canal Basin	Corncockle sandstone	
2011	Sir Bobby Robson Memorial	Newscastle-Upon-Tyne	Portland limestone	
2013	Bevin Boys memorial	National Memorial Arboretum, Staffordshire	Kilkenny quarry stones	
2014	Naval Service memorial	National Memorial Arboretum, Staffordshire	Coloured glass, granite, Kilkenny limestone	
2015	Muntjac Deer	Quorn, Leicestershire	Mountsorrel granite	
2018	Milk Churn Man	Nestlé Factory, Hatton, Derby	Sandstone	
2019	The Best of Times During the Worst of Times 10th Battalion Memorial	Burrough on the Hill, Leicestershire	Woodwork sandstone	
2019	Heathlands Sculpture Trail	Pulborough Brooks RSPB Nature Reserve, West Sussex	Woodkirk sandstone	
2021	Leighton Buzzard Light Railway (LBLR) Memorial	Leighton Buzzard	Sandstone	
2023	Everglow	City Field, Wakefield	Coloured glass and concrete	
2023	Mesothelioma Memorial	National Memorial Arboretum	Clipsham limestone	

=== Collaborations ===
- 1996 - Mitcheson worked with David Haigh on a public sculpture for Batley
- 1997 - Mitcheson assisted Richard Perry on Six Figures at Nottingham Castle Museum and Art Gallery

== Awards and nominations ==
- 2012 - Lord Mayor's Award for Landscape Design for the Sir Bobby Robson Memorial
- 2014 - Honorary member of the Royal Naval Association for work on the memorial
- 2016 - Marsh Award for Excellence in Public Sculpture - shortlisted
- 2018 - Keith Hayman Award for Public Art – shortlisted for The Railwaymen
