= Wye Valley NHS Trust =

Healthcare trust in England

- Type: NHS hospital trust
- Budget: £176 million
- Hospitals: Hereford County Hospital
- Chair: Russell Hardy
- Chief executive: Glen Burley
- Website: www.wyevalley.nhs.uk

Wye Valley NHS Trust was established in 2011 by a merger of Hereford Hospitals NHS Trust with Herefordshire PCT community services and Herefordshire Council’s Adult Social Care services. It runs Hereford County Hospital, Bromyard Community Hospital, Leominster Community Hospital and Ross Community Hospital, in Herefordshire, England.

== Future ==
It has relied on external financial support of about £9 million a year for some years and has accepted that it will not attain NHS Foundation Trust status in its present form. It announced plans to seek either a partnership with an NHS foundation trust, a private-sector franchise or the break-up of its services to a number of providers, but in February 2014 after “an exhaustive examination of the options” to test their financial and clinical viability the Trust Board “found that none of them appeared to meet the stringent criteria required”.

The chairman of the Trust confirmed in March 2014 that he was stepping down. He told the Hereford Times he was leaving after 11 years with the NHS in the county to “pursue business interests.” He was the third high-profile loss to the Trust in 2014 with both chief executive Derek Smith and medical director Dr Peter Wilson confirming that they were leaving in June and May respectively.

Three board members from South Warwickshire NHS Foundation Trust were appointed to run the trust in October 2016 after the Trust's chair, appointed in 2014, Museji Takolia resigned. The chief executive Glen Burley and chair Russell Hardy will be appointed chief executive and chair of Wye Valley on a part-time basis in a move reported as likely to lead to the formation of a hospital chain, a development opposed by local MP Jesse Norman. In July 2017 it agreed to set up a “foundation group” to create twin Accountable care organizations with South Warwickshire, though there does not appear to be any plan to merge the two trusts.

== Performance ==
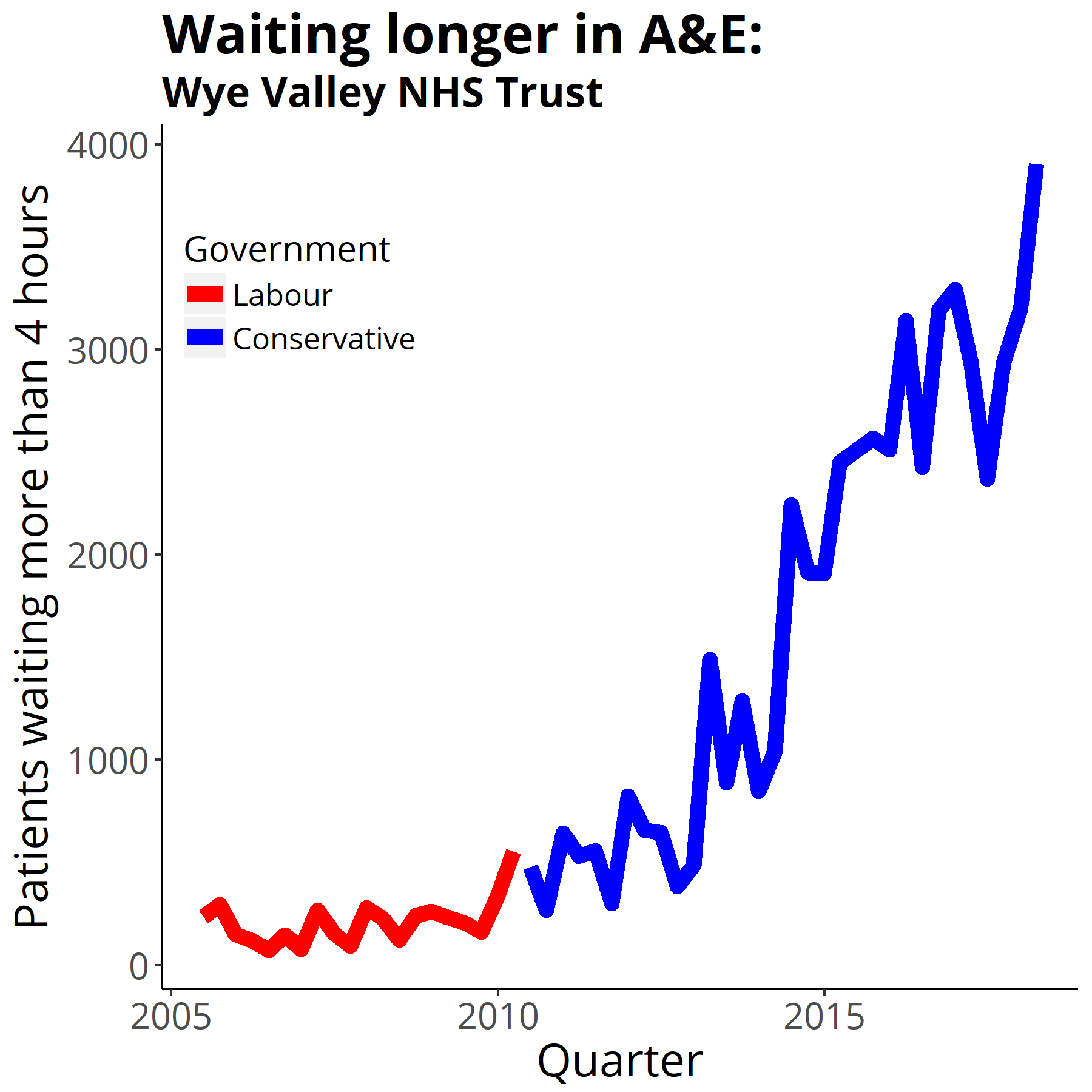
Four-hour target in the emergency department quarterly figures from NHS England Data from https://www.england.nhs.uk/statistics/statistical-work-areas/ae-waiting-times-and-activity/

It was put into special measures by the Care Quality Commission from October 2014 to November 2016.

It was one of the worst-performing trusts in England against NHS targets for both the referral to treatment and accident and emergency with 91 patients who had waited more than 52 weeks for treatment in October 2018, and was in a dispute with the clinical commissioning group over the cost of bringing down the waiting list.

== Capacity ==
Hereford County Hospital has 208 beds. In December 2014 it was taking between 35 and 55 emergency admissions each day, of which about 23% are discharged the same day. It transfers around 50 patients a month to private sector providers because of lack of capacity. Non-elective patients stay an average 6 days and elective patients 2 days. A&E attendances increased by 1,640 (3.6%) from 2012/13 to 2013/14. The majority of the increase since 2012/13 1,368 (83.4%) are people over 65.

In April 2014 it was reported that two minor injury units in Hereford, were closed for a month as staff were moved to Hereford County Hospital's A&E in order "boost the resources at Hereford County Hospital’s accident and emergency department enabling the trust to continue to see and treat patients, and care for the increased number of patients requiring admission to acute hospital".

Kier Group has a contract for a £40m programme of reconfiguration works at Hereford County Hospital.

The trust was one of the beneficiaries of Boris Johnson's announcement of capital funding for the NHS in August 2019, with an allocation of £23.6 million for new hospital wards in Hereford providing 72 beds.

== See also ==
- List of NHS trusts
