= Jephson Gardens =

Formal gardens in Leamington Spa, Warwickshire, England

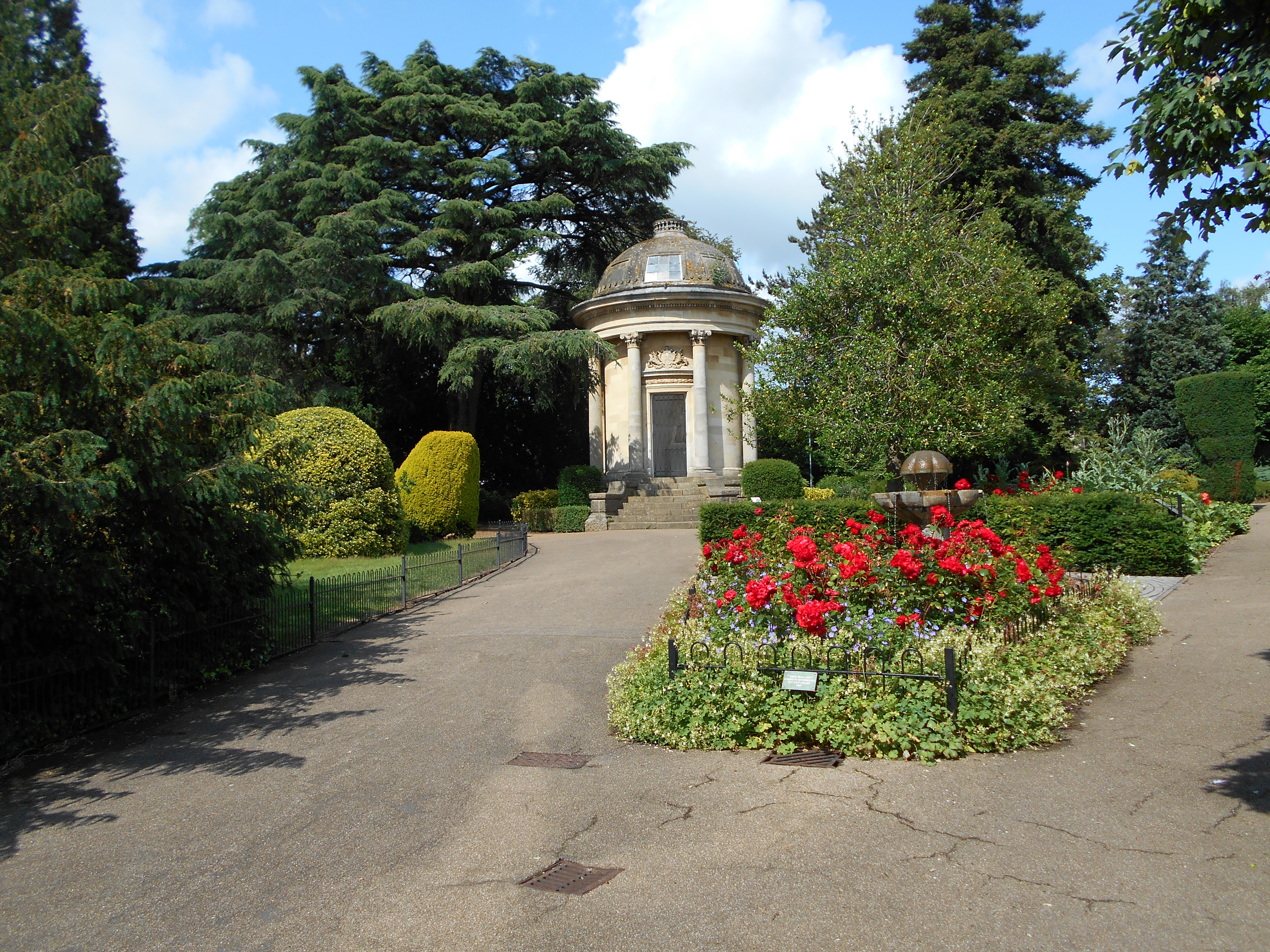
- Looking towards the Jephson Memorial
- Interactive map of Jephson Gardens
- Type: Public park
- Location: Leamington, Warwickshire, England.
- Coordinates: 52.287816°N 1.531953°W
- Area: 14.6 acres (59,000 m^{2})
- Operator: Warwick District Council
- Status: Open all year

The Jephson Gardens are formal gardens, together with a grassed park, in the town of Leamington Spa, Warwickshire. The gardens, once a place for the wealthy to 'take the air' and 'be seen', are found in the centre of the town on the Parade, with the River Leam flowing to the south of them. One of the town's most popular tourist attractions, they have facilities such as cafes and floral displays. The gardens are often marketed in tandem with the nearby all-grassed Mill Gardens on the south side of the river. The gardens have a total area of 14.6 acres (59,000 m^{2}) with Mill Gardens and its boating lake, both on the opposite side of the river, providing an extra 3.9 acres (16,000 m^{2}).

== History ==
The gardens began as farmland which belonged to Edward Willes, a member of the Willes family who played an important part in the shaping of early Leamington. The original gardens, covering just under 10.5 acres (42,000 m^{2}), were laid out in 1834 at the request of the landowner with free entry to anyone between 7 am and 10 am. For the remainder of the day the gardens were open only to paying customers and patrons of a nearby spa bath house. The gardens were soon expanded to their current size and a right of way passing through them was sunk down so it could be used without walking through the gardens. In 1836, two years after starting the project, Willes leased the land to a local consortium for £30 a year.

In 1843, the gardens were improved, the ground being levelled and an ornamental lake being excavated. In 1846 a local committee meeting declared that the gardens be renamed The Jephson Gardens in honour of Dr Henry Jephson who had helped to promote the healing properties of the town's spa waters and built houses for the town's poor residents. A Corinthian-style temple was added to the gardens in 1849 and inside it a large marble statue of the doctor by the Birmingham sculptor Peter Hollins. Most of this early work was undertaken by poor labourers, given employment by another of the town's early philanthropists, Dr John Hitchman. In 1869, Hitchman received recognition of his efforts when a fountain bearing his name was erected in the gardens, near the boundary with the town's main street. This was followed in 1875 by a grey granite obelisk memorial to Edward Willes and in 1925 by a clock tower dedicated to Alderman William Davis, who was mayor of the town three times. All four memorials still stand today.

The twentieth century saw yet more development in the park. Tea rooms were opened in the centre of the gardens in 1899 and were later used as an aviary. From 1901 to 1903, Mill Gardens, Mill Bridge and the boathouse were developed. A 1909 a replacement bandstand was built as the current one was used so often it was a noise nuisance to neighbours. The year 1926 saw two further additions to the gardens. The first was a clock tower in the eastern half of the gardens and the second was a fountain for the lake. A second fountain was added in 1927. The two fountains were based on the fountains at Hampton Court.

In those early years, the attractions of the park were just as strong as today, perhaps more so. There were flower shows which drew entrants from all over England, firework and fairy light displays, balloon ascents and band concerts. Archery and croquet, as well as boating, were two sports allowed in the gardens. There were also tennis courts in the park from 1878 to 1942, when the courts were removed during the Dig for Victory campaign of the Second World War.

From 1951 to 1961 the gardens hosted the Lights of Leamington Festival. It involved lightshows, animated displays, fireworks, illuminated replicas of skylines, and music and dance. Visitors came from the wider Midlands area.

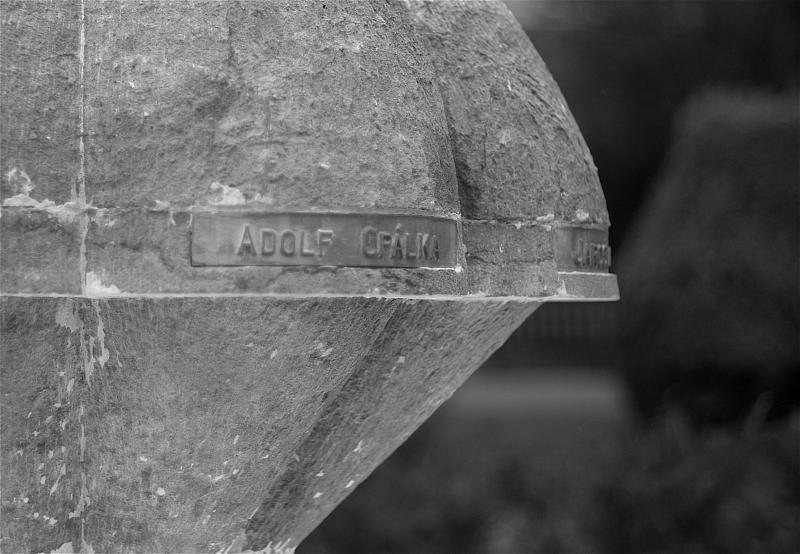
Czech Memorial Fountain

A lasting connection that the gardens have to the war is the Czech Memorial Fountain, unveiled in 1968. Its purpose is to honour those who served in the Czech Free Army, which was based in the town, especially seven men who were parachuted into Czechoslovakia for the assassination (Operation Anthropoid) of Nazi general Reinhard Heydrich. The fountain was restored in 2018 and given Grade II listed status in July 2018.

== Funding and redevelopment ==
Since the end of the Second World War, investment in the gardens had fallen and the task of running them had passed to the Warwick District Council rather than private individuals. In the 1990s, many people felt that the gardens had lost their shine. For this reason the council began major work on the gardens in 1999 and eventually won a £3 million grant from the Heritage Lottery Fund. One of the first jobs to be completed was the removal of a children's play area by the river which was looking outdated. It was replaced by a new one in Mill Gardens near the boathouse. The aviary, which had long been disused, was turned into a cafe, and the Czech War and Jephson memorials were given a well-needed clean. The flagship development however was a sub-tropical glasshouse which contains exotic plant life, The Restaurant In The Park (which replaced an old restaurant by the old children's play area) and a teaching studio used by Warwickshire College students. In addition to these the public toilets were upgraded, the paths were resurfaced and a sensory garden was created.

In 2010, the Grade II listed building, East Lodge, at the Willes Road entrance to the park, originally built in 1846/7, was redeveloped into a sustainability visitor centre.

== Recognition ==
The investment in the gardens has proved to be worthwhile as they were voted, along with Mill Gardens, "Best Park in Britain 2004" by the Royal Horticultural Society. In 2006, the gardens won its first Green Flag award. It has won again every year until present, 2025, making 19 consecutive years. It has been voted a Green Heritage Site by English Heritage. There are also a number of Grade II listed buildings in the gardens. Most recently, the gardens have received the AS Nagra award for “Leamington Spa’s Most Outstanding Area”.

== Popular culture ==
The 1970 "Black Sabbath" world tour in support of the Black Sabbath album included a date at the Jephson Gardens pavilion on 17 May 1970. The Jephson Memorial was featured on the cover of the Ocean Colour Scene album Moseley Shoals, and the park's underpass was found on The Shapes, Songs For Sensible People. In September 2010 scenes for a BBC re-make of the TV series Upstairs, Downstairs were shot in the park.. In May 2016 the park was used as the location for the Great Day in Leamington Spa photograph featuring 92 local musicians. A year later the film You, Me and Him starring David Tennant and Lucy Punch was filmed in the park.

== See also ==
- Royal Pump Room Gardens
- Royal Pump Rooms
- Newbold Comyn
