= St Peter's Church, Leamington Spa =

St Peter's Church
- St Peter Apostle Church
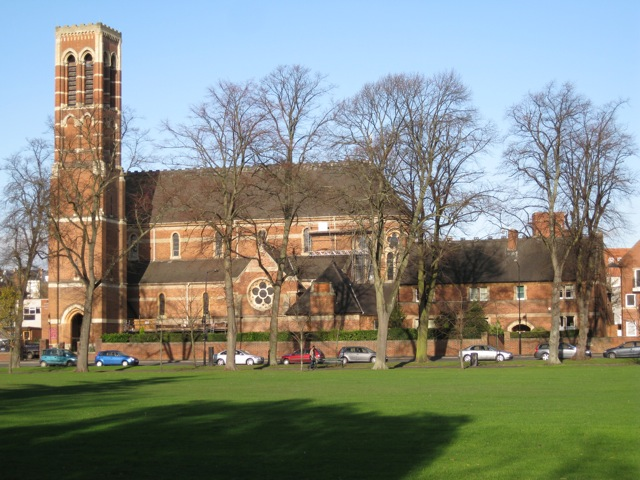
- St Peter's Church
- 52.2885°N 1.5369°W
- OS grid reference: SP 31681 65696
- Location: Leamington Spa
- Country: England
- Denomination: Roman Catholic
- Website: CatholicLeamington.org.uk

History
- Status: Parish church
- Founder: Miss Ellen France
- Dedication: Saint Peter
- Consecrated: On 17 August 1864

Architecture
- Functional status: Active
- Heritage designation: Grade II listed
- Designated: 25 March 1970
- Architect: Henry Clutton
- Style: Gothic Revival

Administration
- Province: Birmingham
- Archdiocese: Birmingham
- Deanery: Warwick
- Parish: St Peter’s & Our Lady’s

St Peter's Church or St Peter Apostle Church is a Roman Catholic parish church in Leamington Spa, Warwickshire, England. It was built in 1864 and designed by Henry Clutton in the Gothic Revival style. It is located on Dormer Place, next to the Royal Pump Room Gardens. It is a Grade II listed building.

== History ==
=== Foundation ===
In 1822, a mission was started in Leamington Spa. In 1828, from this mission a chapel was built in George Street. The chapel was named St Peter and St George's Chapel and was designed by a local architect, John Russell. It was built in the neoclassical style.

=== Construction ===
With the chapel being too small for the increasing Catholic congregation, a new larger church needed to be built. In 1864, the current church and its presbytery were built. It was designed by Henry Clutton in the Gothic Revival style and paid for by a Miss Ellen France with furnishings donated by other people. The building work was done by W. Gascoyne of Leamington. On 17 August 1864, the church was consecrated by the Bishop of Birmingham William Ullathorne. In 1877, the tower and spire were built. The bells were cast by Messrs W. Blews & Sons of Birmingham.

=== Developments ===
In December 1883, the nave roof, organ, and a lot of the interior was destroyed in a fire. Restoration was done by G. H. Cox of Birmingham. In November 1884, the church was reopened. In 1894, the chapel on the north transept was added. It was designed by A. J. Pilkington and A. E Purdie.

== Parish ==
St Peter's Church shares a parish priest with the parish of Our Lady in Lillington. Our Lady's Church was built in 1963, to designs by architect Henry Fedeski. It is also a Grade II listed building, notable for its dalle de verre windows designed by Dom Charles Norris. The two churches also work with St Joseph's Church in Whitnash. St Peter's Church has three Sunday Masses at 5:00pm on Saturday, and at 9:00am and 11:00am on Sunday.

== Interior ==
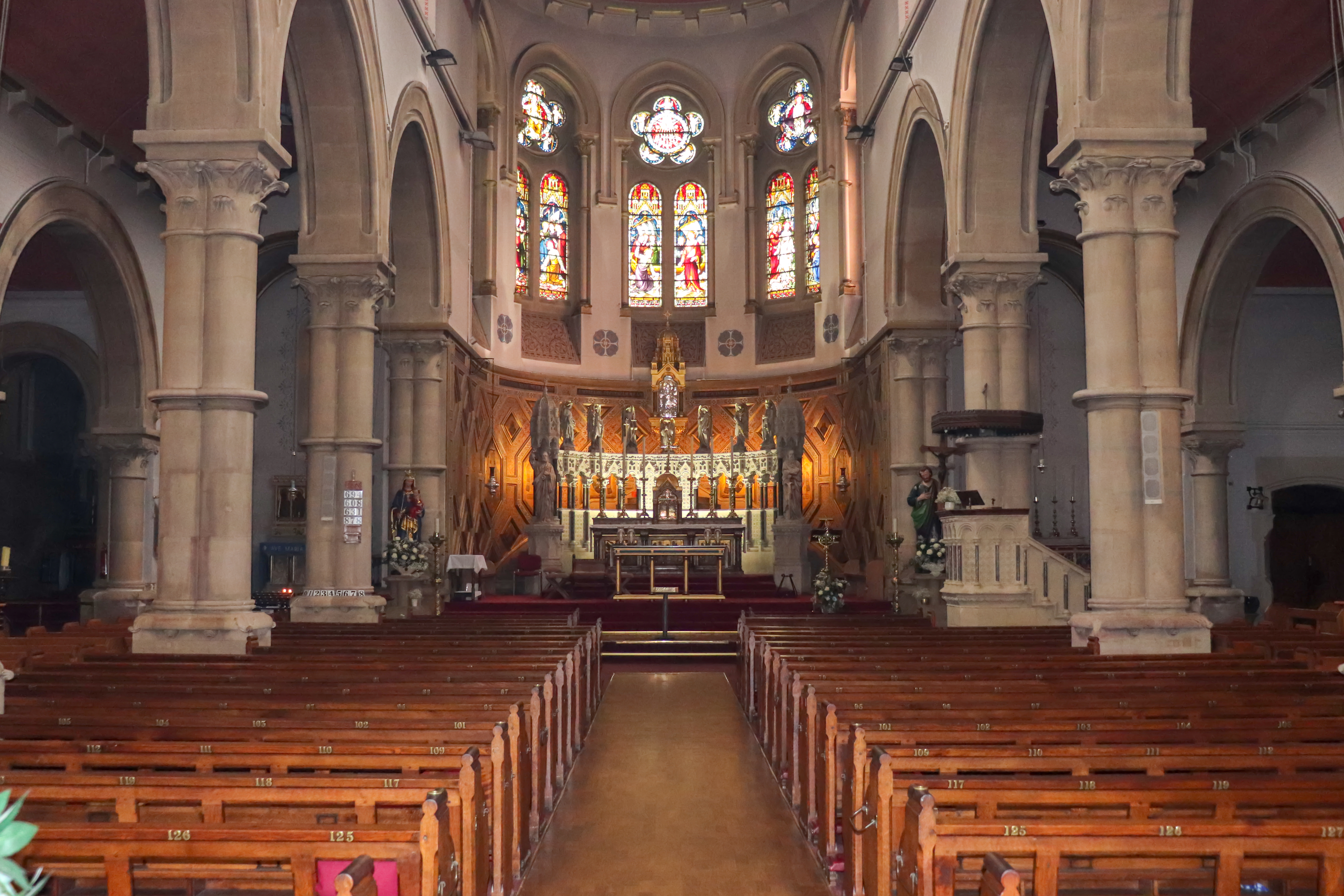

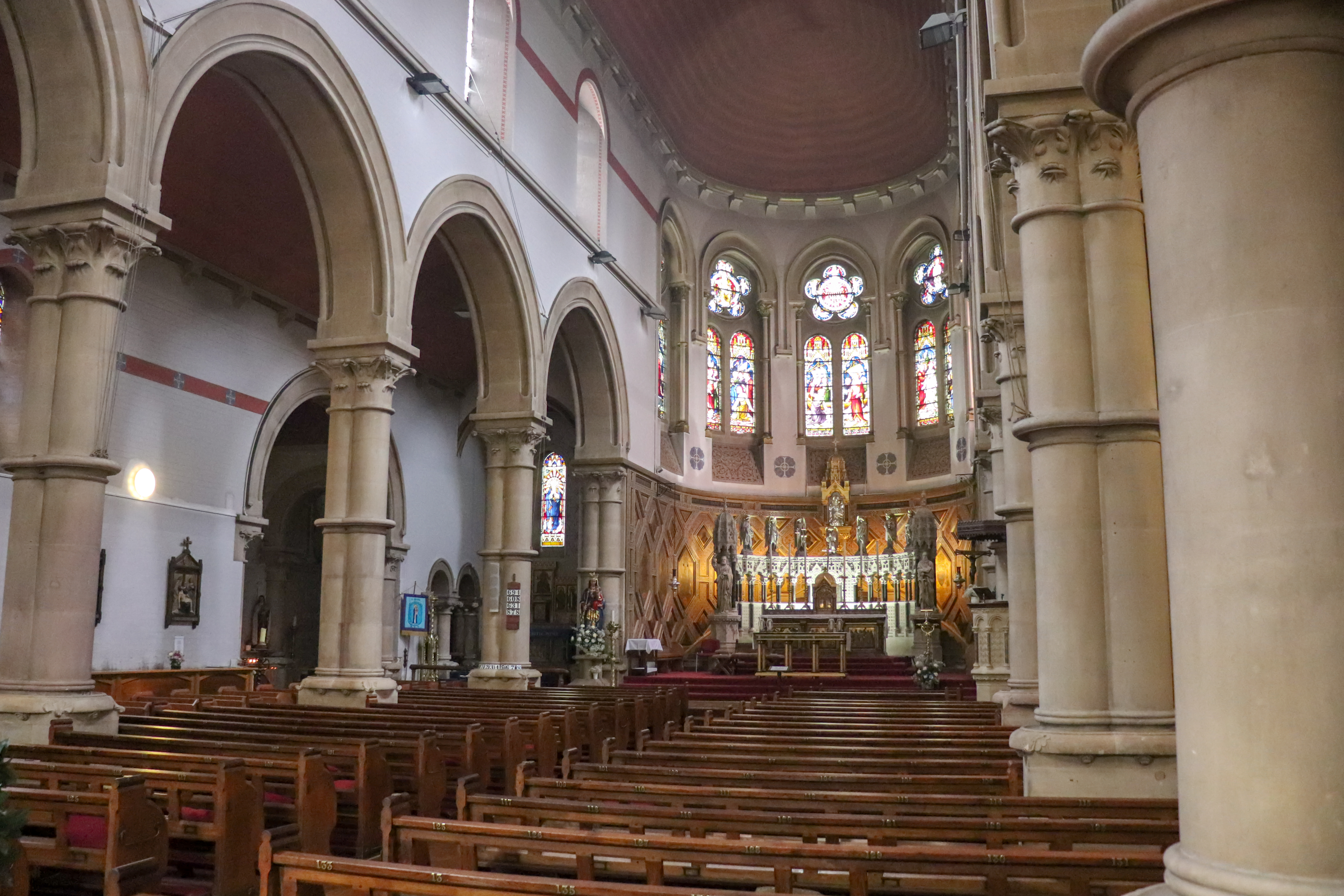

== See also ==
- Archdiocese of Birmingham
