= St Mary Magdalene's Church, Lillington =

Coordinates: 52.3031°N 1.5252°W

- Lillington Parish Church
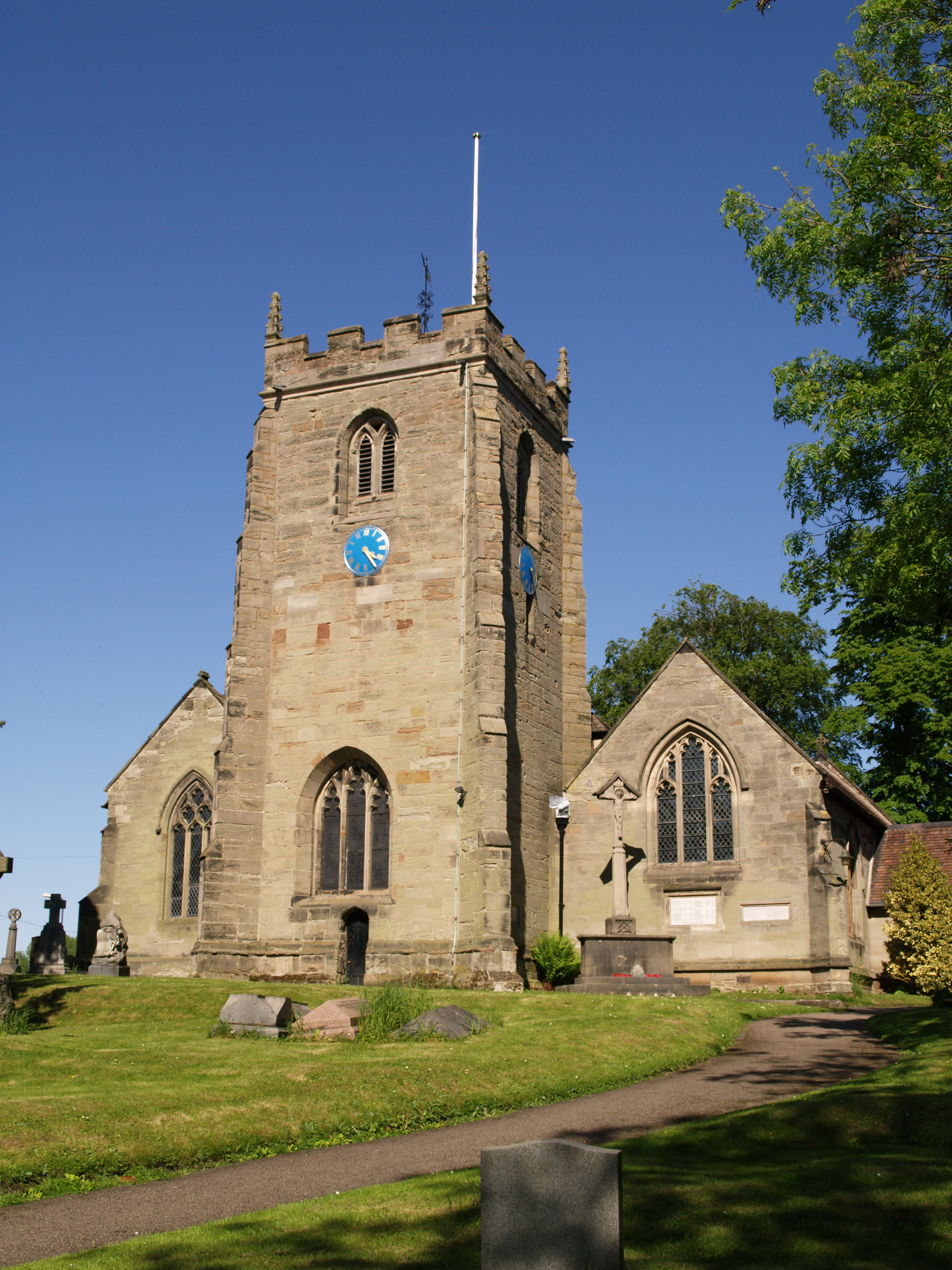
- The church from the west
- St Mary Magdalene's Church, Lillington
- OS grid reference: SP 32471 67332
- Location: Vicarage Road, Lillington, Warwickshire, CV32 7RH
- Country: England
- Denomination: Church of England
- Churchmanship: Central

History
- Status: Active
- Dedication: St Mary Magdalene

Architecture
- Functional status: Parish church
- Heritage designation: Grade II listed
- Designated: 1 March 1949

Administration
- Diocese: Diocese of Coventry
- Archdeaconry: Archdeaconry of Warwick
- Deanery: Warwick and Leamington
- Parish: Lillington

Clergy
- Vicar: The Revd William Smith

St Mary Magdalene's Church, Lillington is the Church of England parish church of Lillington, Warwickshire, a part of Royal Leamington Spa with a population of about 11,000. The church is at the junction of Vicarage Road and Church Lane. It has been a Grade II listed building since 1949.

== History ==
The earliest surviving parts of the present building are the possibly pre-Conquest doorway now located between the Lady Chapel and Sacristy, and the south wall of the chancel. The Perpendicular Gothic west tower is 15th century, built in about 1480.

The remainder of the church is Victorian, built or rebuilt between 1847 and 1884.

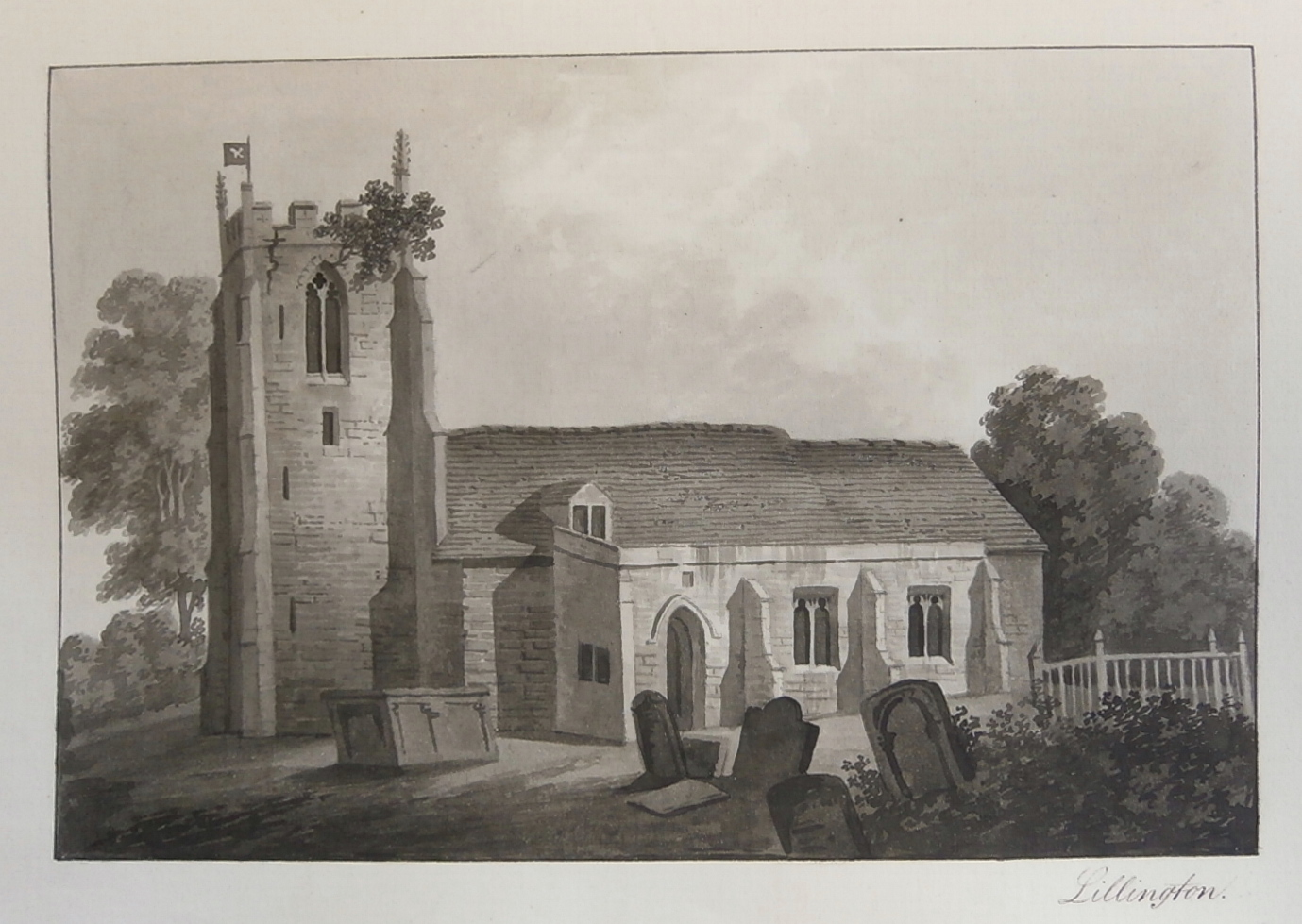
Lillington Church about 1805

The old south aisle was extended and the north aisle added in 1847. The south aisle was then demolished and a wider aisle built in 1868. Dormer windows were inserted in the roof in 1875. In 1884 the chancel, apart from the south wall, was rebuilt and the Lady chapel and Sacristy on the north side of the chancel were added, the Romanesque doorway being relocated for the second time since 1847. Three of the stained glass windows are by C.E. Kempe and Company: the east window of the south aisle (1895) and two windows in the north aisle (1908 and 1920). A choir vestry was added in 1914. The pulpit is 20th century, designed by T. Lawrence Dale. A detached octagonal meeting room in the churchyard was built in 1987.

Benjamin Satchwell, co-founder, promoter and poet of the spa at nearby Leamington, married Mary Whitmore in this church on 23 April 1764.

In the churchyard, opposite the vestry door, is the famous 'Miser's Grave'. The headstone of William Treen, who died aged 77 on 3 February 1810, carries this inscription, quoted in many nineteenth-century guides to Leamington, and most famously by Nathaniel Hawthorne in Our Old Home in 1863:

"I Poorly Liv'd and Poorly Dy'd,
Poorly Bury'd and no one Cry'd."

== Bells ==
The church has a ring of eight bells. The sixth bell is attributed to Thomas Harrys of London, cast about 1480, which makes it contemporary with the tower. The seventh bell was cast in 1625 by Watts of Leicester, and the tenor in 1675 by Henry Bagley of Chacombe, Northamptonshire. Mears and Stainbank of the Whitechapel Bell Foundry cast the remaining five bells in 1927. The bells were re-hung by Nicholson Engineering of Bridport, Dorset in 2007.

== Clock ==
Lillington church clock was made by Potts of Leeds and installed in 1897. It seems that the tower had no clock before then. The clock was renovated, the four dials repainted and gilded, and the mechanism repositioned within the ringing chamber, by the Cumbria Clock Company of Penrith in 2007.

== See also ==
- Lillington Free Church
