= Eden Court, Leamington Spa =

1960s tower block in Warwickshire, England

Coordinates: 52.3005°N 1.5095°W

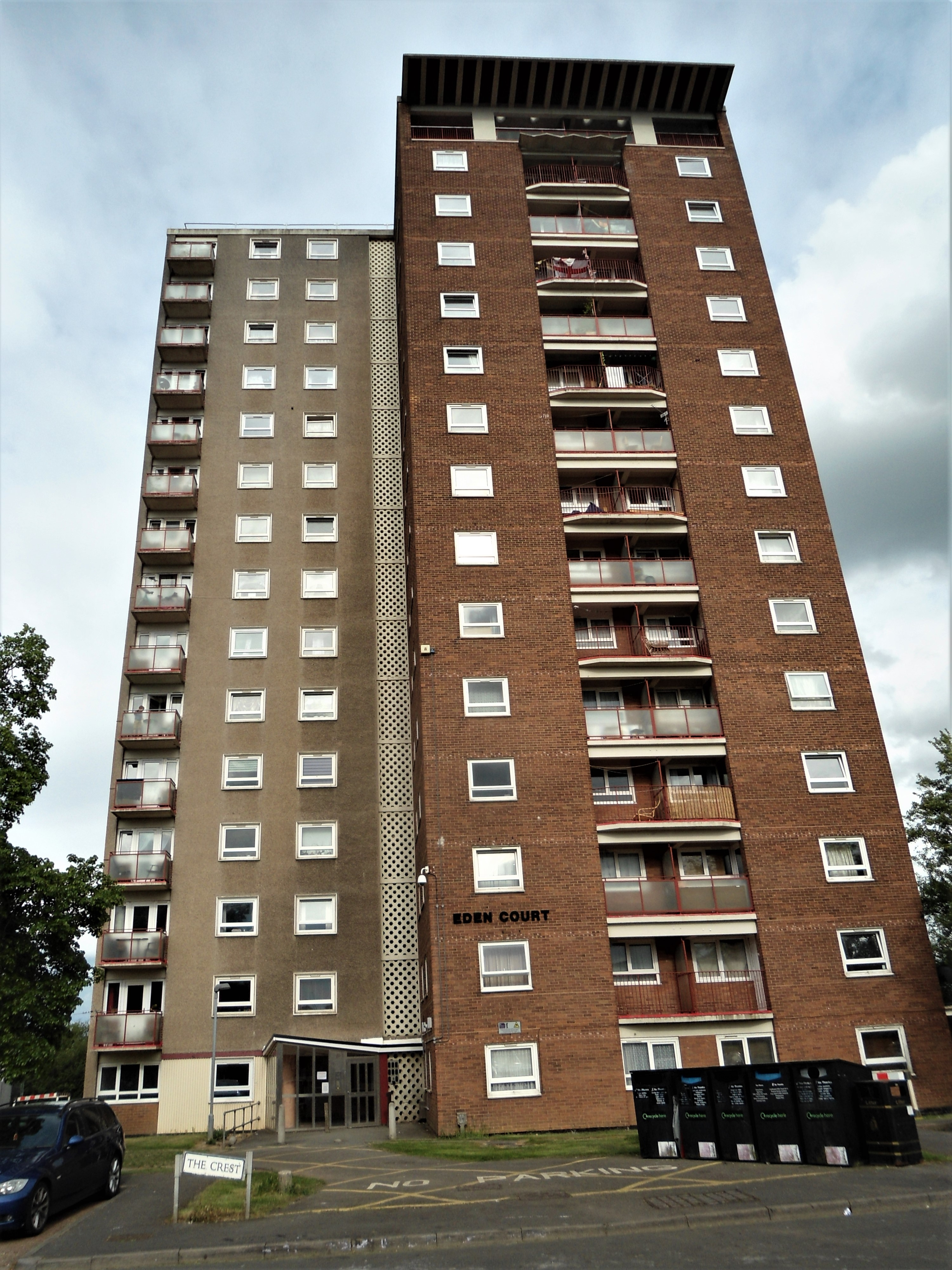
The block in 2019

Eden Court is a high-rise residential building belonging to Warwick District Council located in Lillington, Leamington Spa, England.

== Building ==
Construction on the 41 m (135 ft), 14 storey, block of flats began in 1959 and was completed the following year. The tower was constructed by the former Royal Leamington Spa Borough Council at the same time as a wider development known as The Crest. The area also comprises the eight storey Ashton Court and the seven storey Southorn Court and low rise housing. A public house named the Jack and Jill was opened in 1966 to serve the area, along with a convenience store. The pub was closed in 1996 but the shop remains. The 67 bus route operated by Stagecoach links the area to Cubbington and Leamington town centre.

In March 2015 a proposal to demolish the block and many of the surrounding ones was considered by the council executive. The idea was to build new low rise buildings in their place. However the proposal was abandoned after a facilitating development on adjoining Green Belt land at Red House Farm was rejected by the Government Inspector and deleted from the Warwick District Local Plan in 2017.
