= Lillington Free Church =

Church in Leamington Spa, Warwickshire, England

Coordinates: 52.3045°N 1.5205°W

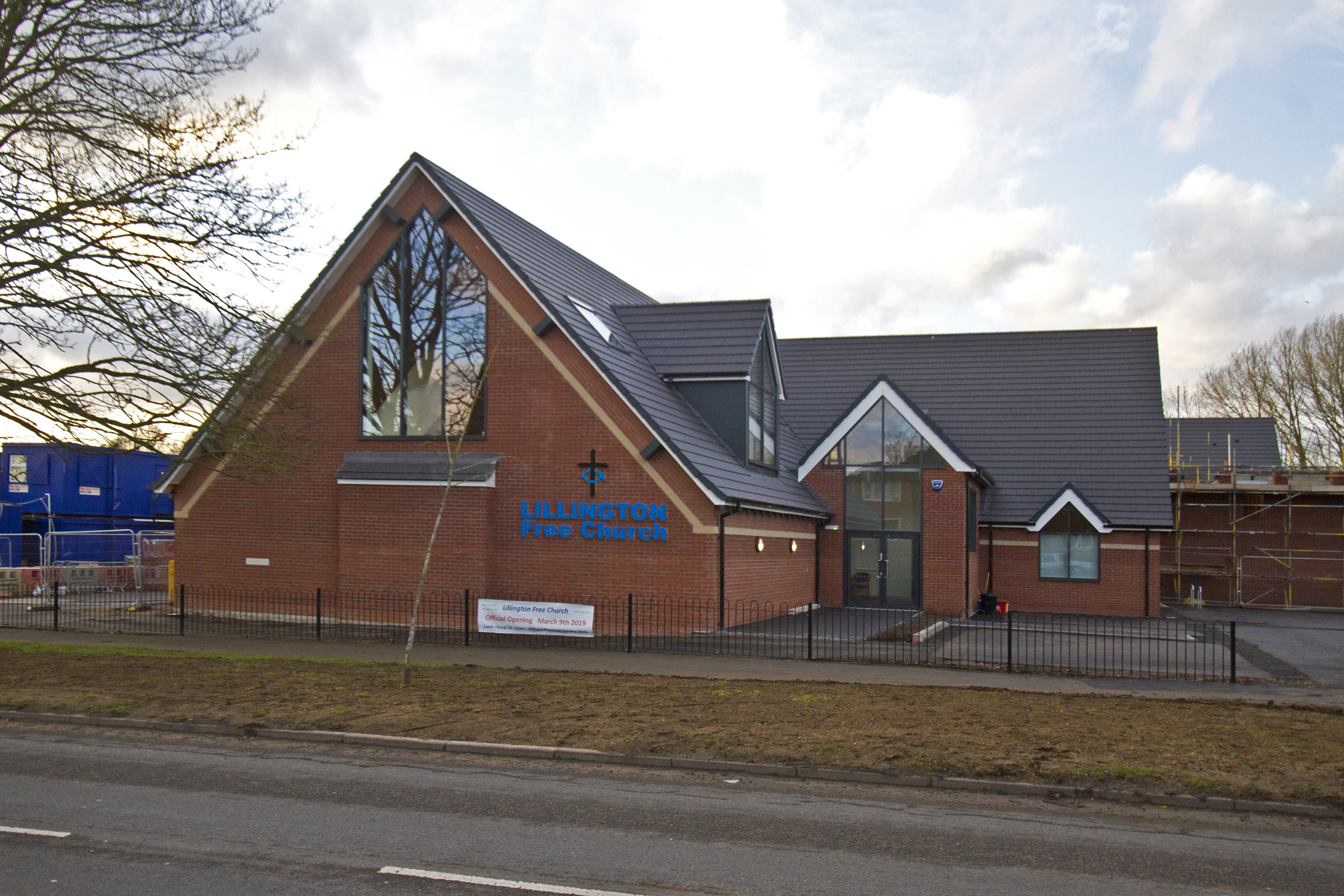
Lillington Free Church's new building opened on 9 March 2019

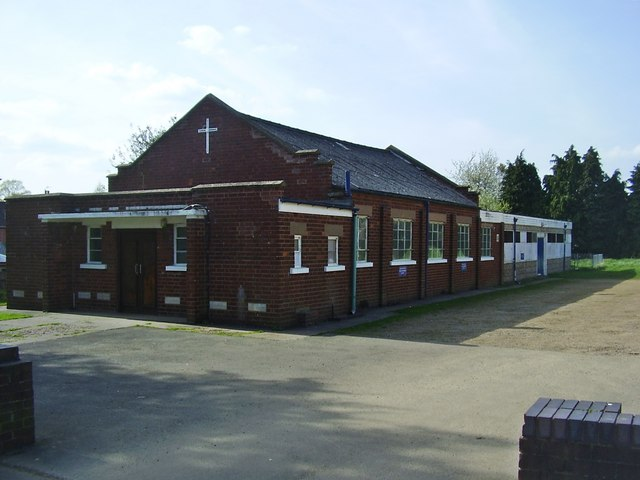
The now demolished 1954 hall in 2011

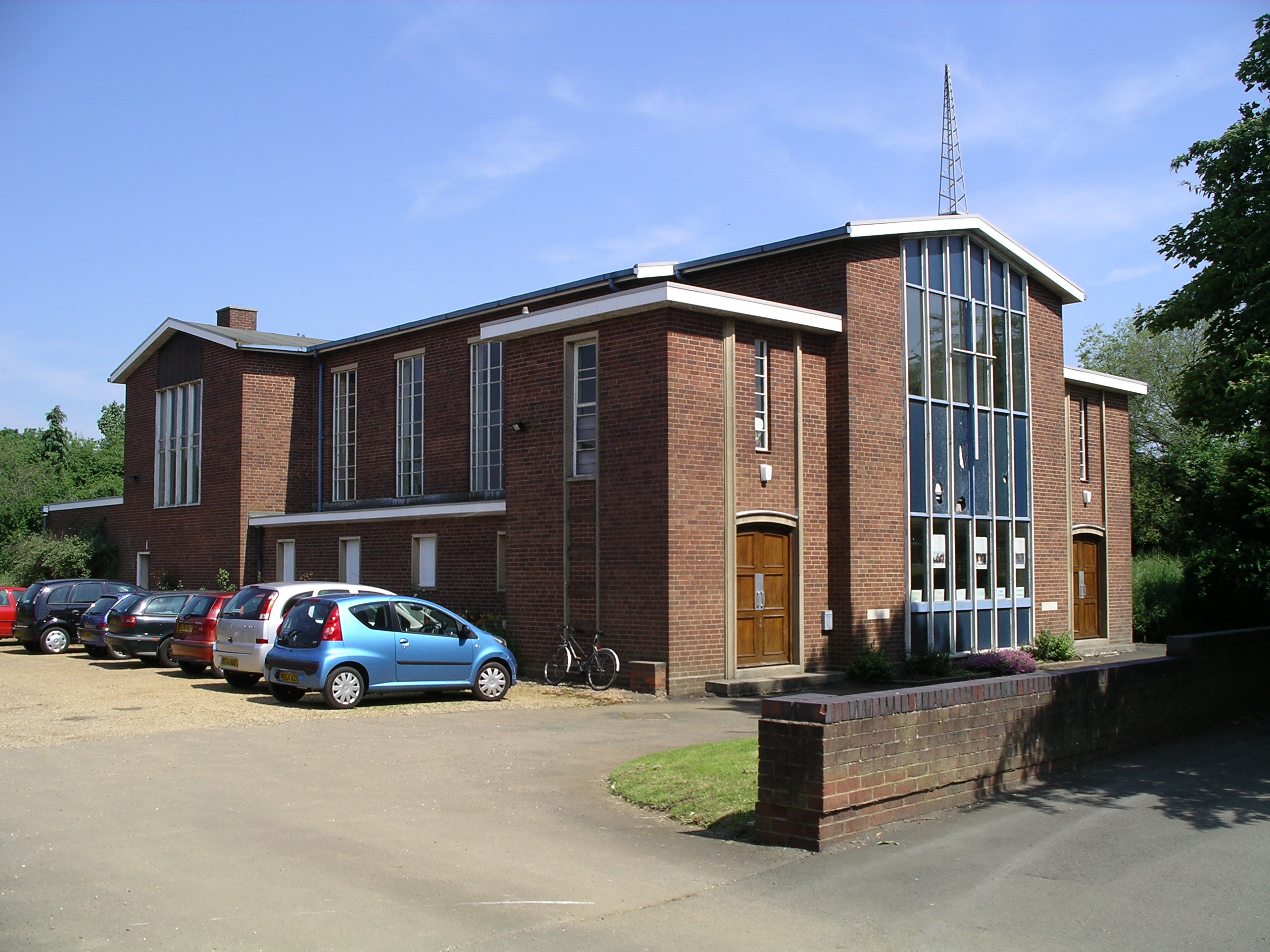
The now demolished 1966 church in 2008

Lillington Free Church is a free church located in Lillington, Leamington Spa, England. As of July 2024, the current Minister is Reverend Nick Stanyon, who is assisted in running the church by ordained elders elected by the church members. As well as traditional Sunday worship weekly events include sunday school, Rainbows, Brownies, Girl Guides, table tennis, coffee mornings and toddler cafe. Like all other Free Churches it has a certain degree of autonomy, although it and its Minister ultimately answer to the national General Assembly. The quarterly church magazine is named The Link.

== History ==
=== 20th century ===
The history of the church began in 1948 when the main free church denominations in the nearby town of Leamington Spa, the Baptists, Methodists and Congregationalists, realised the need to provide meeting places for the number outside of the town proper. The Congregationalists were given the responsibility of Lillington and quickly purchased a site of 1,550 square yards on Cubbington Road for £150. Whilst funds were being raised to construct a suitable building on that site the Free Church met at a nearby Women's Institute building, the first time being 6 January 1952. Planning permission was granted in 1953 for a £3,000, 180 person capacity church on the Cubbington Road site. Foundations stones were laid on 27 June 1953 and the church was officially opened for worship on 30 January 1954 with a service led by its first minister the Reverend D.Gibbons. As well as the main worship area there was a foyer, cloakroom and toilets at the front and a vestry and kitchen at the rear.

By 1959 it was already becoming clear that the existing building was too small for activities, especially the sunday school, so a new building committee was set up. Further land adjacent to the site was purchased for £200 and by 1963 plans were put in for a much larger new church. The first sod was cut for these schemes on 10 April 1965 with expected costs of £28,000. Whilst the presence of an old gravel pit initially hampered work the first service at the new church took place on 3 September 1966. It contained foyer, cloakroom, toilets, main hall and vestry and was much taller than the old church. The 1954 church at that point took on the role of a church hall with the vestry being removed and the kitchen extended.

On 21 June 1972 the Congregational Church in England and Wales who had opened the church and the Presbyterian Church of England were combined to create the United Reformed Church. Although technically a URC the one in Lillington still maintains the name Free Church. That year also saw the foundation of the Lillington Free Church Table Tennis Club. Two of the most successful graduates of the club are Commonwealth Games medal winner Kelly Sibley and World Dwarf Games silver medalist Alex O'Driscoll.

By the early 1970s the 1954 hall, which was being used by the sunday school, Boy Scouts and Girl Guides amongst other things, was again too small for purpose. On 23 March 1974 a large extension was opened to the rear consisting of a games room, coffee bar, stage area, a small committee room and new toilets.

=== 21st century ===
In September 2017 planning permission was granted for the demolition of both churches and the erection of a new church. Orbit Homes completed the work and as payment the Free Church is giving land to Orbit, on which they have permission to build 25 homes, a percentage of which will be affordable housing.

The final service in the 1966 church was held on 26 November 2017. The introduction to the service was given by the Reverend James Church whilst the main service was led by Reverend John Carrier, minister in 1966. The church was demolished in March 2018 and the older church was kept whilst the new one was being built. The first Sunday service was held in the new church on 20 January 2019, with the official opening taking place on 9 March that year. It comfortably holds 80 people and includes a foyer, toilets, main hall with stage, vestry, an office for the reverend, and a creche/committee room. Public transport to the church is via the Stagecoach bus route 67.
