= Church of Our Lady, Lillington =

Catholic Church in Leamington Spa, England

Church of Our Lady
- The Church of Our Lady, Lillington
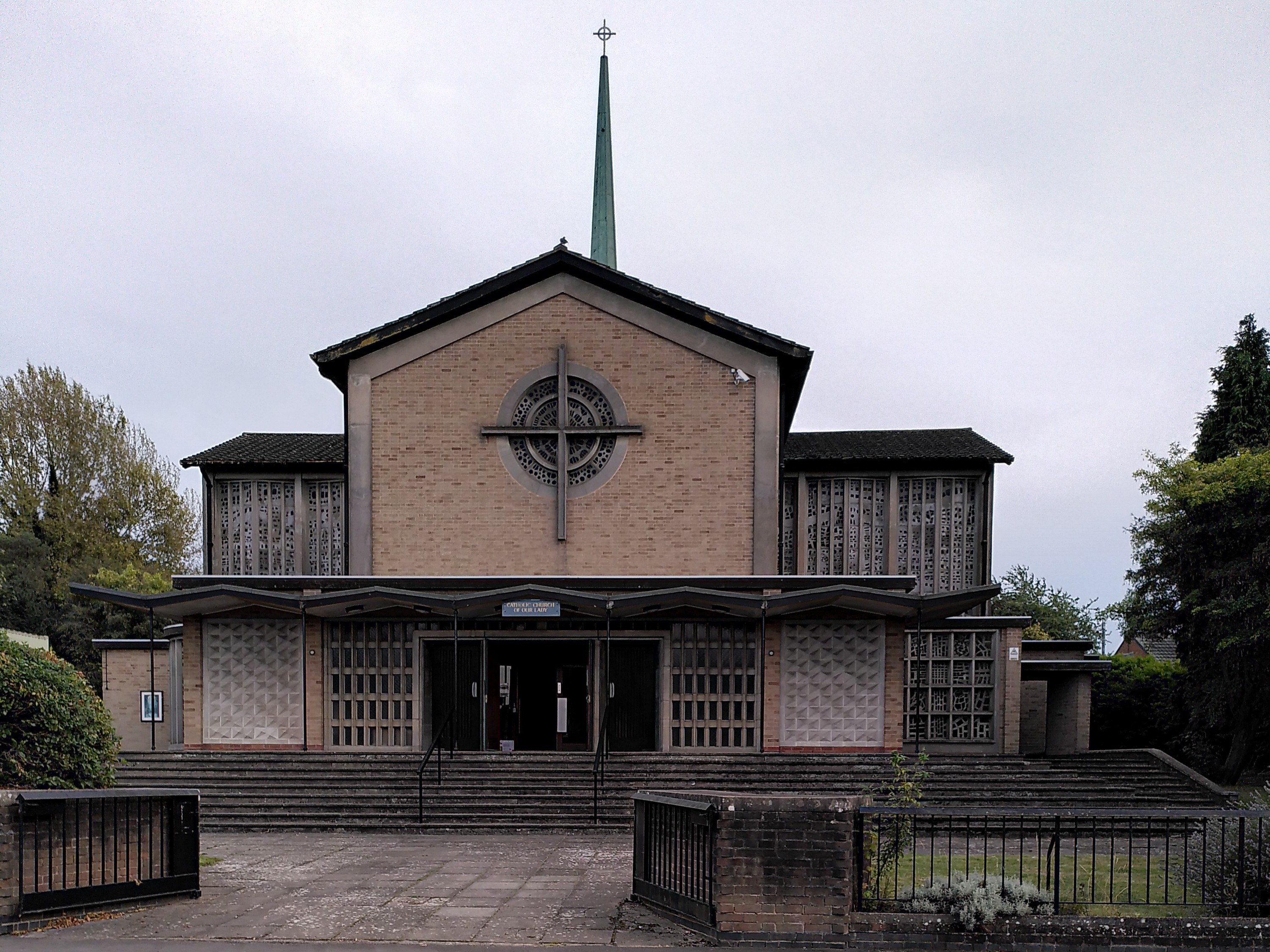
- Exterior of Our Lady's Church

- Location within Warwickshire
- 52.301899°N 1.5169501°W
- OS grid reference: SP 33030 67193
- Location: Lillington, Leamington Spa, Warwickshire
- Country: England
- Denomination: Roman Catholic
- Tradition: Catholic

History
- Status: Active

Architecture
- Functional status: Active
- Heritage designation: Grade II listed
- Architect: Henry Fedeski
- Style: 20th Century
- Years built: 1962–3

Administration
- Province: Birmingham
- Archdiocese: Birmingham
- Deanery: Banbury & Warwick

Clergy
- Priest: Fr. Stephen Day

The Church of Our Lady, Lillington is a Roman Catholic church in Lillington, Leamington Spa, Warwickshire, England, dating from 1963. It is a Grade II listed building, chiefly notable for its extensive scheme of dalle de verre glass, designed by Dom Charles Norris, and for works by Steven Sykes.

== Design ==
The church was built between 1962 and 1963 by Garlick & Sons Ltd of Coventry, to designs of Henry Fedeski. The plan is cruciform with the altar situated centrally at the crossing, reflecting the values of the Liturgical Movement immediately prior to the Second Vatican Council.

There is a Lady Chapel in the (liturgical) southeast corner of the building, together with a Baptstery on the north side, and a small mothers' and babies' chapel on the south. The church entrances are to the west and north, each with a narthex.

A central sanctuary which rises three steps forms the setting for the altar, which has a mensa (or altar stone) of 4-inch thick Nabresina Roman stone marble. Dark green Westmorland slate columns support the mensa and communion rails.

The baptistery is circular, one step down from the nave, and contains a circular font in Ancaster stone with a bronze base. The motif represents Alpha and Omega. There is a copper bowl which is removable to enable the baptismal water to be kept in the sanctuary for the Easter season. The cover is made of teak.

== Glass ==
At clerestory level the church walls are almost entirely of dalle de verre (slab glass) set in concrete, designed by Dom Charles Norris of Buckfast Abbey and manufactured at Prinknash Abbey. The artist's aim was to create a mixed figurative and abstract iconographic scheme on a heroic scale, exploring the theme of the Incarnation. At ground floor level there is further glass: the Baptistery has windows depicting in abstract form the Spirit and the water and the blood (cf. 1 John 5: 7-8), while the Lady Chapel has figurative depictions of traditional Marian titles and the small chapel to the south of the nave symbols of the Passion.

== Works by Steven Sykes ==
The church has no east window: in its place is a glass mosaic designed and executed by Steven Sykes, who had created the Gethsemane Chapel at Basil Spence's nearby Coventry Cathedral; it consists of the Chi-Rho symbol above an Alpha and Omega motif.

In addition, the church contains fourteen Stations of the Cross in Modernist bas-relief form cast in moulded fibreglass, installed around 1965. Stylistically these are closely similar to other works in this form by Sykes, and several bear the initials S.S.

== Gallery ==
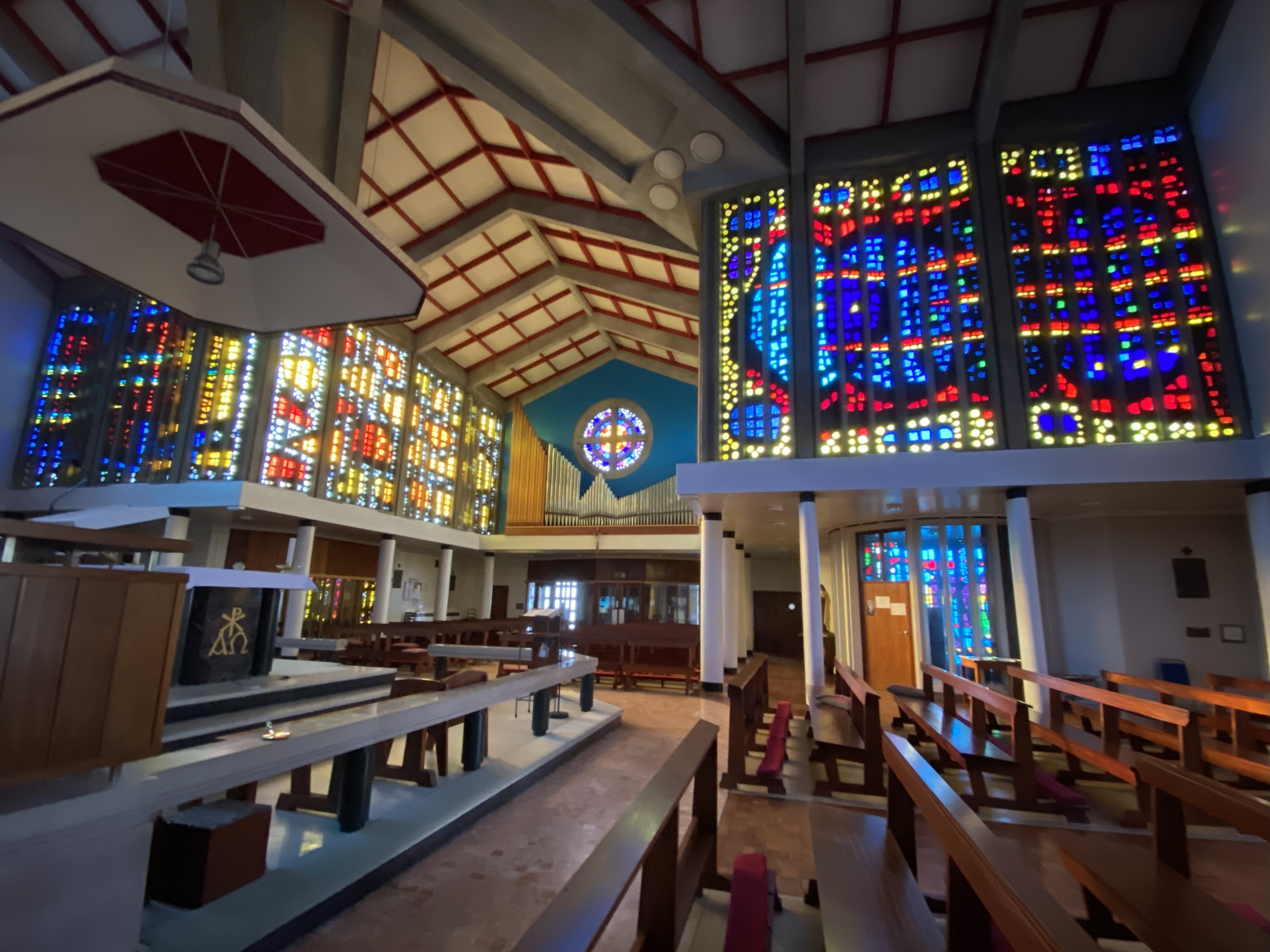

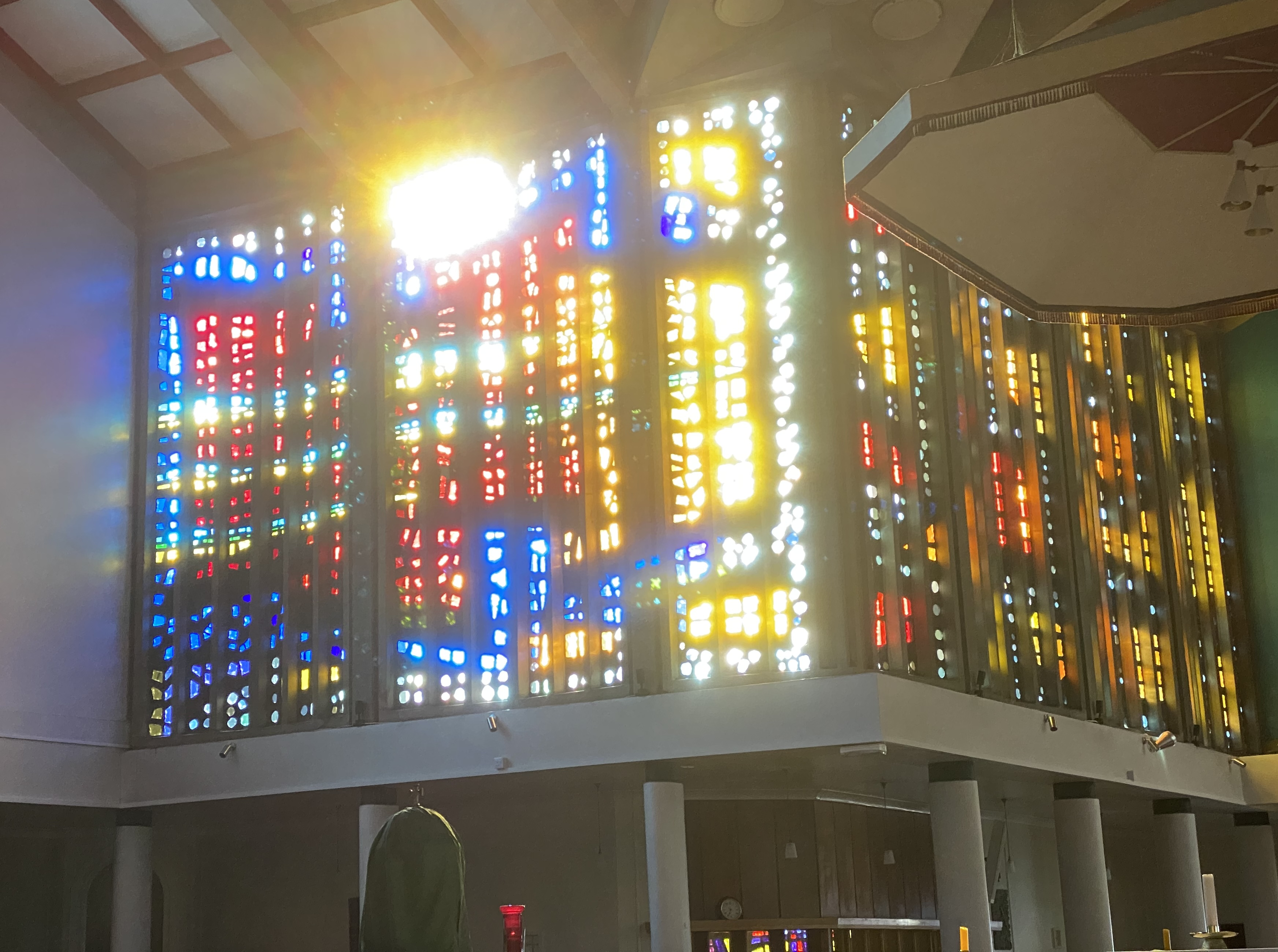

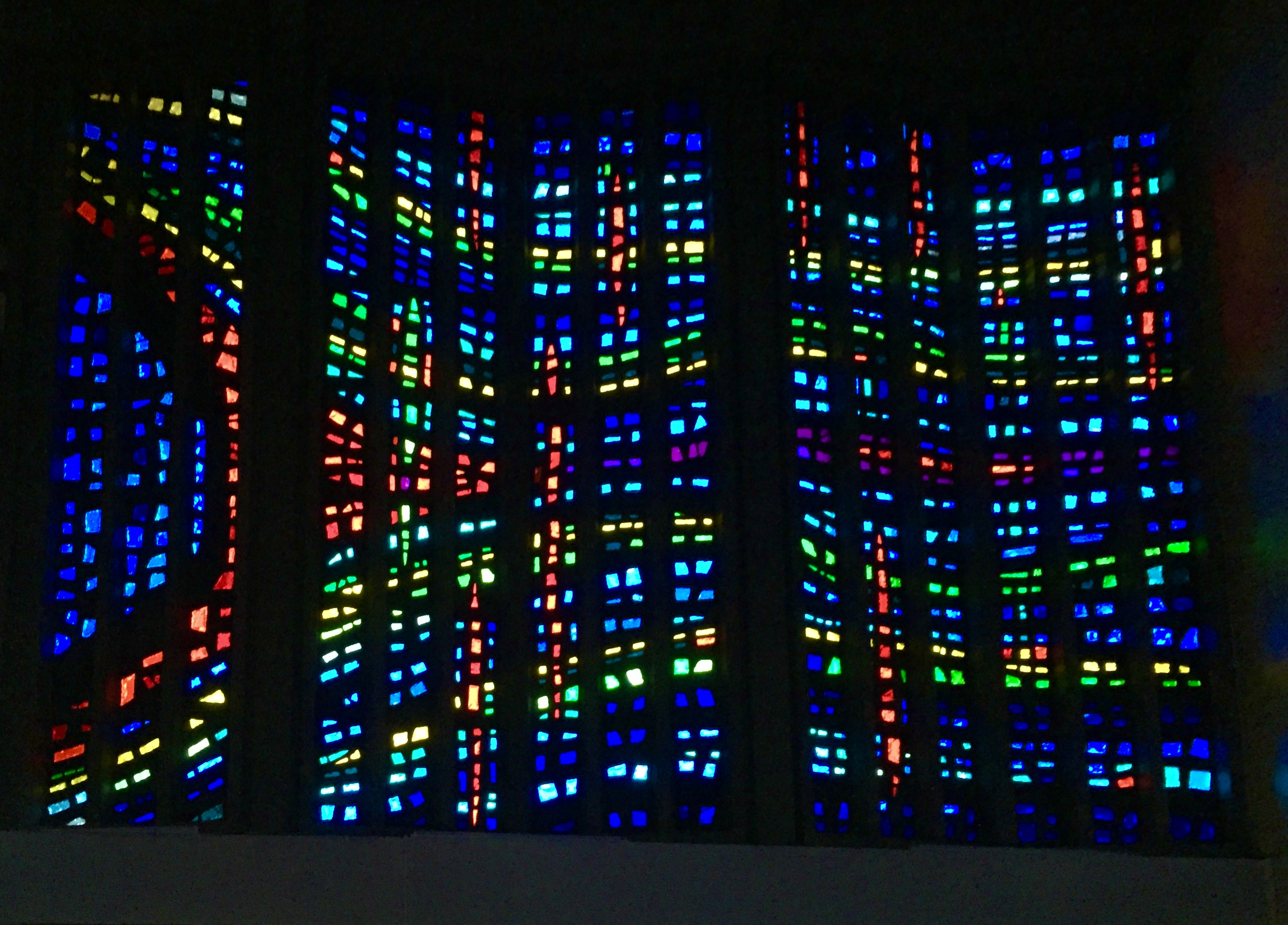

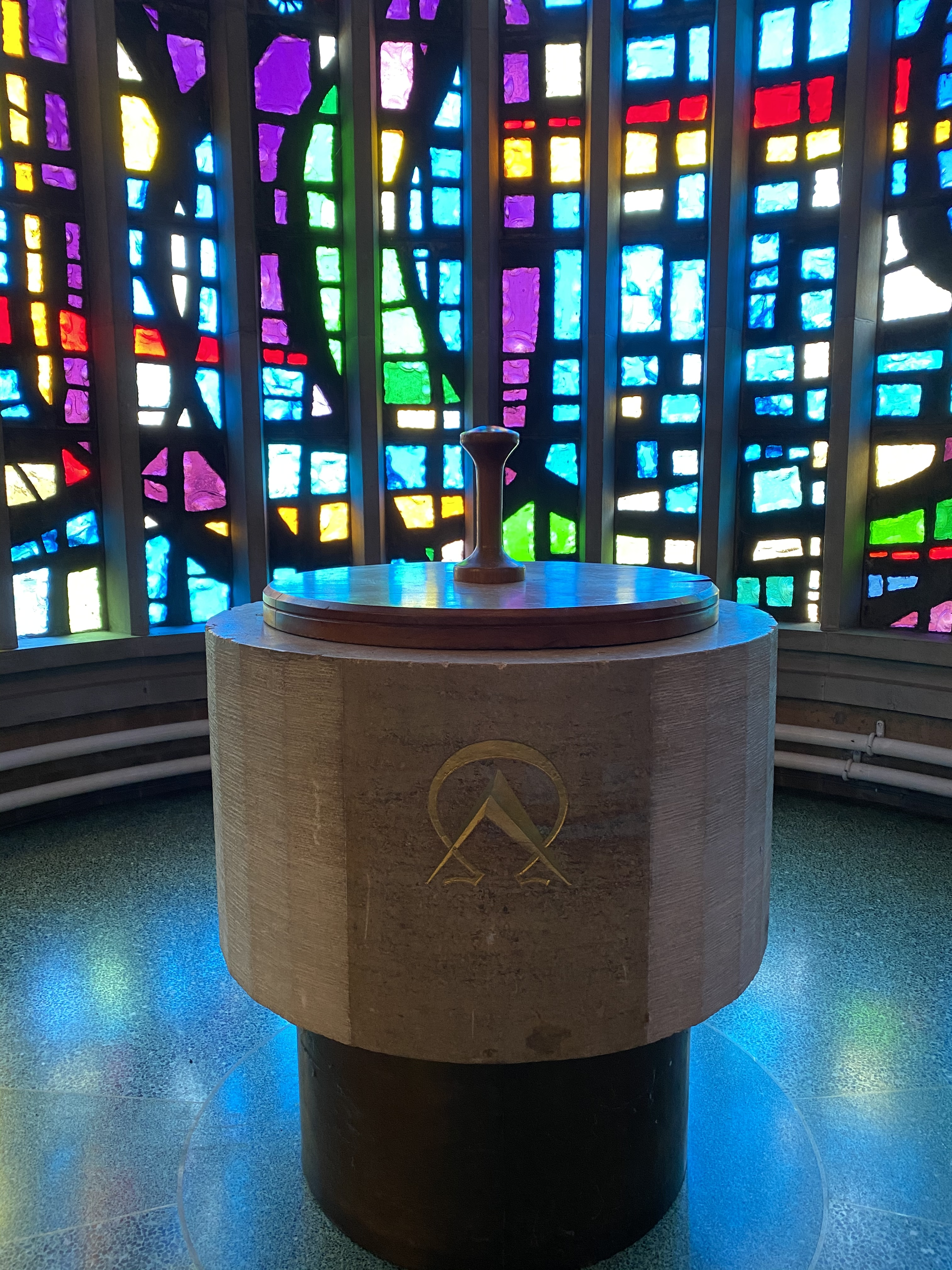

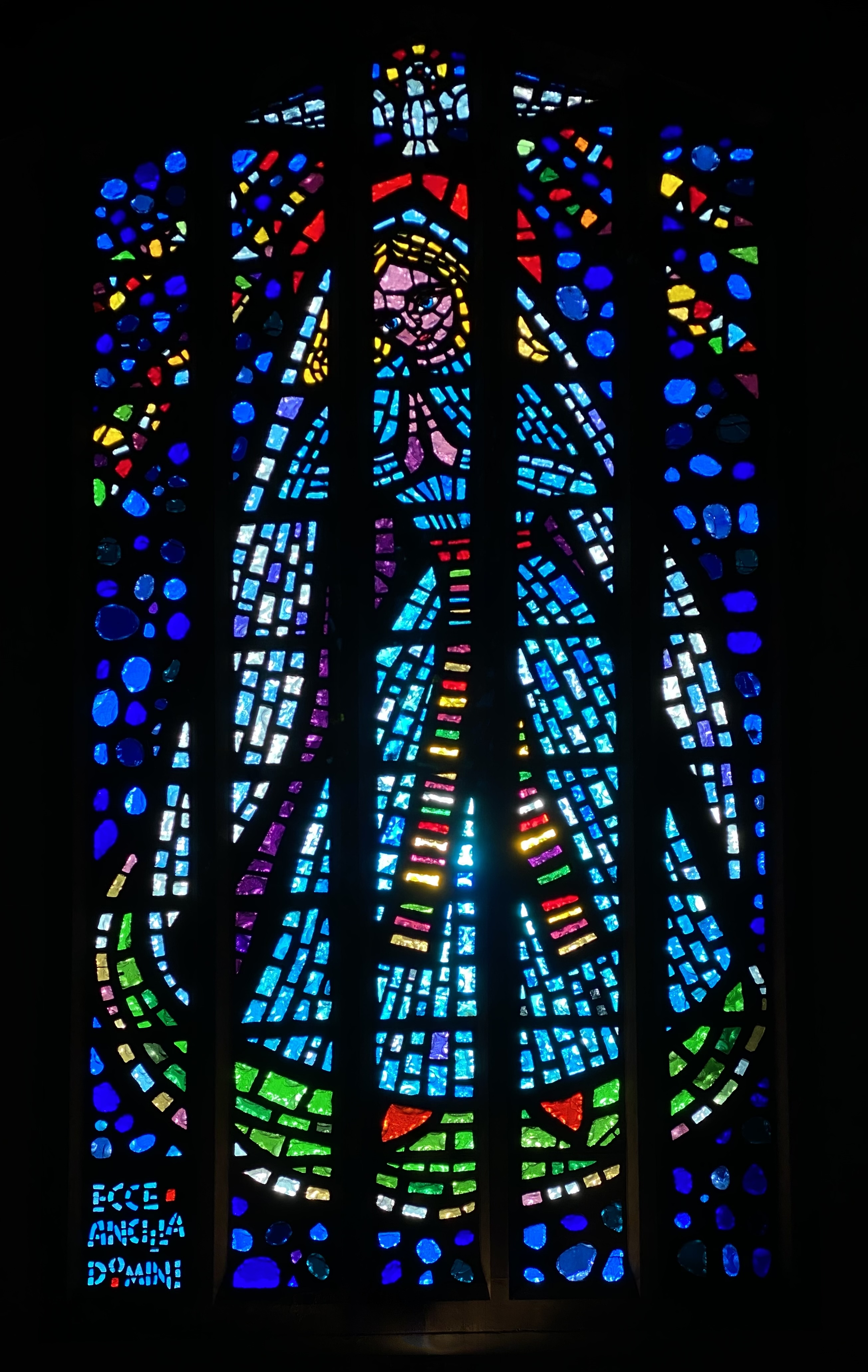

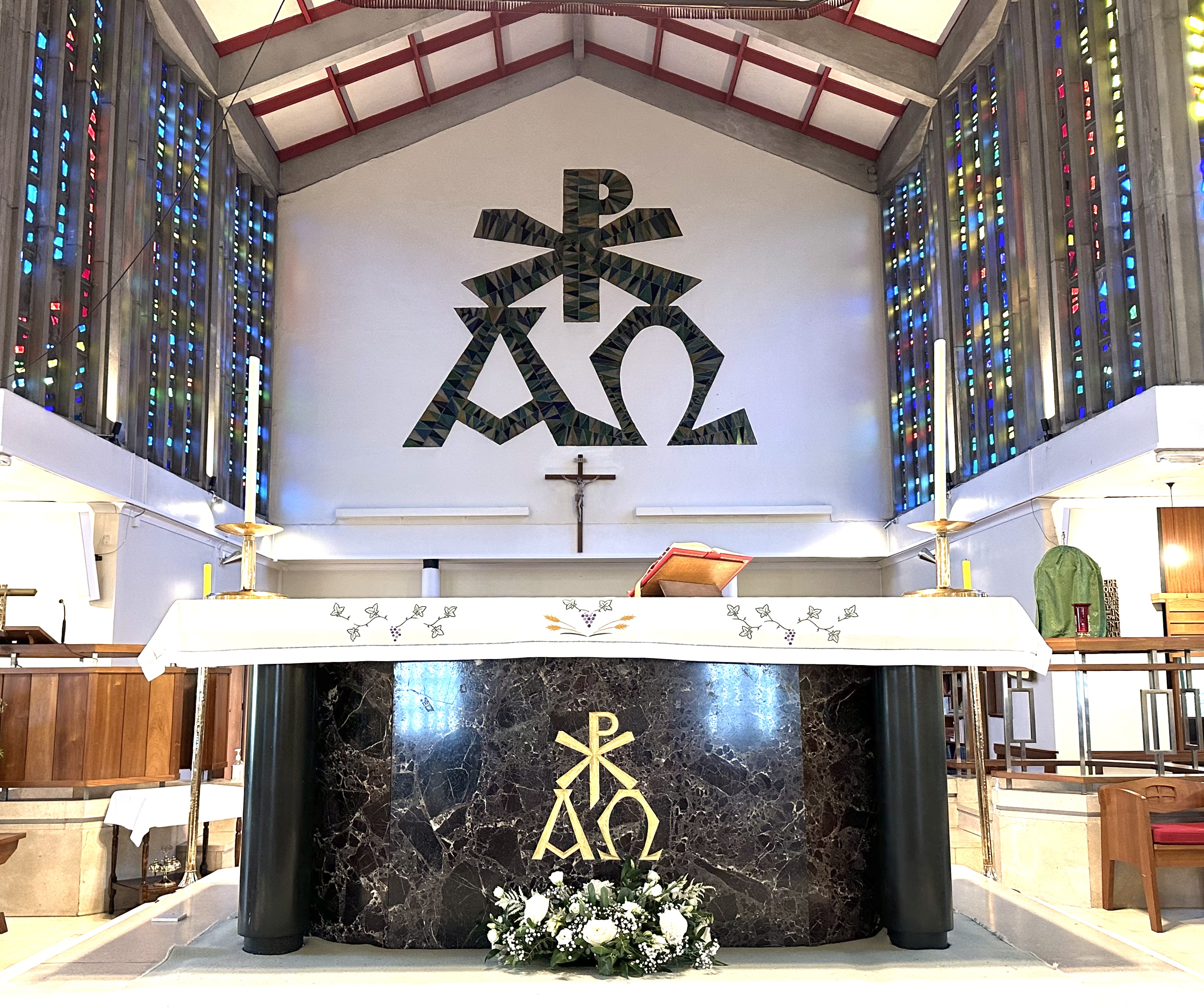

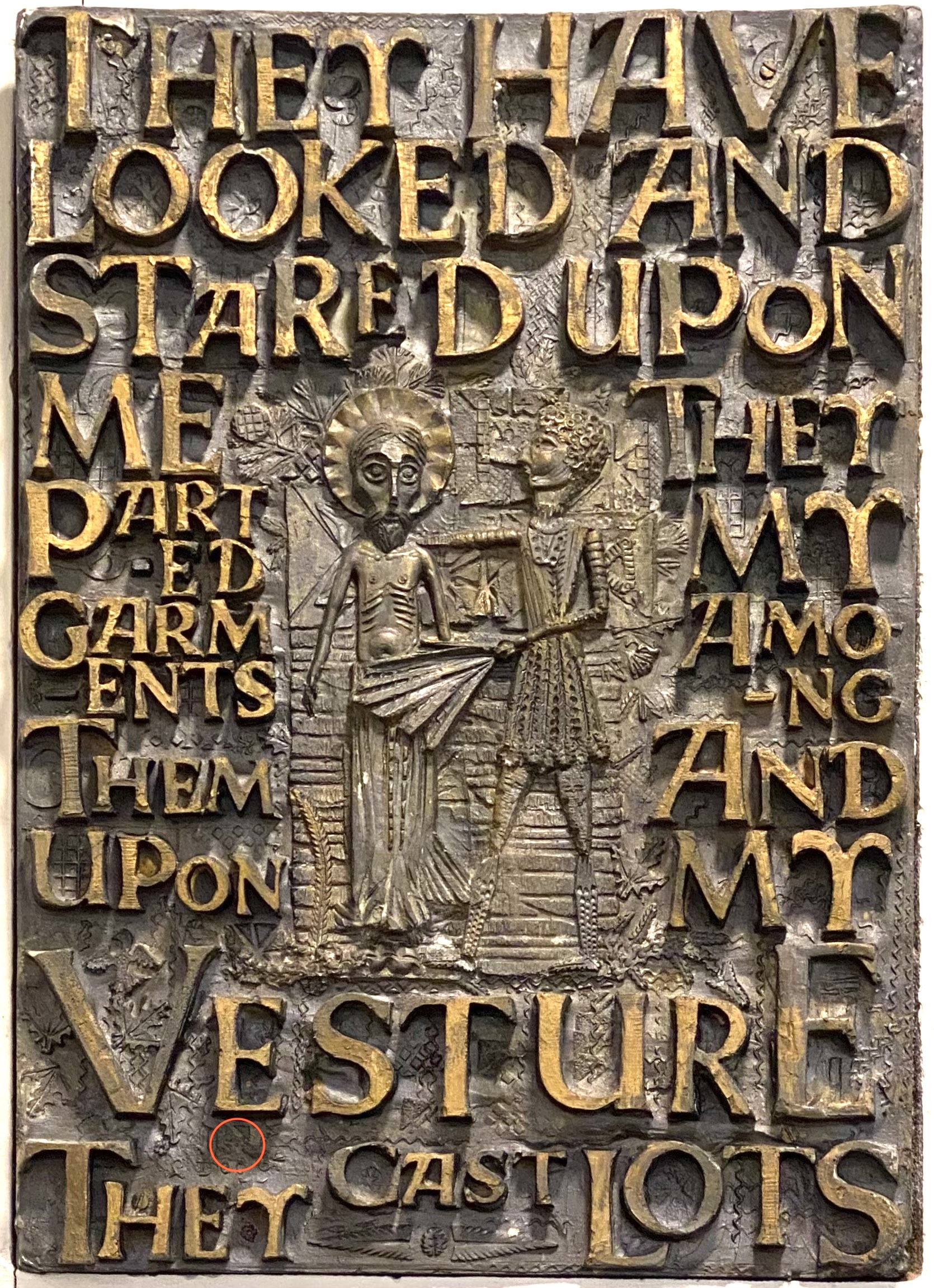

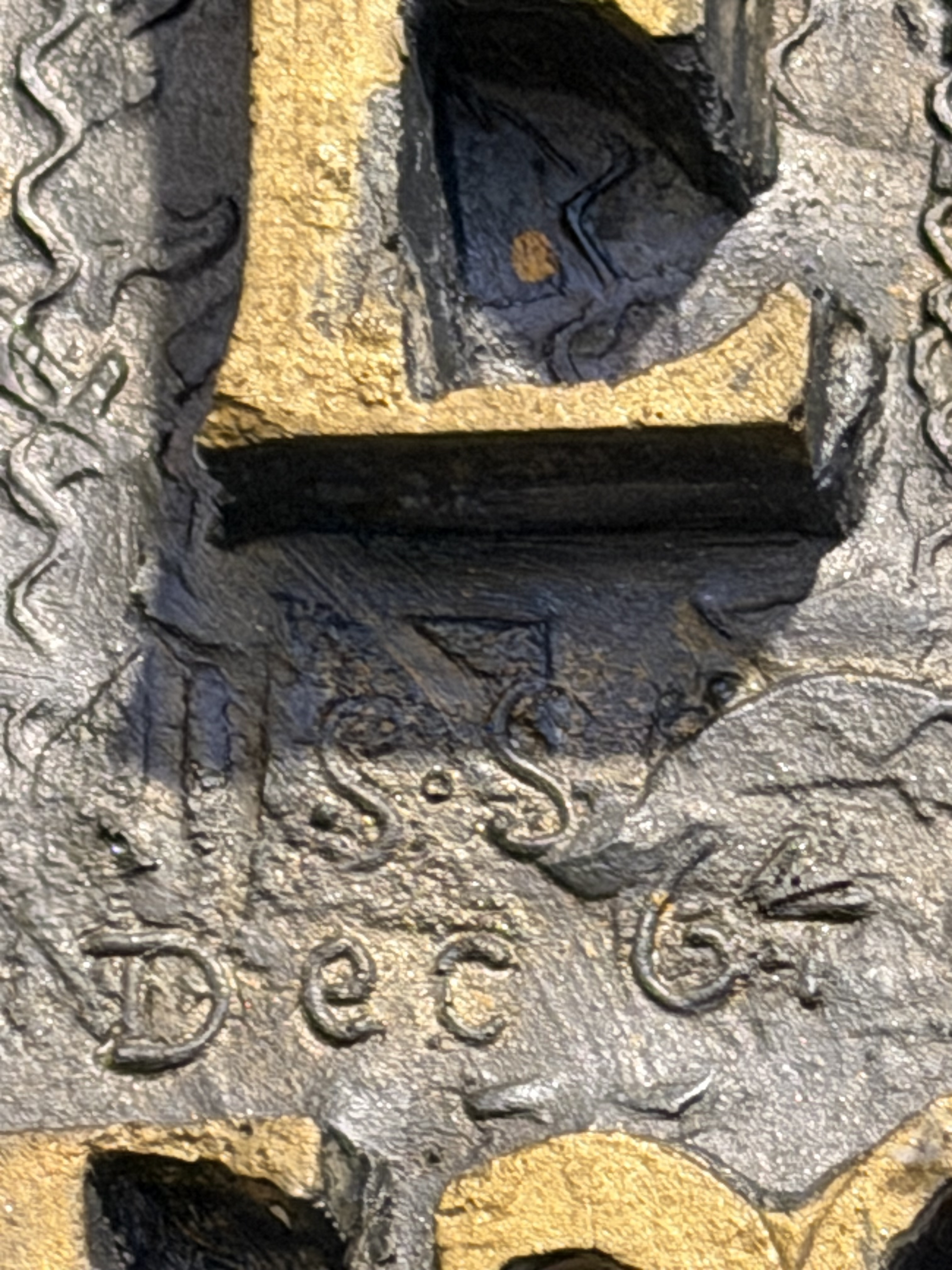
