= Lillington, Warwickshire =

Suburb of Leamington Spa, England

Coordinates: 52.3006°N 1.5183°W

Lillington
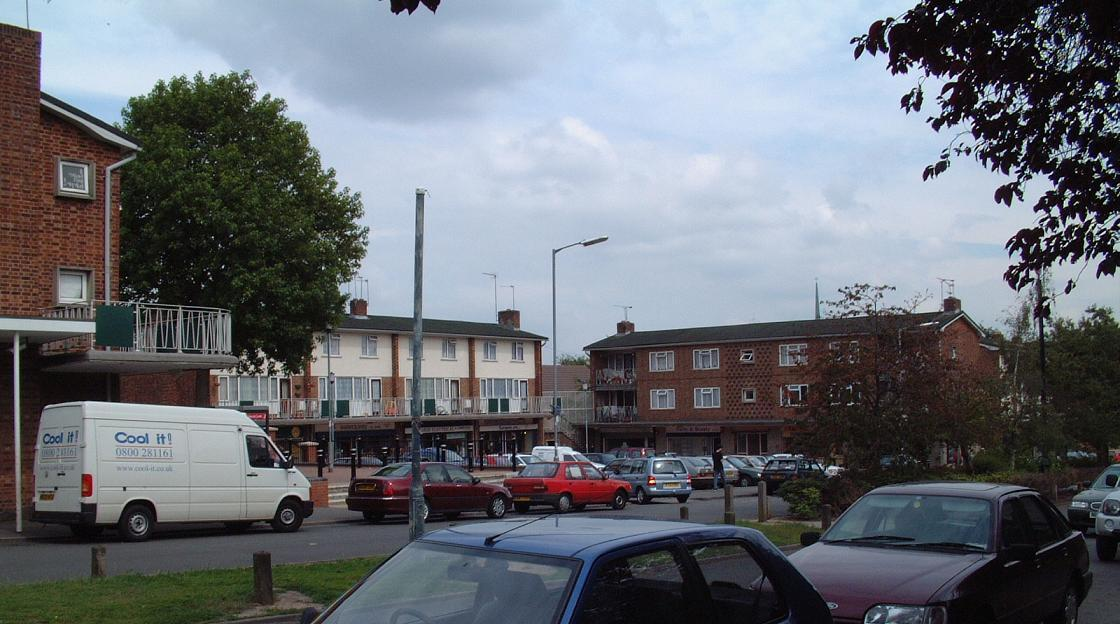
- Crown Way, Lillington

- Location within Warwickshire
- OS grid reference: SP329670
- Civil parish: Royal Leamington Spa
- District: Warwick
- Shire county: Warwickshire
- Region: West Midlands
- Country: England
- Sovereign state: United Kingdom
- Post town: Leamington Spa
- Postcode district: CV32
- Police: Warwickshire
- Fire: Warwickshire
- Ambulance: West Midlands

Lillington is a suburb of Leamington Spa, in the civil parish of Royal Leamington Spa, in the Warwick District in the county of Warwickshire, England. Historically a village which existed before the time of the Domesday Book (1086), it was incorporated into the borough of Leamington in 1890. Lillington is a ward of Warwick District Council and Royal Leamington Spa Town Council.

== Geography ==
Lillington itself has two main areas – the new centre based around Crown Way which contains shops, dry cleaners and a post office. The area was predominantly built as a council house estate from 1950 onwards, and contains three tower blocks. The tallest of these, the fifteen-storey Eden Court, standing at the highest point of the estate, dominates the skyline and can be seen from south Leamington Spa, Radford Semele and for miles outside Leamington. The second, and older area, contains the former village with the parish church of St. Mary Magdalene, the manor house, and some Victorian terraced houses as well as estates of predominantly semi-detached houses built since 1930.

=== Campion Hills ===
The Campion Hills are the highest area of Leamington, rising to an altitude of 97m (318 ft) above OD. Situated to the north of, and above Newbold Comyn park, they offer a view over the whole town. Sited here is Leamington's transmission tower which relays TV signals from Sutton Coldfield and broadcasts local commercial radio station, Hits Radio Coventry & Warwickshire. Its Severn Trent water treatment plant serves the whole Leamington area. Warwick District Council runs a BMX track on the hills.

=== Bins Brook ===
The Bins Brook is a mainly culverted watercourse that runs south into Leamington. Just inside Lillington, on the Leamington town centre side adjacent to the Midland Oak, is a fenced area of meadow plants in a man-made depression. This excavated area is normally dry, but fills from the Bins Brook if it overflows during flash floods, to reduce the risk of local flooding to property.

=== The Midland Oak ===
The Midland Oak by the junction of Lillington Avenue and Lillington Road marks the supposed very centre of England. The original oak is thought to have dated from the 16th century. Having died, it was removed in 1967, which allowed the Lillington Road to be straightened. Its successor was planted in the 1980s, from an acorn collected from the original.

=== Prehistoric and early remains ===
In the 1930s prehistoric elephant and woolly rhinoceros remains were found in sand and gravel pits in Cubbington Road, near the site of the present Lillington Free Church. Some of these are displayed in Warwick Market Hall Museum. Stone Age remains have also been found there. Roman artefacts and burials have been discovered in the area of Highland Road and Braemar Road.

=== Lillington Stud Farm ===
Lillington was once well known as a centre for horse-breeding at the stud farm owned by Sydney McGregor (1889–1970). McGregor's best known horse was probably April the Fifth, which won the Epsom Derby in 1932. The farm buildings and house stood at the end of Epsom Road. After 1970, the area was developed for housing, with many of the new roads having racing-related names.

== Education ==
The local schools are Lillington Nursery and Primary School, Telford Infant and Telford Junior Schools. The nearest secondary school is North Leamington School. A Sure Start Children’s Centre opened in late 2006, adjacent to the 1950s-built community centre, and Lillington Library on Mason Avenue.

== Churches ==
The Church of England parish church of St. Mary Magdalene in Vicarage Road retains some Saxon work, but was largely rebuilt between 1847 and 1884. The late Perpendicular tower also remains, with a contemporary bell cast around 1480. With two seventeenth-century bells and five more dating from 1927, the present ring of eight bells was formed. They were re-hung by Nicholsons' of Bridport in 2007.

The Roman Catholic Church of Our Lady, in Valley Road next to the Public Library, was consecrated in 1963. It has notable stained glass in the 'Dalle de verre' style, designed by Dom Charles Norris of Buckfast Abbey, and made at Prinknash Abbey.

Lillington Free Church is on the north side of Cubbington Road, close to The Holt.

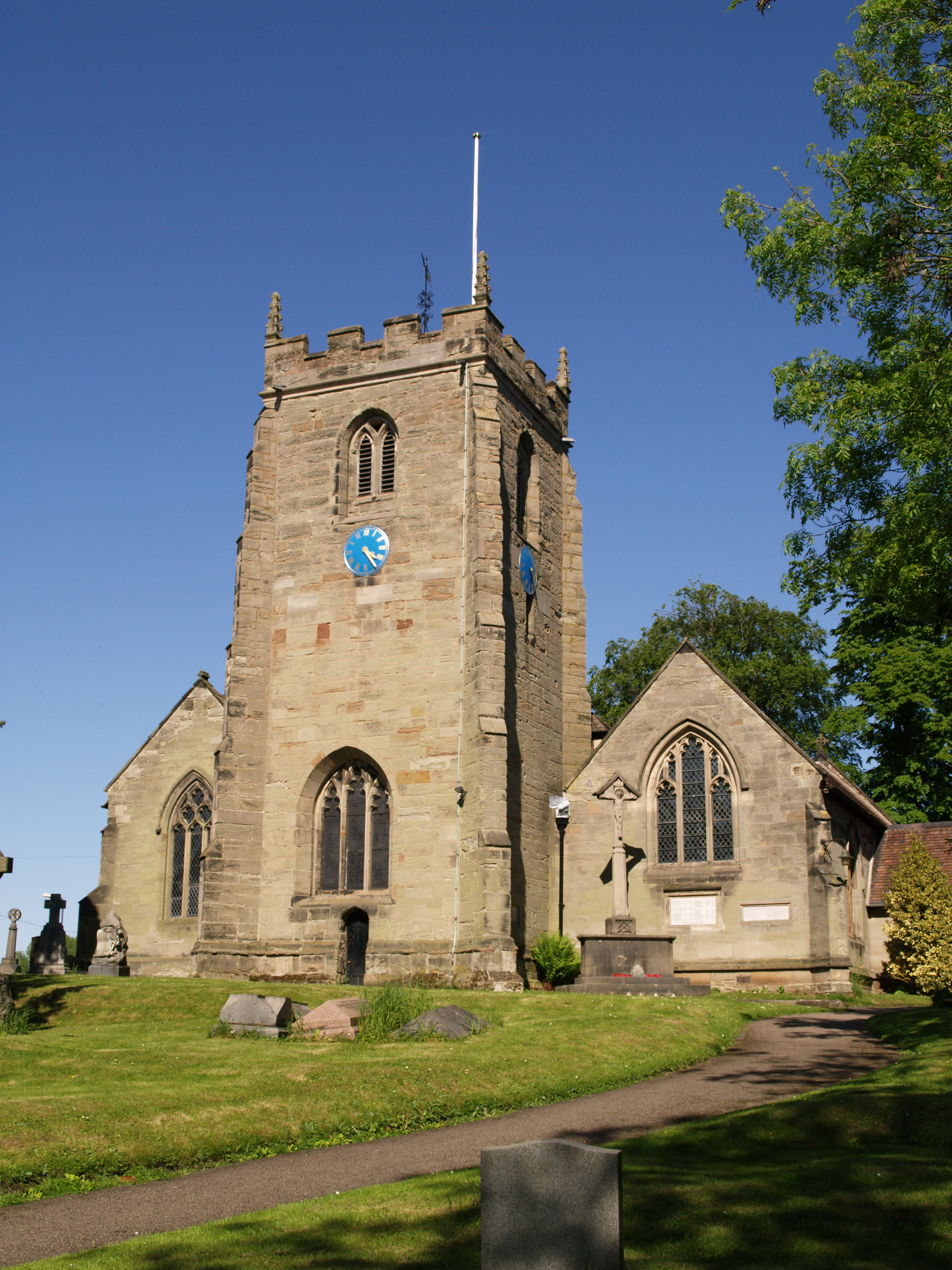
Lillington Parish Church

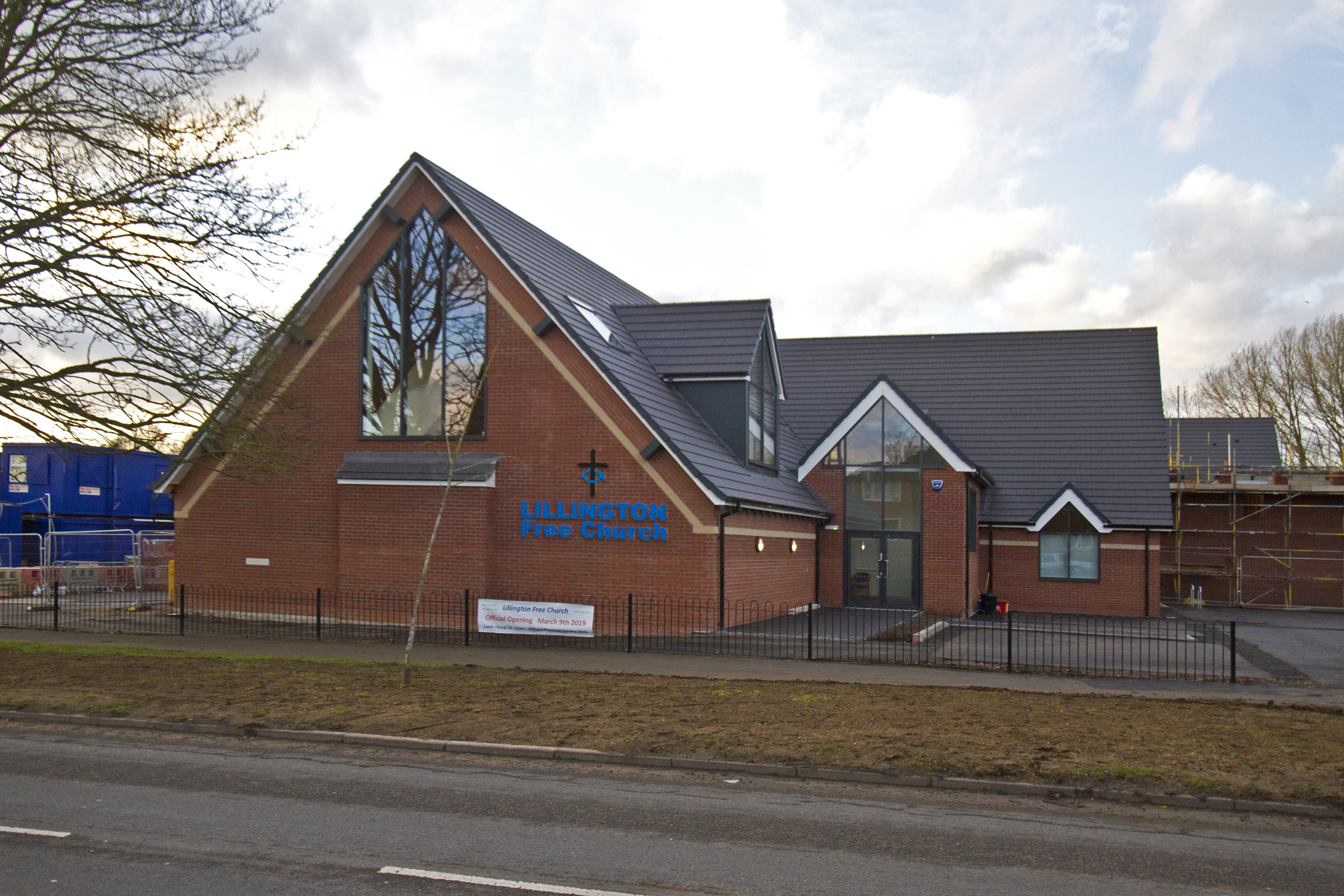
Lillington Free Church

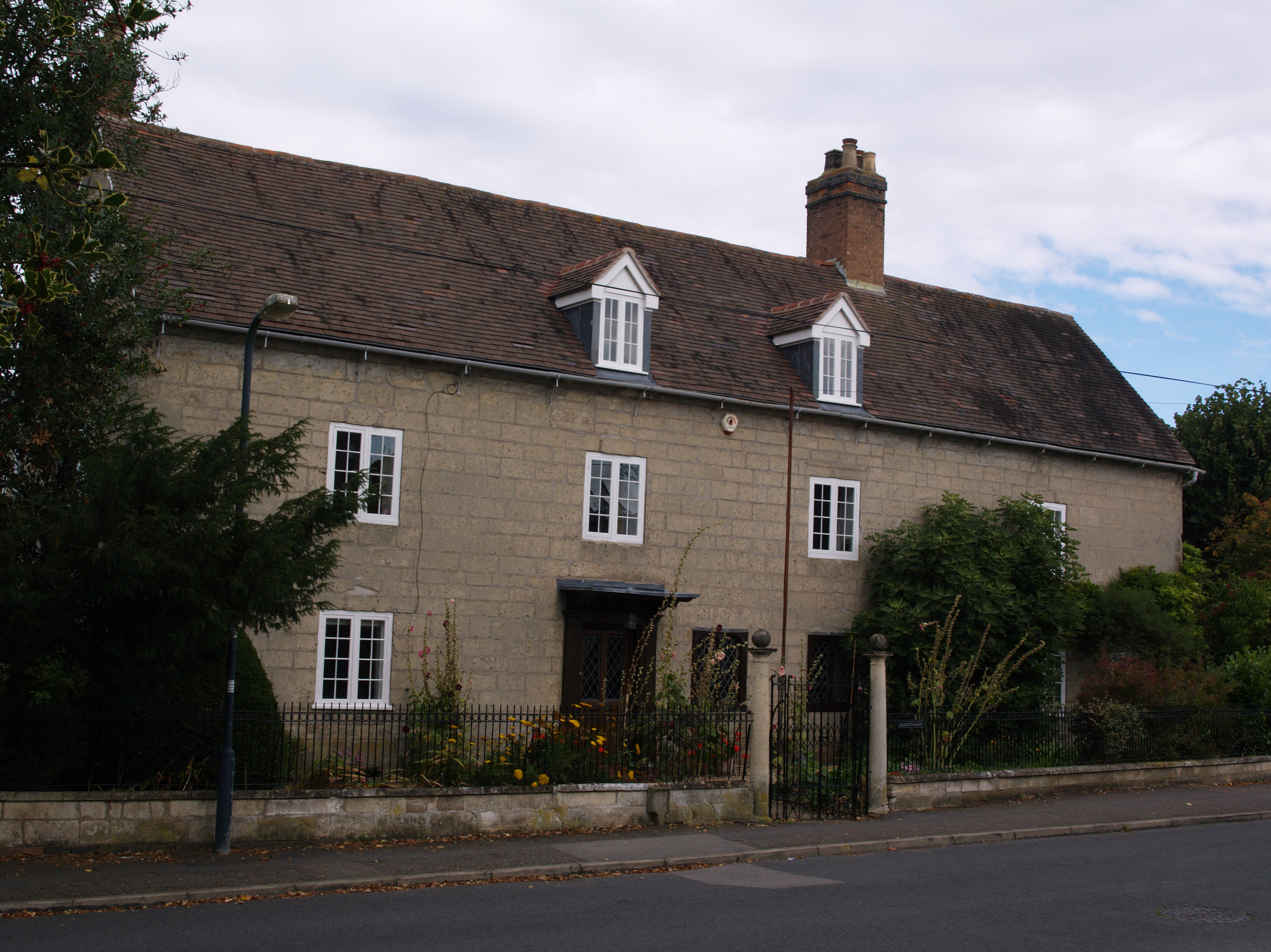
Lillington Manor House, Church Lane

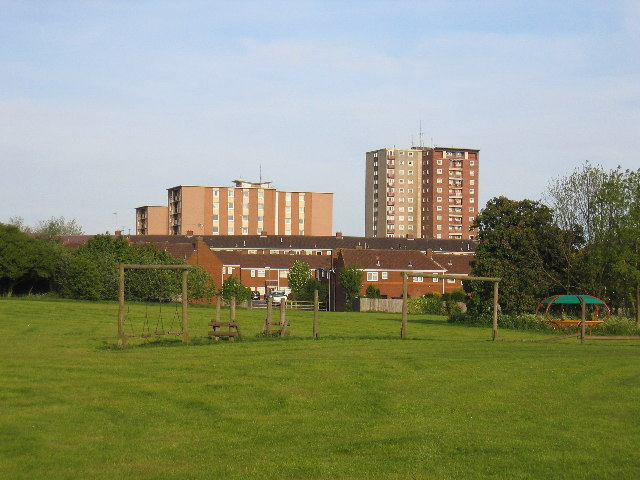
Eden Court, Lillington, from Mason Avenue Park

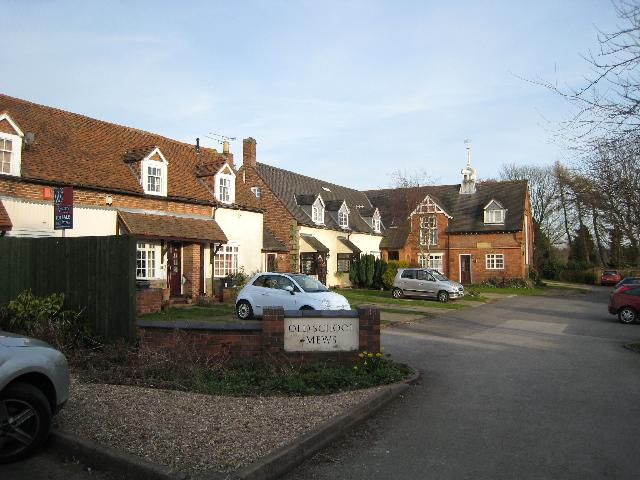
Former School and Parish Room, Cubbington Road

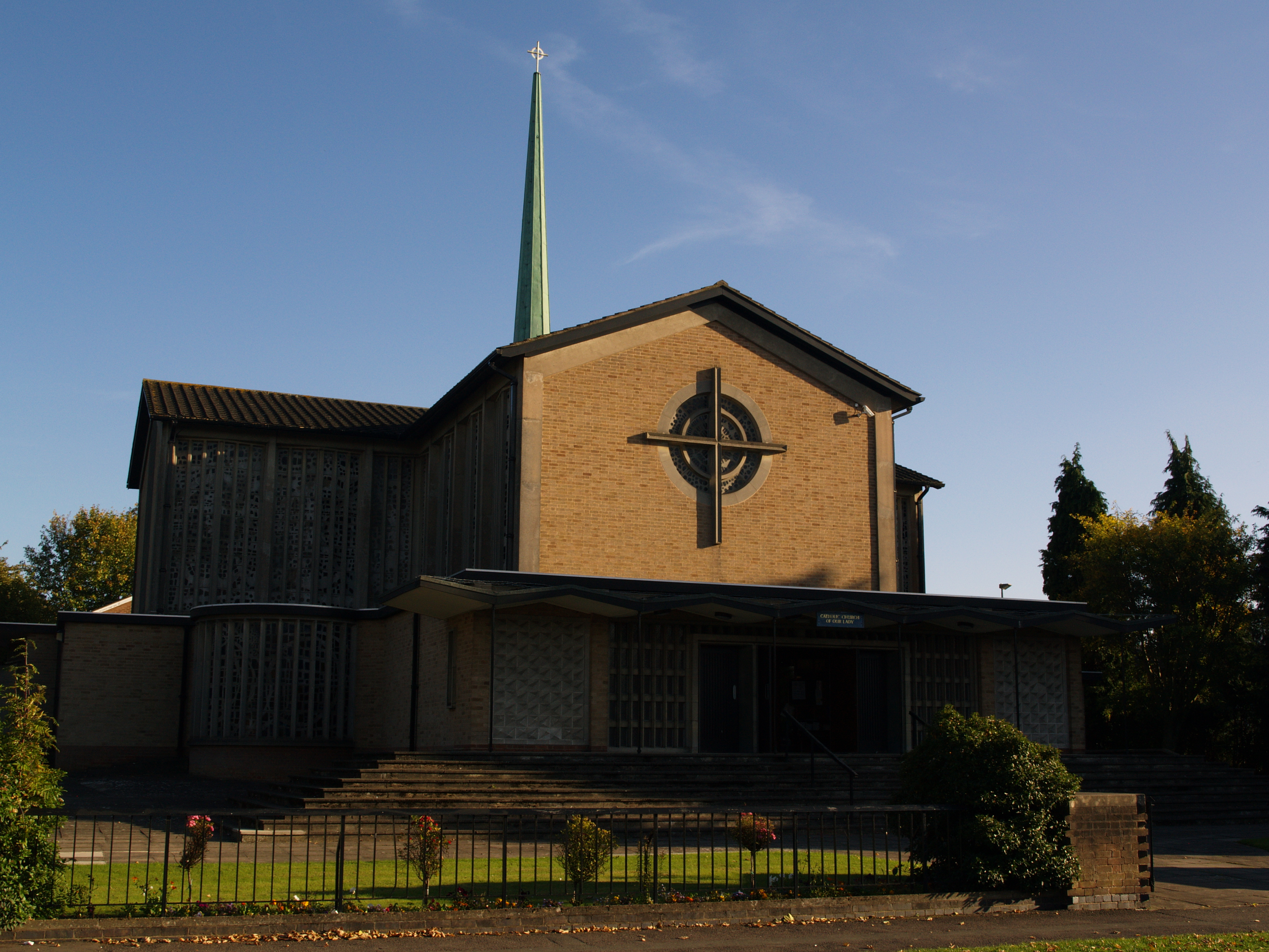
Lillington RC Church, Valley Road

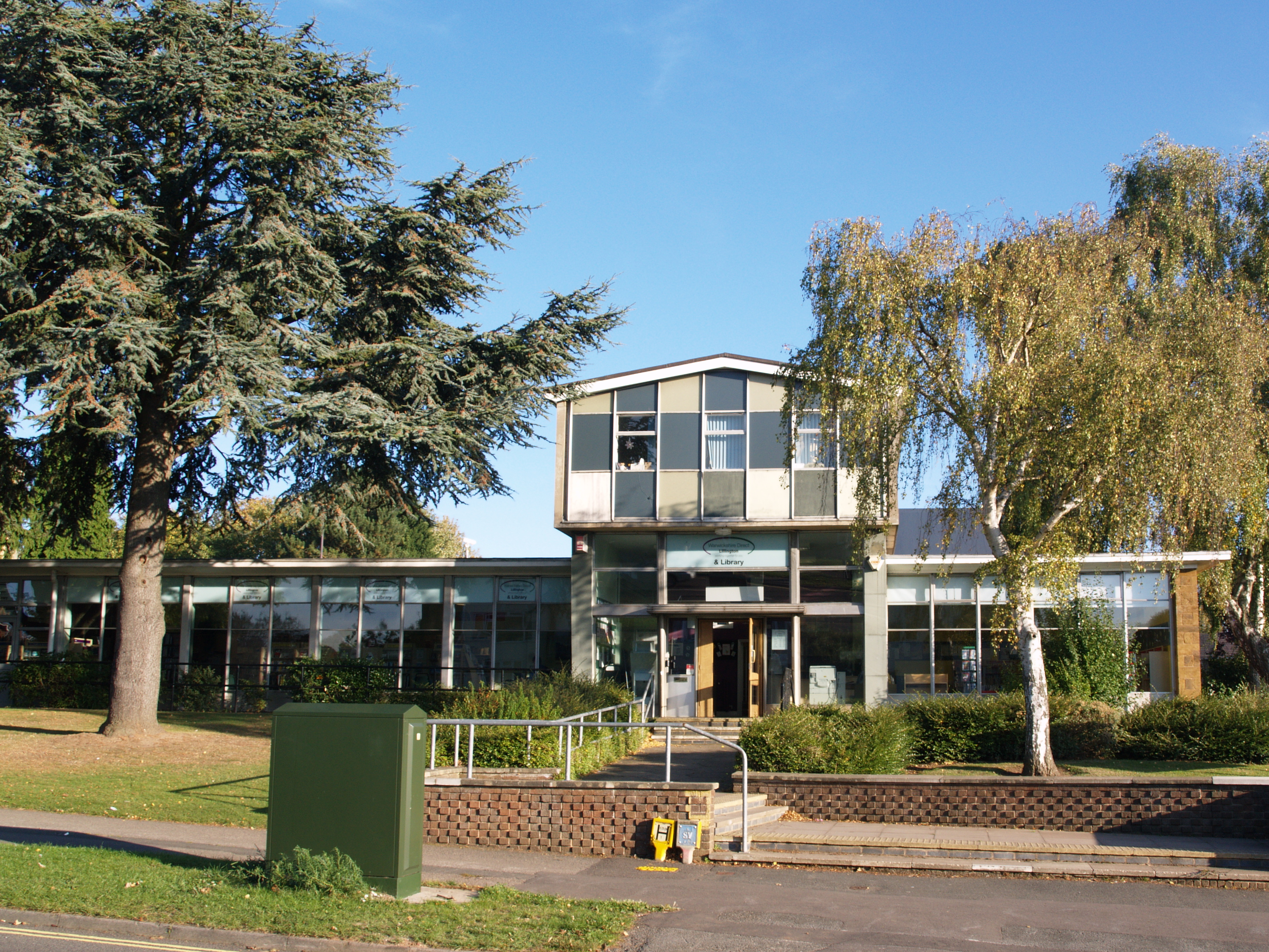
Lillington County Library, Valley Road

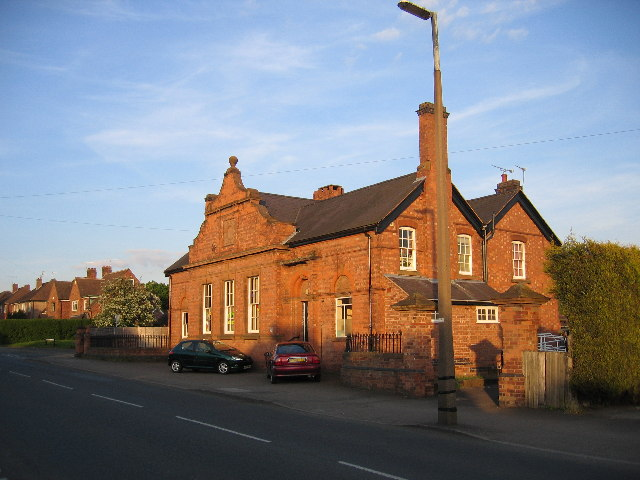
Former Board of Health meeting room, corner of Cubbington Road and Pound Lane

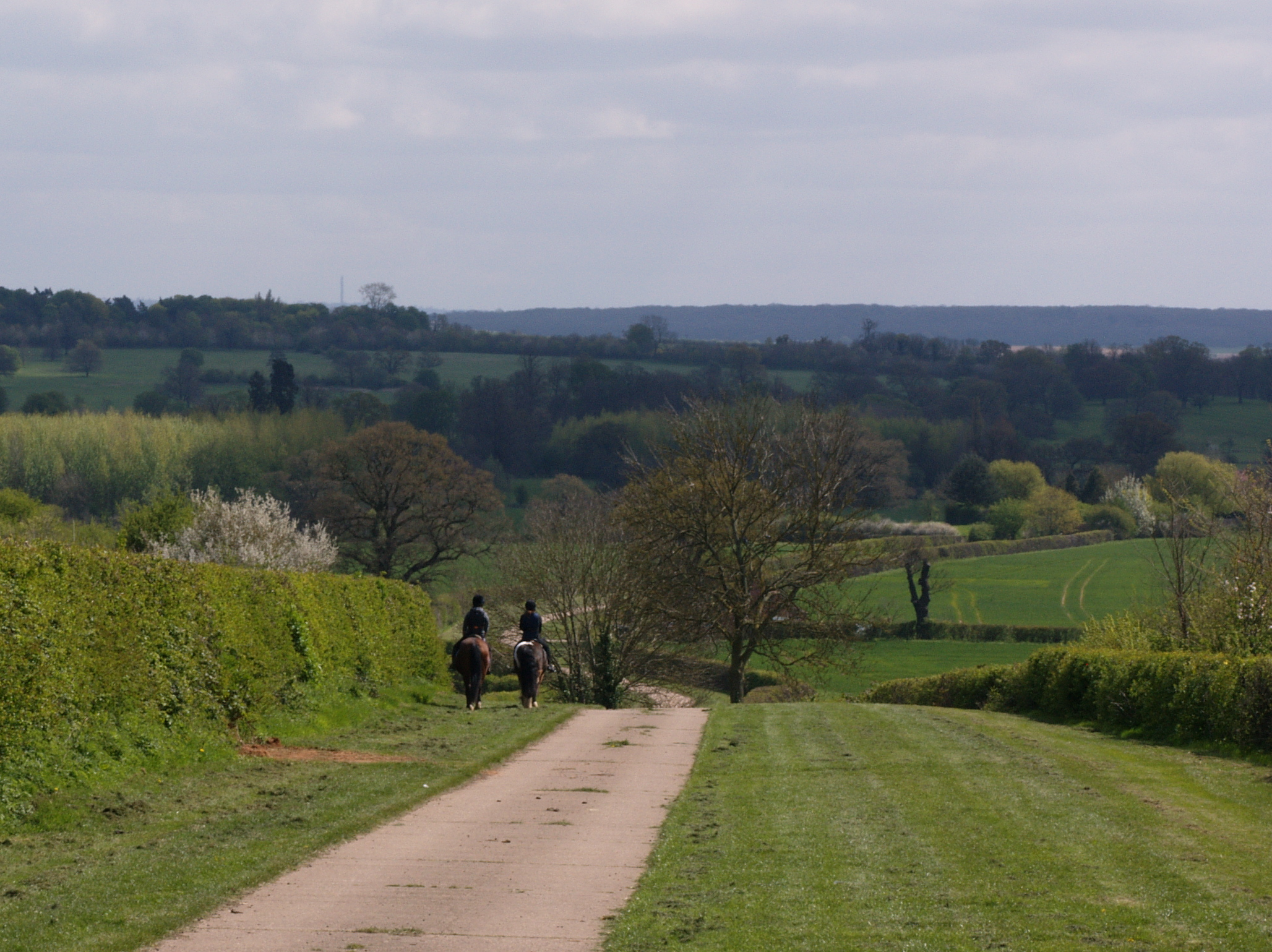
Lane to Red House Farm.

== Civil parish ==
In 1901 the parish had a population of 1,241. The parish was abolished on 1 April 1902 to form "Leamington".

== Nearby places ==
Lillington adjoins Cubbington to the north.
