= Lillington Library =

Public library in Leamington Spa, England

Coordinates: 52.3017°N 1.5177°W

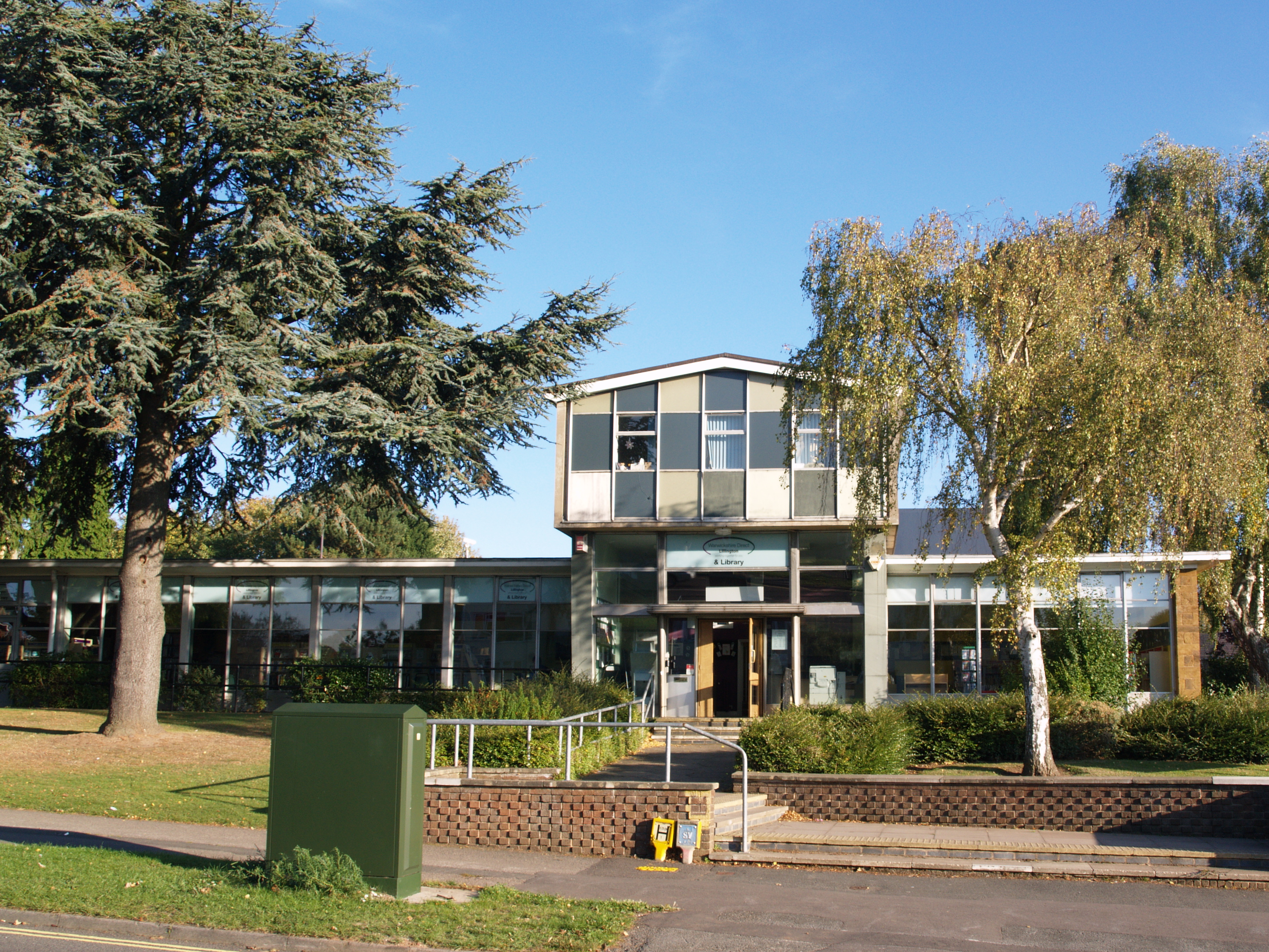
Lillington Library

Lillington Library is a public library in Leamington Spa, England.

It was designed by Henry Fedeski in a Festival of Britain style. It was built 1959–60 and was Grade II listed in 2015 after Warwick District Council intended to demolish it along with other community buildings in Lillington as part of a regeneration plan. It was built by George Wimpey.
