= Henry Fedeski =

British architect

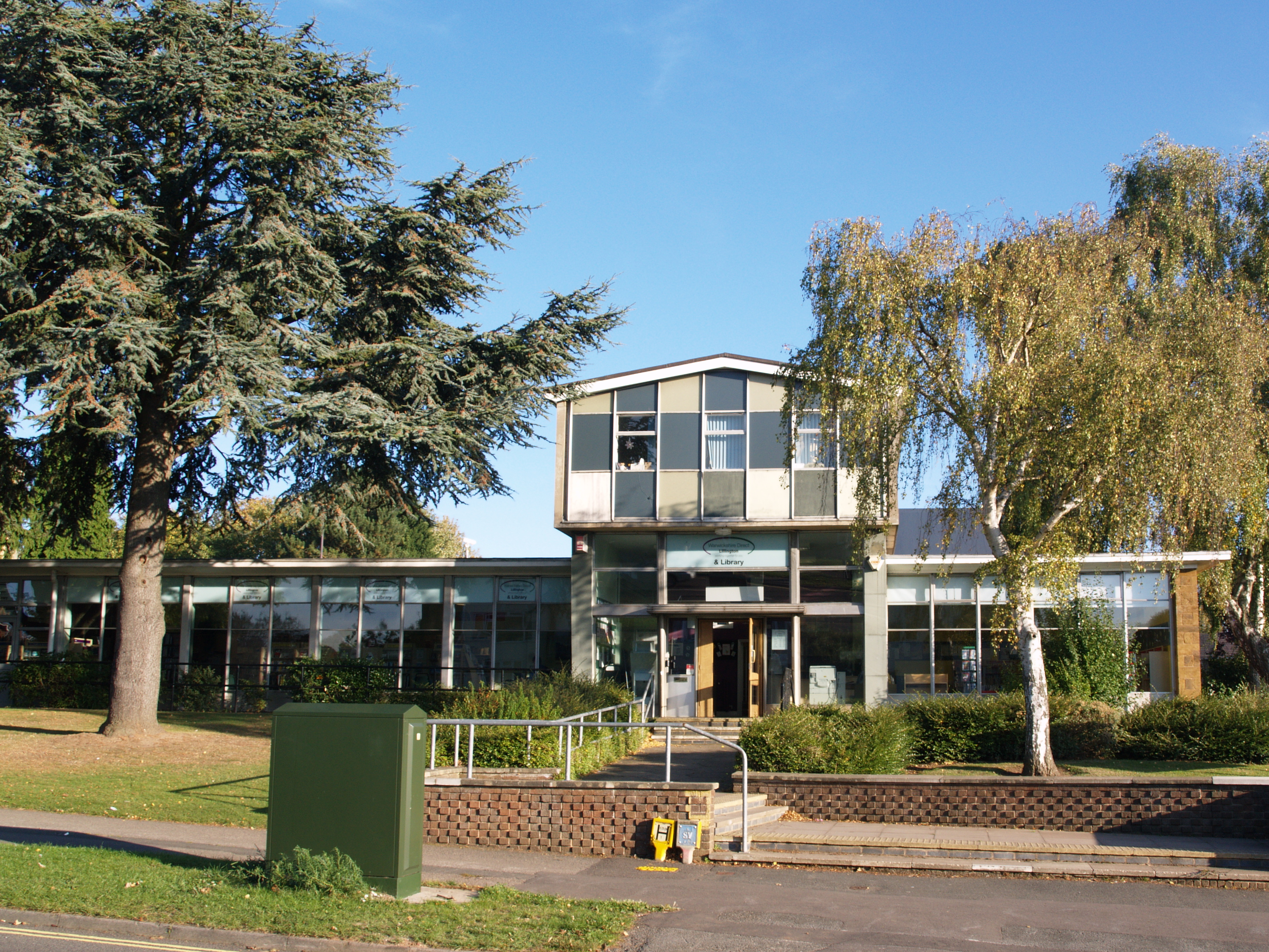
Lillington Library

Henry Fedeski ARIBA (1907–1993) was a British architect, responsible for several buildings in the Leamington Spa area, including Lillington County Library, and the Roman Catholic Church of Our Lady, Valley Road, Lillington, both Grade II listed. He co-founded Rayner and Fedeski Architects.

Fedeski designed Lillington Library, Leamington Spa, in a Festival of Britain style. It was built 1959–60, and was Grade II listed in 2015.
