= Committee room =

Election campaign planning room

As well as simply referring to any room in which a committee meets, 'Committee Room' is a term used in connection with UK elections to describe the place or places where a political party organizes its campaign. It most usually refers to a room, often in a private house, which is actually used on the day of the election itself, rather than the run up to the election. Typical activities will involve collating lists of supporters and attempting to track whether or not they have actually voted in the election as well as organizing transport to the Polling station.

If a committee room is rented (as opposed to the more normal position of being in a supporter's own home) then the costs are an election expense. It was formerly illegal to hold committee rooms in pubs and other licensed premises, but this restriction was removed by the Representation of the People Act 1985.
