= Tillyard =

Tillyard may be

- Aelfrida Tillyard, author and religious figure
- E. M. W. Tillyard, classical and literary scholar
- H. J. W. Tillyard, classicist, Byzantinist and musicologist
- Robert John Tillyard (1881–1937), entomologist
- Stella Tillyard, author

== See also ==
- Tillyard's skipper (Anisynta tillyardi), a butterfly species
- Tillard
- Tiltyard
