= Allegory =

Literary device

As a literary device or artistic form, an allegory is any narrative or visual work of art intended as symbolism for moral or political ideas. Typically, the depicted events and characters serve as the symbols for such ideas. Creators have used allegory throughout history in all forms of art to illustrate or convey complex ideas and concepts in ways that are comprehensible or striking to its viewers, readers, or listeners.

Writers and speakers typically use allegories to convey (semi-) hidden or complex meanings through symbolic figures, actions, imagery, or events, which together create the moral, spiritual, or political meaning the author wishes to convey. Many allegories use personification of abstract concepts.

== Etymology ==
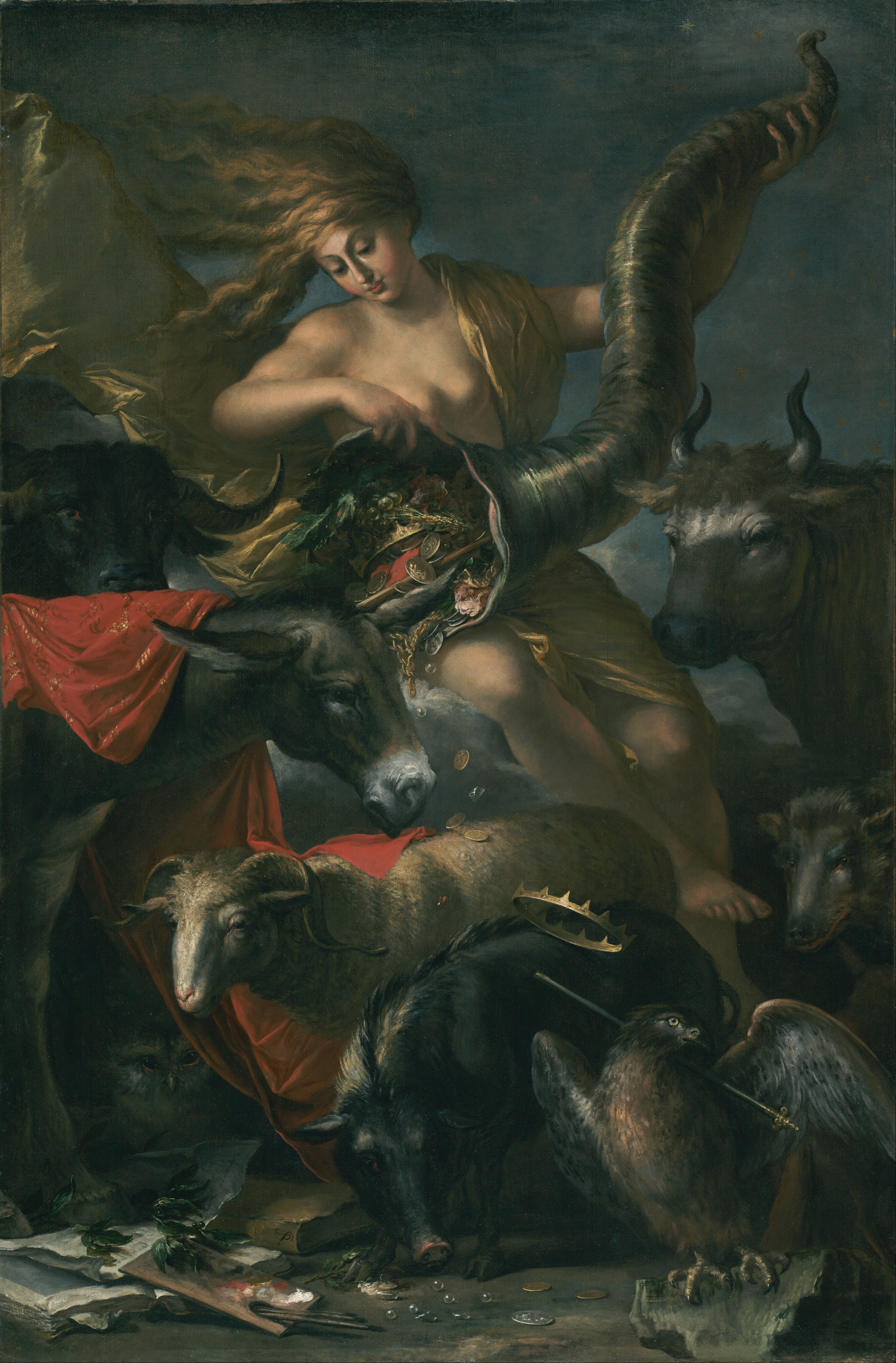
Salvator Rosa: Allegory of Fortune, representing Fortuna, the goddess of luck, with the horn of plenty

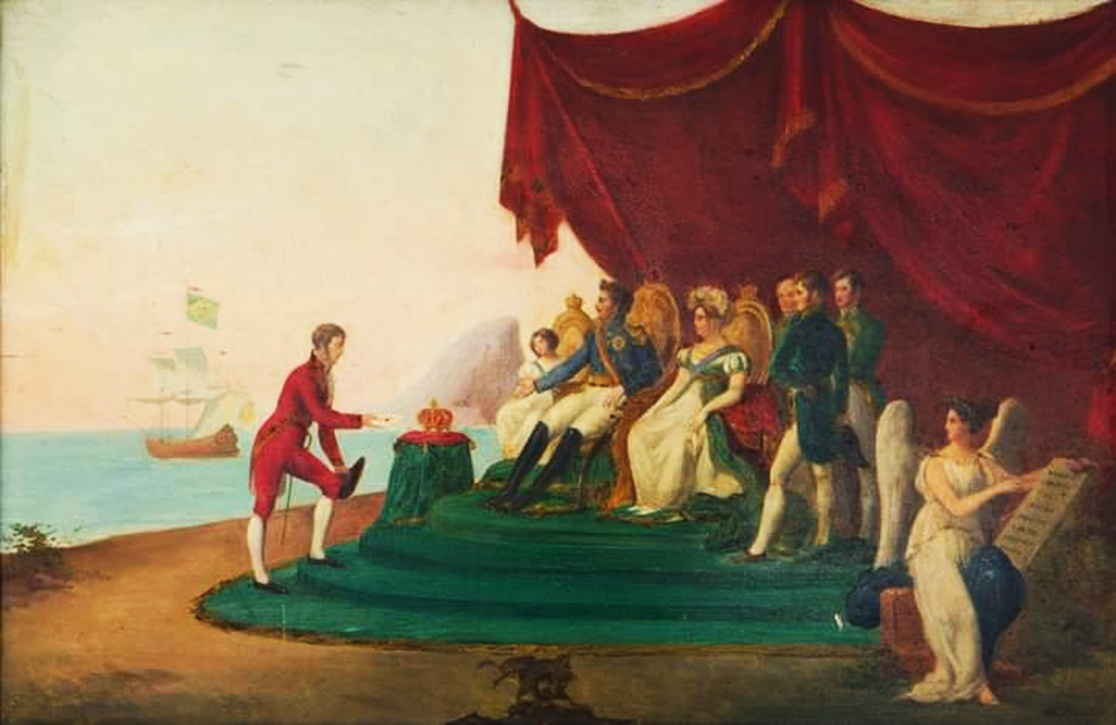
Allegory of the recognition of the Empire of Brazil and its independence. The painting depicts British diplomat Sir Charles Stuart presenting his letter of credence to Emperor Pedro I of Brazil, who is flanked by his wife Maria Leopoldina, their daughter Maria da Glória (later Queen of Portugal as Maria II), and other dignitaries. At right, a winged figure, representing History, carving the "great event" on a stone tablet.

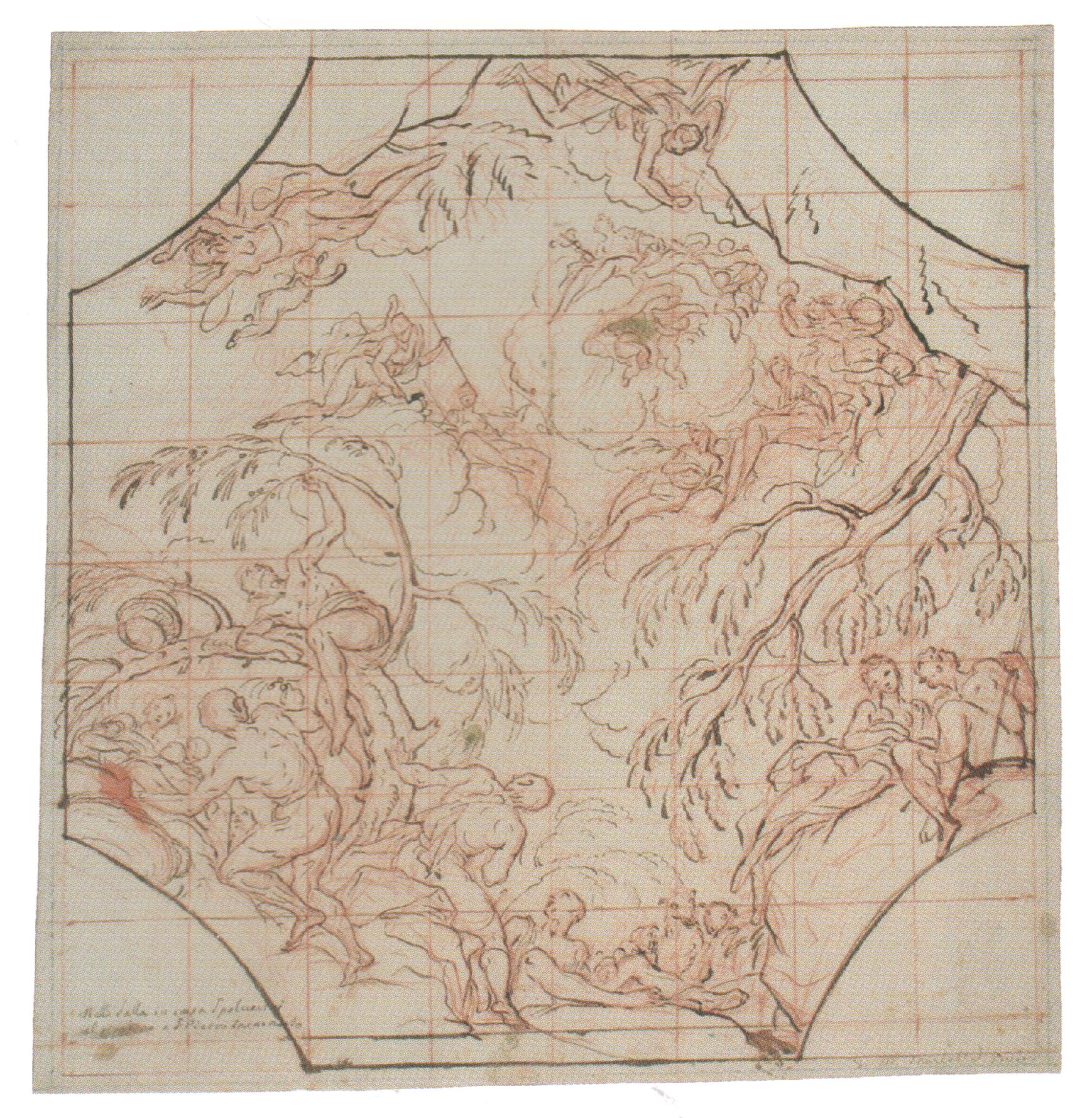
Marco Marcola: Mythological allegory

First attested in English in 1382, the word allegory comes from Latin allegoria, the latinisation of the Greek ἀλληγορία (allegoría), "veiled language, figurative", literally "speaking about something else", which in turn comes from ἄλλος (allos), "another, different" and ἀγορεύω (agoreuo), "to harangue, to speak in the assembly", which originates from ἀγορά (agora), "assembly".

== Types ==
Northrop Frye discussed what he termed a "continuum of allegory", a spectrum that ranges from what he termed the "naive allegory" of the likes of The Faerie Queene, to the more private allegories of modern paradox literature. In this perspective, the characters in a "naive" allegory are not fully three-dimensional, for each aspect of their individual personalities and of the events that befall them embodies some moral quality or other abstraction; the author has selected the allegory first, and the details merely flesh it out.

=== Classical allegory ===
The origins of allegory can be traced at least back to Homer in his "quasi-allegorical" use of personifications of, e.g., Terror (Deimos) and Fear (Phobos) at Il. 115 f. The title of "first allegorist", however, is usually awarded to whoever was the earliest to put forth allegorical interpretations of Homer. This approach leads to two possible answers: Theagenes of Rhegium (whom Porphyry calls the "first allegorist," Porph. Quaest. Hom. 1.240.14–241.12 Schrad.) or Pherecydes of Syros, both of whom are presumed to be active in the 6th century B.C.E., though Pherecydes is earlier and is often presumed to be the first writer of prose. The debate is complex, since it demands that we observe the distinction between two often conflated uses of the Greek verb "allēgoreīn," which can mean both "to speak allegorically" and "to interpret allegorically."

In the case of "interpreting allegorically," Theagenes appears to be our earliest example. Presumably in response to proto-philosophical moral critiques of Homer (e.g., Xenophanes fr. 11 Diels-Kranz), Theagenes proposed symbolic interpretations whereby the Gods of the Iliad actually stood for physical elements. So, Hephestus represents Fire, for instance (for which see fr. A2 in Diels-Kranz). Some scholars, however, argue that Pherecydes cosmogonic writings anticipated Theagenes allegorical work, illustrated especially by his early placement of Time (Chronos) in his genealogy of the gods, which is thought to be a reinterpretation of the titan Kronos, from more traditional genealogies.

In classical literature two of the best-known allegories are the Cave in Plato's The Republic (Book VII) and the story of the stomach and its members in the speech of Menenius Agrippa (Livy ii. 32).

Among the best-known examples of allegory, Plato's Allegory of the Cave, forms a part of his larger work The Republic. In this allegory, Plato describes a group of people who have lived chained in a cave all of their lives, facing a blank wall (514a–b). The people watch shadows projected on the wall by things passing in front of a fire behind them and begin to ascribe forms to these shadows, using language to identify their world (514c–515a). According to the allegory, the shadows are as close as the prisoners get to viewing reality, until one of them finds his way into the outside world where he sees the actual objects that produced the shadows. He tries to tell the people in the cave of his discovery, but they do not believe him and vehemently resist his efforts to free them so they can see for themselves (516e–518a). This allegory is, on a basic level, about a philosopher who, upon finding greater knowledge outside the cave of human understanding, seeks to share it as is his duty, and the foolishness of those who would ignore him because they think themselves educated enough.

In Late Antiquity Martianus Capella organized all the information a fifth-century upper-class male needed to know into an allegory of the wedding of Mercury and Philologia, with the seven liberal arts the young man needed to know as guests. Also, the Neoplatonic philosophy developed a type of allegorical reading of Homer and Plato. As scholars of allegory point out, "the literal reading of a text has its counter-part in allegorical interpretation. This way of reading, which must have started with the first readers of Homer and found a fertile ground in Philo's allegorical commentaries on the Bible, was amazingly natural for Proclus, whose writings and commentaries represent the last phases of late antique philosophy, and particularly of the relation between philosophy and rhetoric."

=== Biblical allegory ===
Other early allegories are found in the Hebrew Bible, such as the extended metaphor in Psalm 80 of the vine and its impressive spread and growth, representing Israel's conquest and population of the Promised Land. Ezekiel 16 and 17 are also allegorical, with the capture of that same vine by the mighty eagle representing Israel's exile to Babylon. Jesus' parable of the king's wedding feast (Matthew 22) has been described as "obviously an allegory".

Allegorical interpretation of the Bible was a common early Christian practice and continues. For example, the recently re-discovered Fourth Commentary on the Gospels by Fortunatianus of Aquileia has a comment by its English translator: "The principal characteristic of Fortunatianus' exegesis is a figurative approach, relying on a set of concepts associated with key terms in order to create an allegorical decoding of the text."

=== Medieval allegory ===
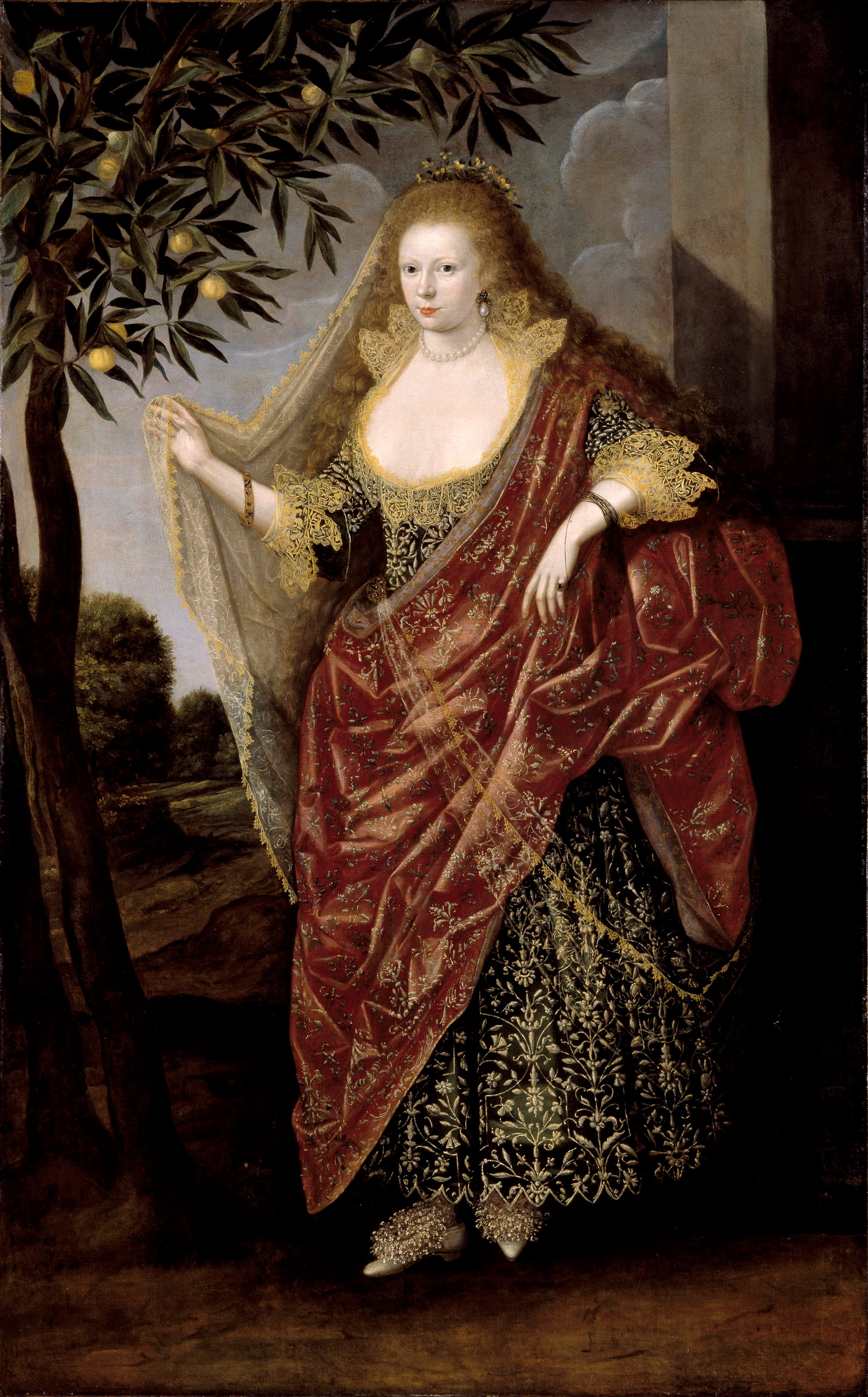
British School 17th century – Portrait of a Lady, Called Elizabeth, Lady Tanfield. Sometimes the meaning of an allegory can be lost, even if art historians suspect that the artwork is an allegory of some kind.

Allegory has an ability to freeze the temporality of a story, while infusing it with a spiritual context. Medieval thinking accepted allegory as having a reality underlying any rhetorical or fictional uses. The allegory was as true as the facts of surface appearances. Thus, the Papal Bull Unam Sanctam (1302) presents themes of the unity of Christendom with the pope as its head in which the allegorical details of the metaphors are adduced as facts on which is based a demonstration with the vocabulary of logic: "Therefore of this one and only Church there is one body and one head—not two heads as if it were a monster... If, then, the Greeks or others say that they were not committed to the care of Peter and his successors, they necessarily confess that they are not of the sheep of Christ." This text also demonstrates the frequent use of allegory in religious texts during the Medieval Period, following the tradition and example of the Bible.

Pearl is one of the greatest allegorical poems from the High Middle Ages, written in Middle English.

In the late 15th century, the enigmatic Hypnerotomachia, with its elaborate woodcut illustrations, shows the influence of themed pageants and masques on contemporary allegorical representation, as humanist dialectic conveyed them.

The denial of medieval allegory as found in the 12th-century works of Hugh of St Victor and Edward Topsell's Historie of Foure-footed Beastes (London, 1607, 1653) and its replacement in the study of nature with methods of categorisation and mathematics by such figures as naturalist John Ray and the astronomer Galileo is thought to mark the beginnings of early modern science.

=== Modern allegory ===
Since meaningful stories are nearly always applicable to larger issues, allegories may be read into many stories which the author may not have recognized. This is allegoresis, or the act of reading a story as an allegory. Examples of allegory in popular culture that may or may not have been intended include the works of Bertolt Brecht, and even some works of science fiction and fantasy, such as The Chronicles of Narnia by C. S. Lewis.

== Poetry and fiction ==
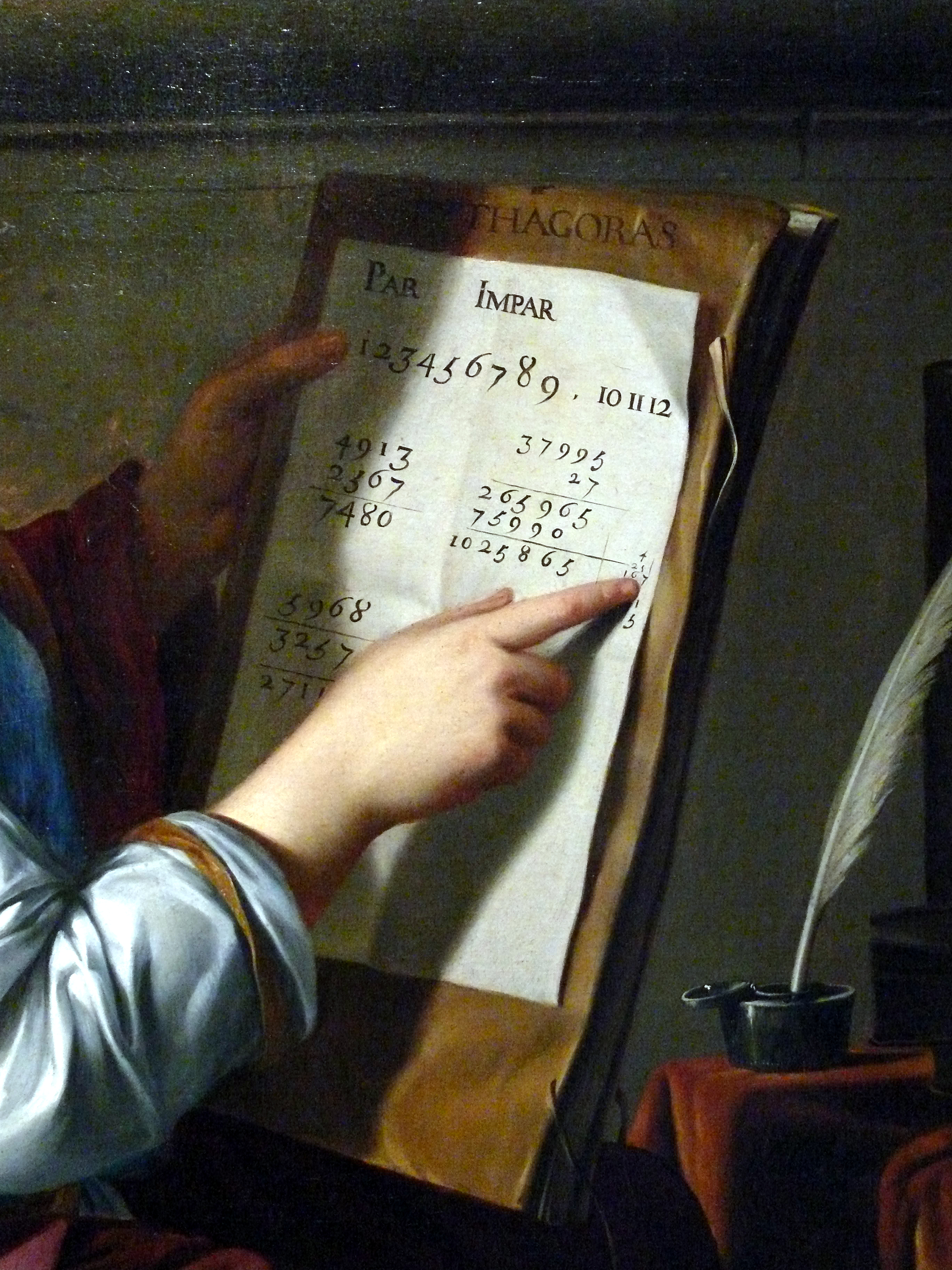
Detail of Laurent de La Hyre's Allegory of Arithmetic, c. 1650

While allegoresis may enable the discovery of allegory in a work, not every resonant work of modern fiction is allegorical, and some are clearly not intended to be viewed this way. According to Henry Littlefield's 1964 article, L. Frank Baum's The Wonderful Wizard of Oz, may be readily understood as a plot-driven fantasy narrative in an extended fable with talking animals and broadly sketched characters, intended to discuss the politics of the time. Yet, George MacDonald emphasized in 1893 that "A fairy tale is not an allegory."

J. R. R. Tolkien's The Lord of the Rings is another example of a well-known work mistakenly perceived as allegorical, as the author himself once stated, "...I cordially dislike allegory in all its manifestations, and always have done so since I grew old and wary enough to detect its presence. I much prefer history – true or feigned – with its varied applicability to the thought and experience of readers. I think that many confuse applicability with allegory, but one resides in the freedom of the reader, and the other in the purposed domination of the author."

Tolkien specifically resented the suggestion that the book's One Ring, which gives overwhelming power to those possessing it, was intended as an allegory of nuclear weapons. He noted that, had that been his intention, the book would not have ended with the Ring being destroyed but rather with an arms race in which various powers would try to obtain such a Ring for themselves. Then Tolkien went on to outline an alternative plot for "Lord of The Rings", as it would have been written had such an allegory been intended, and which would have made the book into a dystopia. While all this does not mean Tolkien's works may not be treated as having allegorical themes, especially when reinterpreted through postmodern sensibilities, it at least suggests that none were conscious in his writings. This further reinforces the idea of forced allegoresis, as allegory is often a matter of interpretation and only sometimes of original artistic intention.

Like allegorical stories, allegorical poetry has two meanings – a literal meaning and a symbolic meaning.

Some unique specimens of allegory can be found in the following works:

- Edmund Spenser – The Faerie Queene: The several knights in the poem actually stand for several virtues.
- William Shakespeare – The Tempest: an allegory of the civilisation/barbarism binary as it pertains to colonialism
- John Bunyan – The Pilgrim's Progress: The journey of the protagonists Christian and Evangelist symbolises the ascension of the soul from earth to Heaven.
- Nathaniel Hawthorne – Young Goodman Brown: The Devil's Staff symbolises defiance of God. The characters' names, such as Goodman and Faith, ironically serve as paradox in the conclusion of the story.
- Nathaniel Hawthorne – The Scarlet Letter: The letter represents self-reliance from America's Puritan and conformity.
- Esteban Echeverría – The Slaughter Yard: The slaughter yard represents the violence and brutality of the Federalist regime of Juan Manuel de Rosas in Buenos Aires and his parapolice thugs, the Mazorca.
- George Orwell – Animal Farm: The pigs stand for political figures of the Russian Revolution.
- Julio Cortázar – Casa Tomada: The take over of the protagonists' house is said to represent Peronism taking over Argentina.
- László Krasznahorkai – The Melancholy of Resistance and the film Werckmeister Harmonies: It uses a circus to describe an occupying dysfunctional government.
- Edgar Allan Poe – The Masque of the Red Death: The story can be read as an allegory for humans' inability to escape death.
- Arthur Miller – The Crucible: The Salem witch trials are thought to be an allegory for McCarthyism and the blacklisting of Communists in the United States of America.
- Shel Silverstein – The Giving Tree: The book has been described as an allegory about relationships; between parents and children, between romantic partners, or between humans and the environment.
- Nonoy Marcelo – Ikabod Bubwit: The rodents represent the political figures and working class in the Philippines, with the title character served as an allegory of Ferdinand Marcos.

=== Art ===
Some elaborate and successful specimens of allegory are to be found in the following works, arranged in approximate chronological order:

- Ambrogio Lorenzetti – Allegoria del Buono e Cattivo Governo e loro Effetti in Città e Campagna (c. 1338–1339)
- Sandro Botticelli – Primavera (c. 1482)
- Albrecht Dürer – Melencolia I (1514)
- Bronzino – Venus, Cupid, Folly and Time (c. 1545)
- The English School's – "Allegory of Queen Elizabeth" (c. 1610)
- Artemisia Gentileschi – Allegory of Inclination (c. 1620), An Allegory of Peace and the Arts under the English Crown (1638); Self-Portrait as the Allegory of Painting (c. 1638–39)
- The Feast of Herod with the Beheading of St John the Baptist by Bartholomeus Strobel is also an allegory of Europe in the time of the Thirty Years' War, with portraits of many leading political and military figures.
- Jan Vermeer – Allegory of Painting (c. 1666)
- Fernand Le Quesne – Allégorie de la publicité
- Jean-Léon Gérôme – Truth Coming Out of Her Well (1896)
- Graydon Parrish – The Cycle of Terror and Tragedy (2006)
- Many statues of Lady Justice: "Such visual representations have raised the question why so many allegories in the history of art, pertaining occupations once reserved for men only, are of female sex."
- Damien Hirst Verity (2012)

In contrast to the 19th century, in which only a few painters such as Gustave Courbet were interested in allegories, the political and social problems of the 20th century were increasingly treated as allegorical subjects. As early as 1922, The Red Christ by Lovis Corinth expresses the world’s post-war trauma, many other notable paintings like Departure (Beckmann) or Guernica (Picasso) commemorate the victims of totalitarianism and war in this way. In the 21st century, the allegorical approach resurges as a relevant concept in the visual arts. Various artists explicitly refer to their works as allegories. For example, Kent Monkman critically engages with the conventional personification of painting in The Allegory of Painting, while Dieter Hörhammer gives the title Mental Allegories to his cycle of paintings that address psychological phenomena. Works such as these, however, are based on an expanded conceptual scope. Whereas traditional allegories were simply understood as clearly solvable pictorial riddles, modern allegories are characterized precisely by their invitation to diverse interpretations. Unlike symbolic form, which strives for a unity of object and meaning, the allegorical image emphasizes that it represents only a segment and a reference to a complex web of meaning. While the chaotic global age resists symbolic representation, it suits the artificial and fragmentary style of allegory, which is why allegory is relevant for discussions of modern and postmodern art.

== Gallery ==
Allegorical Paintings of the 16th and 17th century

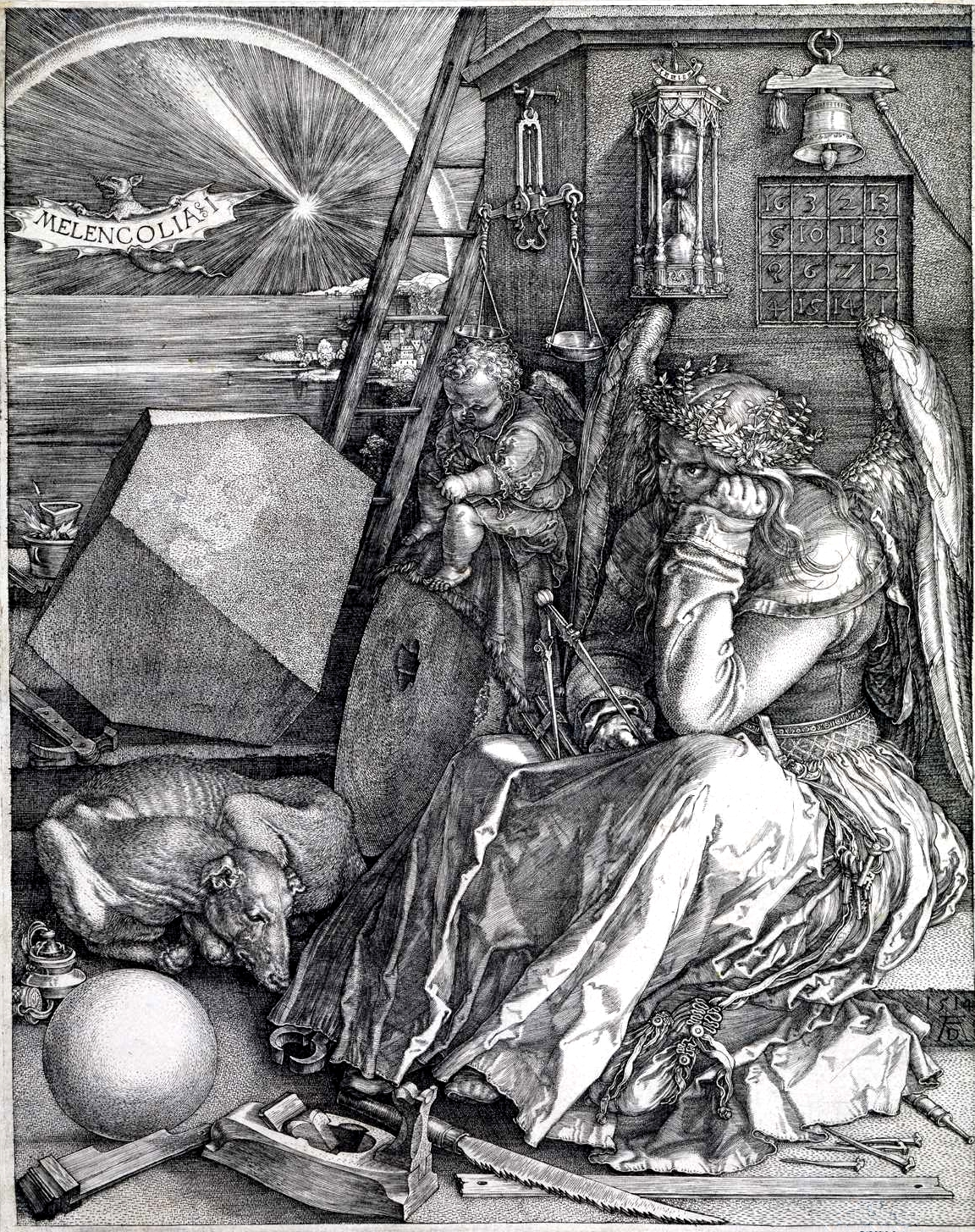
Albrecht Dürer, Melencolia I (1514): Unused tools, an hourglass, an empty scale surrounds a female personification, with other esoteric and exoteric symbols.

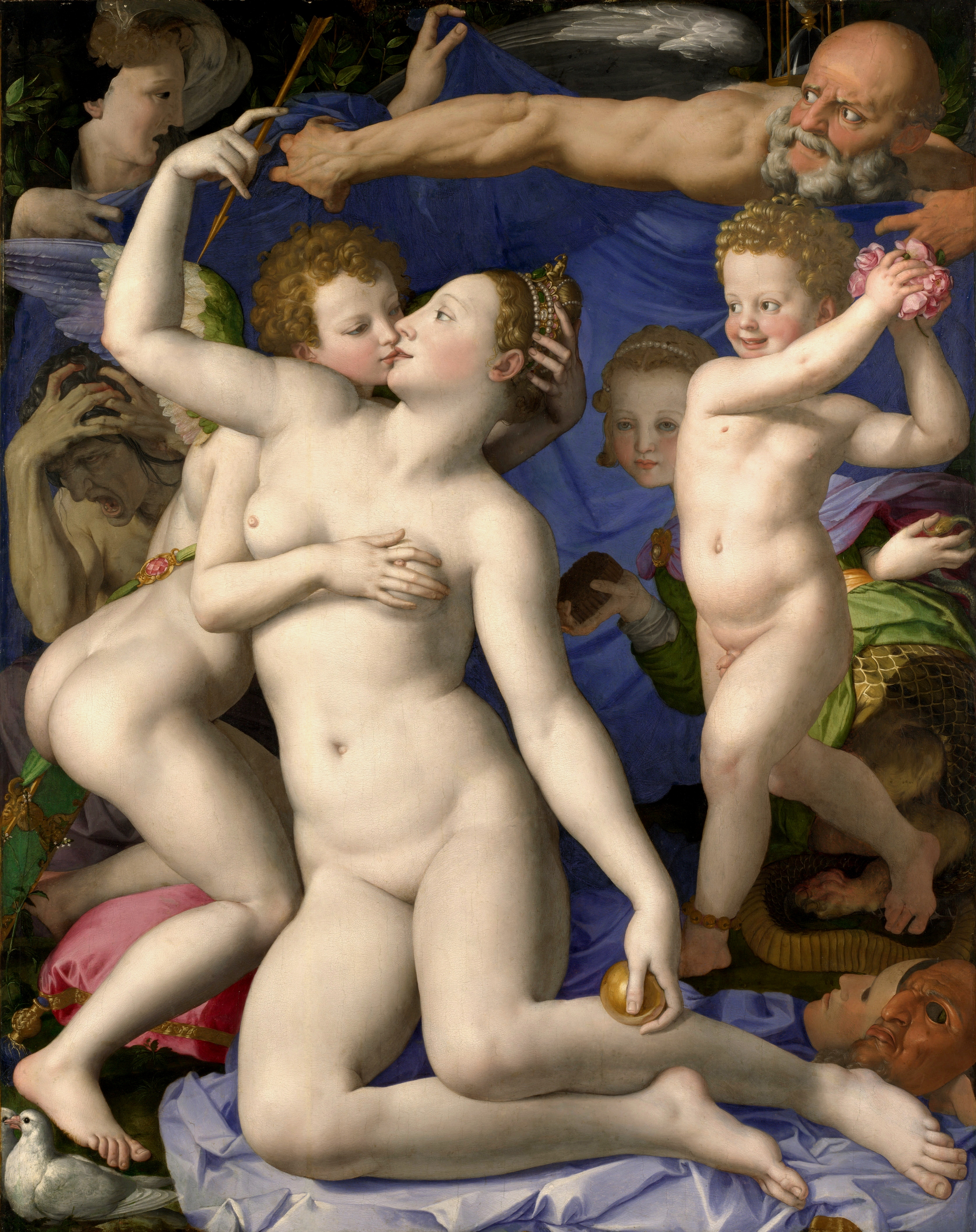
Bronzino, Venus, Cupid, Folly and Time (c. 1545): The deities of love are surrounded by personifications of (probably) Time (a bald, man with angry eyes), Folly (the young woman-demon on the right, possibly also so old woman on the left), and others.

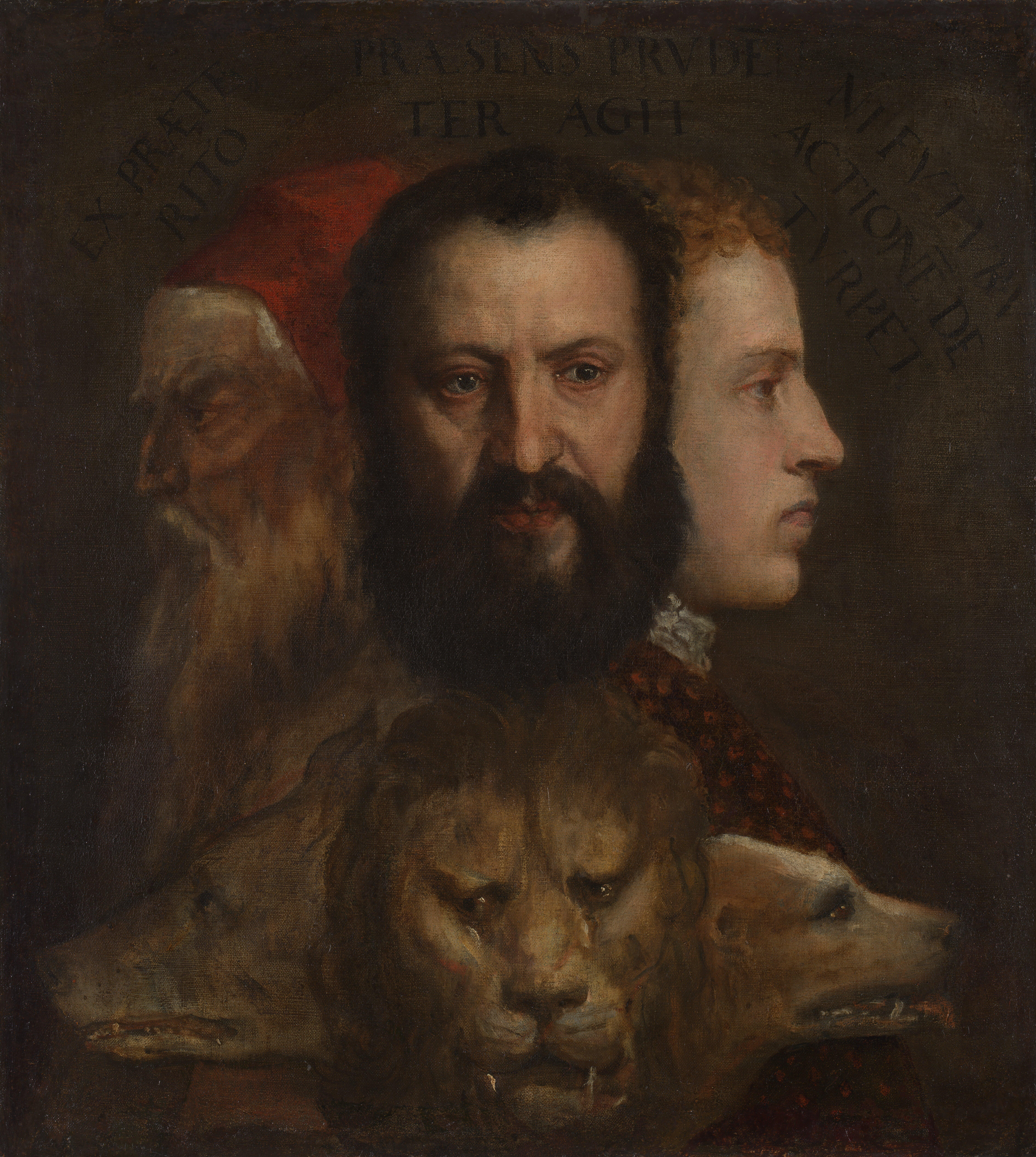
Titian, Allegory of Prudence (c. 1565–1570): The three human heads symbolise past, present and future, the characterisation of which is furthered by the triple-headed beast (wolf, lion, dog), girded by the body of a big snake.

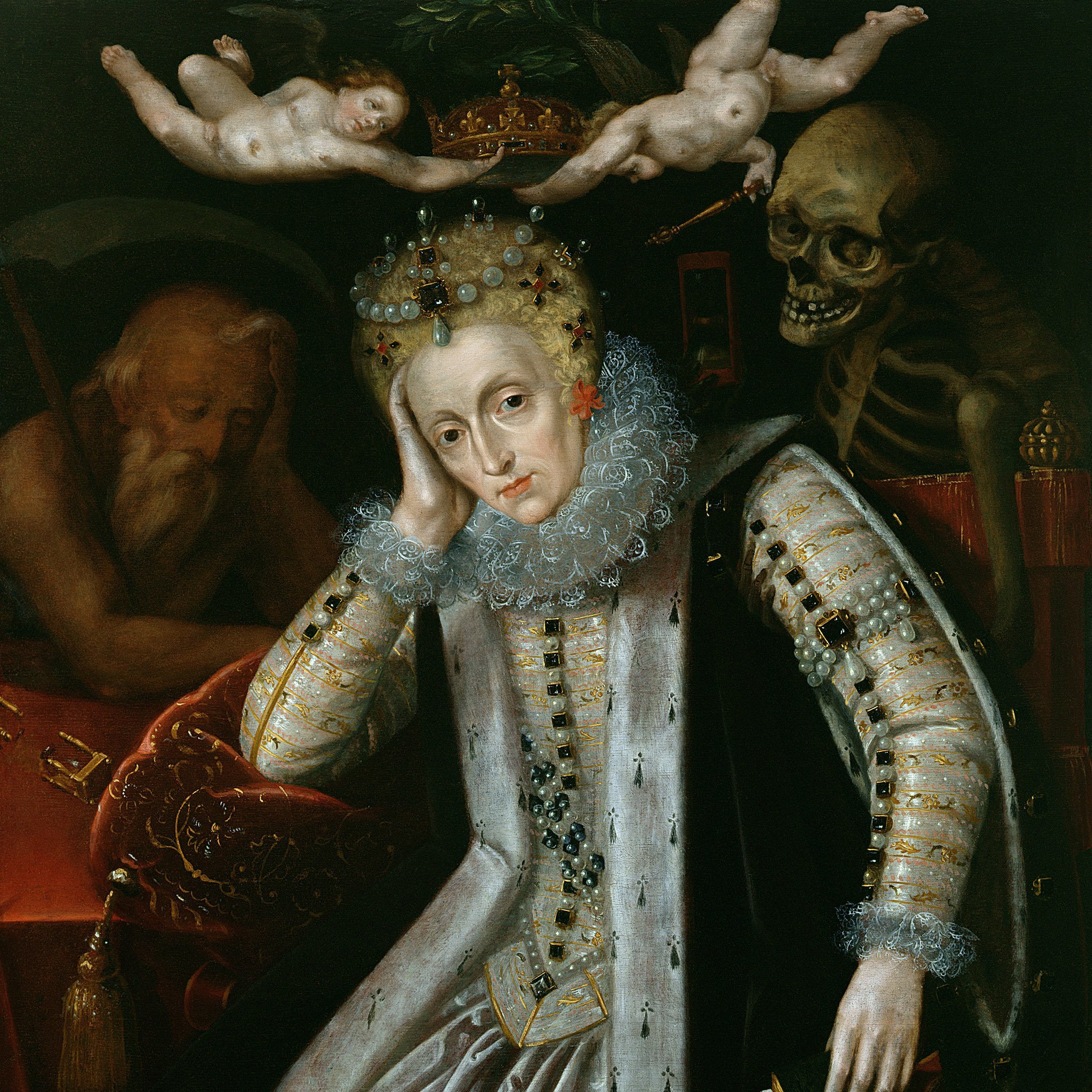
The English School's Allegory of Queen Elizabeth (c. 1610), with Father Time at her right and Death looking over her left shoulder. Two cherubs are removing the weighty crown from her tired head.

Artemisia Gentileschi, Self-Portrait as the Allegory of Painting (c. 1638–39)

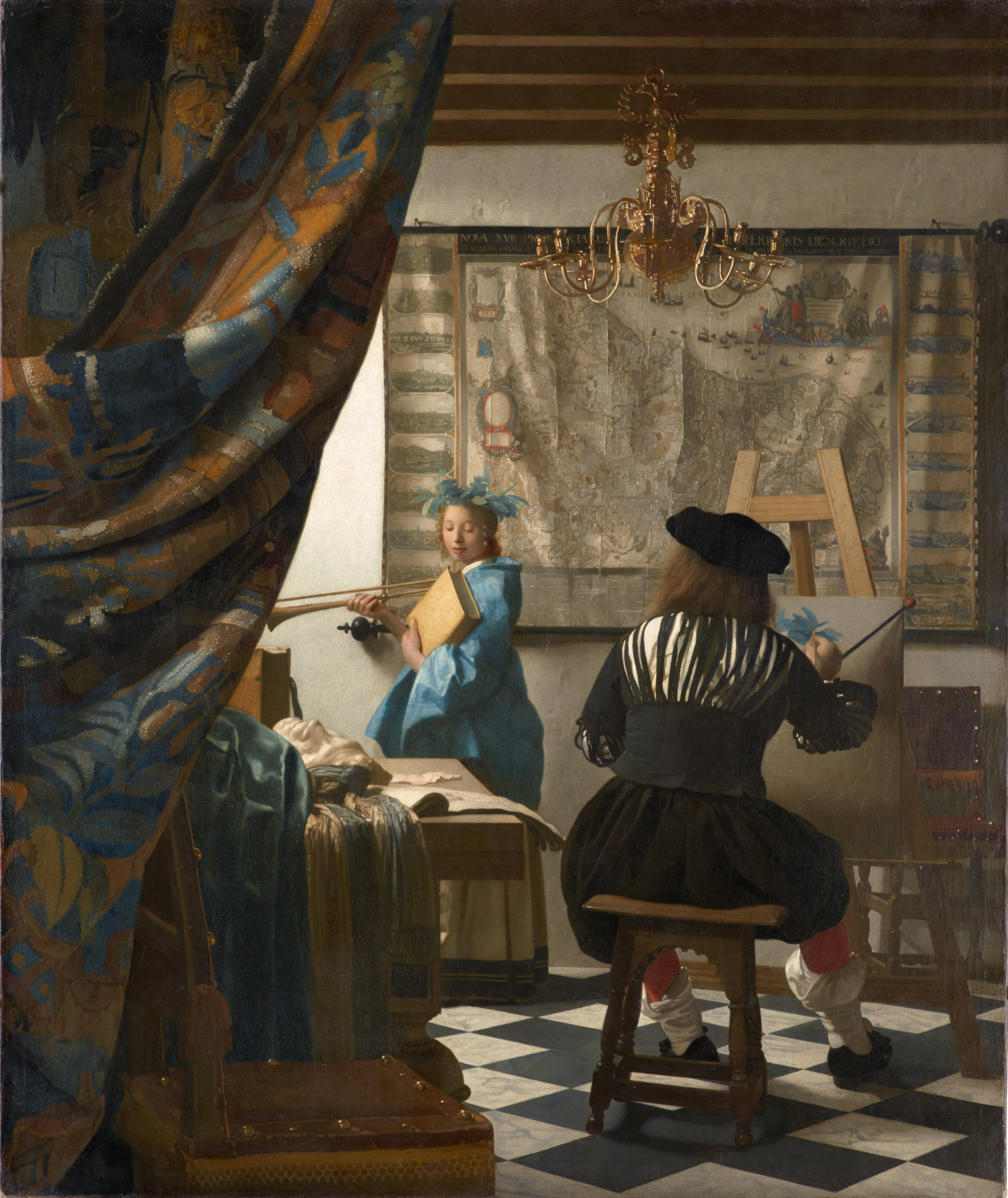
Jan Vermeer, The Art of Painting (c. 1666): Painting is shown as related to history and politics, the young woman being Clio, the muse of history, and other symbols for the political and religious division of the Netherlands appearing.

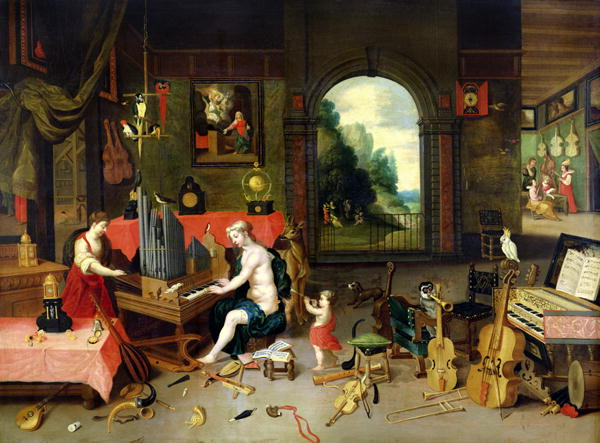
Jan van Kessel, Allegory of Hearing (17th century): Diverse sources of sound, especially instruments serve as allegorical symbols.

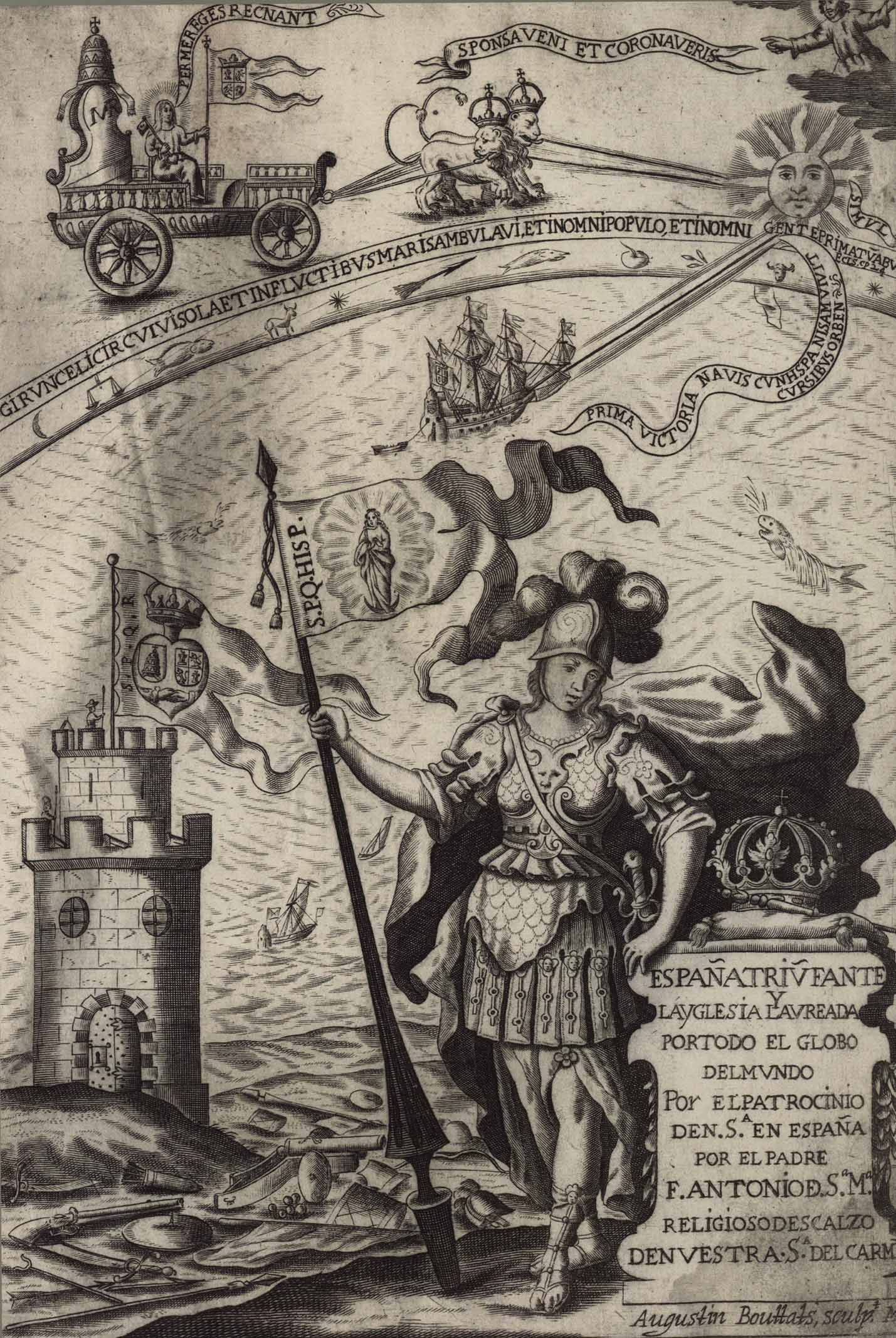
Flemish August Bouttats, Allegory of Triumphant Spain with immaculist banner, c. 1682, cover of Triumphant Spain and the laureate church all over the world by the patronage of Holy Mary. Collection: Hispanic Society of America.

== See also ==
- Allegories
  - Allegorical interpretations of Plato
  - Allegorical interpretation of the Bible
  - Allegory in Renaissance literature
  - Allegorical sculpture – Personification of abstract ideas
- Cultural depictions of Philip II of Spain
- Diwan (poetry) – Collection of poems in Islamic cultures
- Extended metaphor – Use of a single metaphor or analogy at length
- Freemasonry – Group of fraternal organizations ("a system of morality veiled in allegory and illustrated by symbols")
- Parable – Short didactic story which illustrates one or more instructive lessons or principles
- Semiotics – Study of signs
- Theagenes of Rhegium – Ancient Greek literary critic
