= Joel D. Heck =

- Born: 1 October 1948; Seward, Nebraska
- Education: Th.D. in Exegetical Theology from Concordia Seminary, Th.M. from Trinity Evangelical Divinity School, M.Div. from Concordia Theological Seminary, B.A. from Concordia Senior College, A.A. from Concordia University Wisconsin
- Occupations: Professor, author
- Known for: scholarship about C. S. Lewis
- Spouse: Cheryl
- Children: 3
- Website: Concordia.edu

Joel D. Heck (born 1 October 1948) is a retired pastor and professor, formerly Executive Editor of Concordia University Press. He is the author or editor of sixteen books, most recently publishing No Ordinary People: Twenty-One Friendships of C. S. Lewis. He currently serves as Interim President of Concordia Lutheran Seminary in Edmonton, Alberta, Canada.

== Biography ==
=== Early life ===
Joel D. Heck was born in Seward, Nebraska, and raised in a pastor's family in Nebraska, South Dakota, Iowa, and Wisconsin. His father, Donald E. Heck (1916–1991), was a pastor of the Lutheran Church–Missouri Synod (LCMS) who served congregations in Michigan, Nebraska, South Dakota, Iowa, and Wisconsin. The elder Heck and his wife Lucille (1915–2004) raised five children, with Joel the oldest son and third child overall (siblings Barbara, Doris, Christine, and Thomas). Donald Heck was especially known for his translations of C. F. W. Walther's sermons from the German, published by Concordia Publishing House in two volumes, and for his bulletin insert service.

=== Career and family ===
Heck holds the A.A. from Concordia University Wisconsin, the B.A. from Concordia Senior College, the M.Div. from Concordia Theological Seminary in Fort Wayne, Indiana, the Th.M. from Trinity Evangelical Divinity School in Deerfield, Illinois (where he studied under Gleason Archer and Walter Kaiser), and the Th.D. in Exegetical Theology from Concordia Seminary, St. Louis (Horace Hummel, advisor). He spent his seminary vicarage year serving under Rev. Walter Martin at Trinity Lutheran Church in Bogota, New Jersey.

He served as pastor of Zion Lutheran Church, Valley Park, Missouri, from 1975 to 1984, chairing the LCMS's Missouri District Board of Evangelism for much of that time. He then served as a theology professor at Concordia University Wisconsin from 1984 to 1998, and as chief academic officer and then full-time theology professor at Concordia University Texas from 1998 to 2022. For the 2022-2023 year he served as Assisting Pastor at Redeemer Lutheran Church in Austin, Texas. During his sabbatical in Oxford, England, in 2004, he worked with Walter Hooper on Volume III of Collected Letters, the third and last volume of the letters of C. S. Lewis, by transcribing letters written by Lewis, convincing Walter Hooper to include the Great War letters, and doing bibliographical work on the book. A second sabbatical in 2012, this time in Cambridge, England, allowed him to do more work on Lewis, especially Lewis's essay "Modern Theology and Biblical Criticism" and Lewis's service on the Council of Westcott House, while staying at Westfield House, a theological college of the Evangelical Lutheran Church of England.

During the decade between 1987 and 1997, Heck edited a quarterly periodical called Evangelism, devoted to encouraging and equipping Christian people for outreach. Besides authoring or editing fifteen books, he has written numerous articles, book reviews, and essays, most notably on topics related to C. S. Lewis. He has donated the Joel D. Heck Collection at the Marion E. Wade Center, Wheaton College. This is a collection of letters related to Lewis and originally written to Heck about the experiences of former students of Lewis and their impressions of Lewis as a teacher. Heck has researched events in the life of C. S. Lewis, catalogued day by day and year by year throughout Lewis' life, an extensive database of more than 700,000 words and more than 1,300 pages of biographical information called "Chronologically Lewis" that is available on his website. This database has led to the publication of a C. S. Lewis calendar through Concordia University Press, several articles, and at least three books. The research also contains the military record of Lewis' brother, Warren Lewis.

Heck and his wife Cheryl have three adult children and have a home in Cincinnati, Ohio, where they currently live in retirement.

== Honors ==
- Winner of the Faculty Laureate award at Concordia University Wisconsin, 1994.
- Alumnus of the Year, Concordia University Wisconsin, 1998.
- Recipient of a Marion E. Wade research award for the research done that led to Irrigating Deserts: C. S. Lewis on Education (2005).
- Voted as the Faculty Member of the Year by the athletic teams of Concordia University Texas for the school year 2008-2009 and again for the school year 2010-2011.
- Recipient of the first faculty scholarship award from Concordia University Texas in Austin, Texas, 2015.

== Writings ==
In addition to articles published in The Journal of the Evangelical Theological Society, The Journal of Biblical Literature, and Bibliotheca Sacra, Heck has written many book reviews and more than forty articles for CSL: The Journal of the New York C.S. Lewis Society, Sehnsucht, The Lamp-Post, and The Chronicle of the Oxford C.S. Lewis Society.

- Make Disciples: Evangelism Programs of the Eighties (Concordia Publishing House, 1984).
- New Member Assimilation (Concordia Publishing House, 1988).
- The Art of Sharing Your Faith (Revell, 1991).
- All of the Above: Your Choice to Collegiate Success, editor (Concordia University Press, 1992).
- 264 Great Outreach Ideas (Concordia Publishing House, 2001).
- Evangelism and the Christian College, editor and author (Evangelism, 1994).
- From Guest to Disciple (Concordia Publishing House, 2001).
- Irrigating Deserts: C. S. Lewis on Education (Concordia Publishing House, 2005).
- The Personal Heresy: A Controversy, editor (authored by C. S. Lewis and E. M. W. Tillyard, Concordia University Press, 2008).
- History & Literature of the Old Testament (Kendall Hunt, 2010).
- Learning at the Foot of the Cross: A Christian Vision for Education (Concordia University Press, 2011).
- In the Beginning, God: Creation from God's Perspective (Concordia Publishing House, 2011).
- Socratic Digest (Concordia University Press, 2012, available only at www.Lulu.com).
- From Atheism to Christianity: The Story of C. S. Lewis (Concordia Publishing House, 2017).
- No Ordinary People: Twenty-One Friendships of C. S. Lewis (Winged Lion Press, 2021).
- The Lion That Roared (published with co-author Brenda Nauss at Lulu.com, 2023).

He also has written several devotional booklets (two for Advent and one for Lent) based on the writings of C. S. Lewis (2009: "A Grand Miracle", 2016: "Peace, Hope, Light", and 2015: "Mercy, Passion, & Joy") from Creative Communications for the Parish. These booklets collectively have sold more than a half-million copies.
