= Aelfrida Tillyard =

British writer (1883–1959)

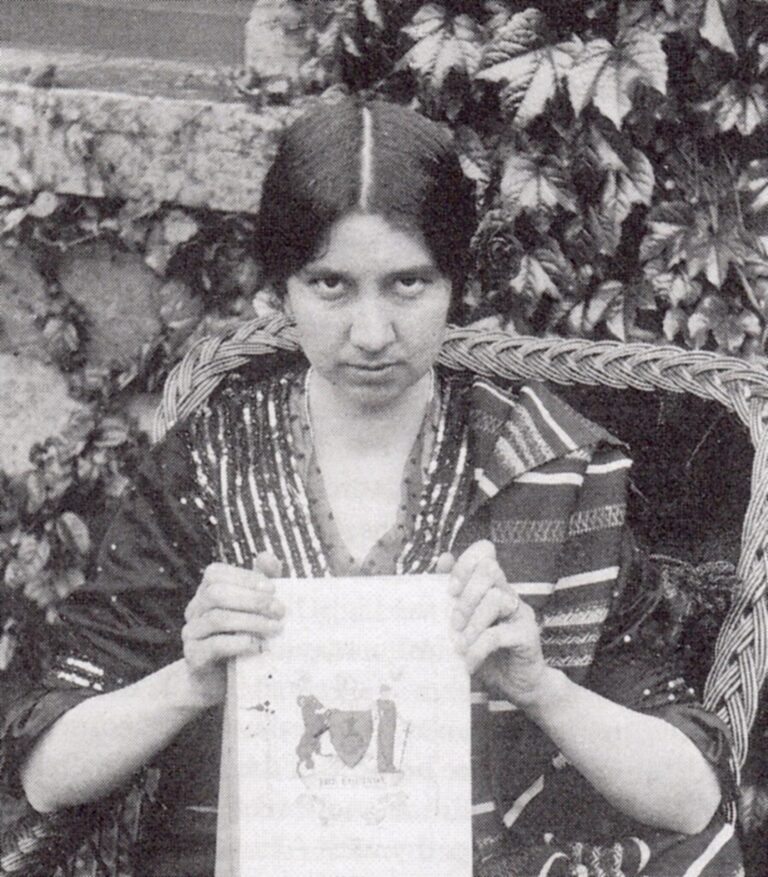
- Tillyard in 1913
- Born: Aelfrida Catharine Wetenhall Tillyard; 5 October 1883; Cambridge, England
- Died: 12 December 1959 (aged 76); St John's Home, Oxford, England
- Spouse: Constantine Cleanthes Graham (m. 1907; div. 1921)
- Children: 3
- Relatives: H. J. W. Tillyard (brother); E. M. W. Tillyard (brother); Robert John Tillyard (cousin); Agnes Elizabeth Slack (aunt); Stella Tillyard (great-niece)
- Writing career
- Genre: Science fiction

Aelfrida Catharine Wetenhall Tillyard (married name Graham, religious name Placida; 5 October 1883 – 12 December 1959) was a British author, medium, lecturer on Comparative Religion and associated religious topics, spiritual advisor and self-styled mystic. Tillyards' 1930 novel Concrete: A Story of Two Hundred Years Hence is seen as a forerunner of George Orwell's Nineteen Eighty-Four.

== Early life and family ==
Tillyard was born on 5 October 1883 in Cambridge to Alfred Isaac Tillyard (1852–1929), the proprietor and editor of the Cambridge Independent Press, and Catharine Sarah Tillyard (née Wetenhall; 1852–1932), a proponent of higher education for women. The second of four siblings, Tillyard was the sister of H. J. W. Tillyard, a classicist, Byzantinist and musicologist, and the classical and literary scholar E. M. W. Tillyard. Tillyard's brother Conrad (1885–1888) died in infancy, with the events surrounding his death traumatising her. The cousin of the entomologist Robert John Tillyard, Tillyard was the great-aunt of the author and historian Stella Tillyard.

Briefly attending The Perse School until around the age of 8 and a half, Tillyard was subsequently educated at home by a series of female tutors, which included Margaret Verrall. Raised in a liberal Nonconformist household, Tillyard began working as a Sunday school teacher in 1899. In order to complete her education, from 1900 and 1901 Tillyard spent time in Switzerland and Florence where she studied French and Latin. During her stormy adolescence, Tillyard underwent several mystico-religious experiences as a result of which she decided to dedicate her life to God's service. Bizarre manifestations of her dedication persuaded her parents that marriage was the only means of normalising her.

== Career ==
=== Early career and family life ===
In 1904, Tillyard met her future husband Constantine Cleanthes Michaelides (Later Graham; 1882–1934), a then undergraduate at King’s College, Cambridge, and became engaged by May. From around 1906 onwards, Tillyard taught prominently French and Italian in schools and to undergraduates. A breakdown in her physical and mental health ended the teaching career envisaged by her parents. On 19 January 1907, Graham and Tillyard married. The couple had three children, the youngest of whom was stillborn.

From 1907 until 1914 the Grahams lived in Russia, the United States, Germany and France as Constantine's Consular Service career dictated. After 1910 Tillyard and the two children remained in Cambridge. During the war and thereafter Tillyard claimed to experience unwanted and sometimes unwelcome visits from dead persons known to or hitherto unknown by her; these included members of her family, former members of the Society for Psychical Research, Rupert Brooke and Roger Casement. Already under strain because of Constantine's infidelities and Tillyard's moral and religious obsessions, the Grahams' marriage broke down irretrievably following her brief but influential foray into esotericism under the guidance of occultist Aleister Crowley in 1913.

Her compulsion to reveal marital discord and her own extramarital relationships in anthologies published in 1910, 1913 and 1916 also contributed to the failure of her marriage. The Grahams divorced in 1921. Constantine's consular career kept him abroad thereafter until his death in Berlin in 1934. Unlike her former husband, Tillyard never remarried but continued a series of intense friendships with younger men begun during her marriage, most notably with Ernest Altounyan, Hubert Henderson, Thomas Henn, John Layard, Juan Mascaro and Giovanni Papini. She also conducted one such friendship with a younger woman and one with the older French author Albert Erlande.

=== Mysticism and later career ===
In 1917 Tillyard came out as a mystic. Having already begun to record her mystico-spiritual experiences and their psychophysical manifestations in detailed diaries intended for posthumous publication, she also began to transcribe them in more or less fictionalised form in novels, homiletic books and moralistic short stories written between 1917 and 1958, some published, some not. In 1926 she wrote a biography of her aunt, Agnes Elizabeth Slack who campaigned for temperance. She documented her aunt's travels to speak about temperance in Ireland, Canada, America, Scandinavia and South Africa.

Following Alfred and Catharine Tillyard's respective deaths in 1929 and 1932, she decided to absolve herself of responsibility for her home and daughters in order to pursue her private and personal 'mystic way'. She was nevertheless dismayed when her daughters abandoned her, Alethea by becoming a nun and missionary, Agatha by suicide. In pursuit of her 'closer walk with God' Tillyard also became an Anglo-Catholic and (briefly) an extern oblate of St Mary's Abbey, West Malling, Kent.

Tillyard wrote two science fiction novels articulating her conservative political views. Concrete: A Story of Two Hundred Years Hence (1930) is set in an anti-religious dystopia controlled by the eugenics movement. The novel includes a character called "Big Brother" who leads a "Ministry of Reason" and there is also a propaganda department called the "Ministry of Aesthetics". The story has been compared to George Orwell's later Nineteen Eighty-Four. The Approaching Storm (1932) is another dystopia set in a Britain ruled by a left-wing dictatorship.

In 1934 she moved to Oxford to live an anchoritic life in a small house attached to the Convent of St Thomas the Martyr but a serious physical and mental breakdown in 1936 forced her to move to the protective environment afforded by the Society of the Sacred Cross at Tymawr Convent near Monmouth. She remained there as resident tertiary until asked to leave in 1946. From 1946 to 1953 she lived a semi-reclusive and prayerful but troubled life in two clergy houses in Cambridgeshire, effected a degree of rapprochement with her surviving daughter, and enjoyed a close relationship with her elder brother.

In 1953 increasing bodily infirmity forced a move to St John's Home in Oxford where she died six acrimonious years later. She bequeathed her notebooks, published and unpublished works, and 75 volumes of diaries to Girton College, Cambridge, of which her daughters were alumnae. The diaries were sealed until 2005.

== Published works ==
- Le Livre des Jeux (Blackie & Co London) 1906
- To Malise (Heffer & Sons Cambridge) 1910
- Cambridge Poets 1900-1913 (Heffer & Sons Cambridge) 1913
- Bammie's Book (Heffer & Sons Cambridge) 1915
- The Garden and the Fire (Heffer & Sons Cambridge) 1916
- The Making of a Mystic (Heffer & Sons Cambridge) 1917
- Vision Triumphant (James Clarke & Co London) 1919
- Verses for Alethea (Heffer & Sons Cambridge) 1920
- A Little Road-Book for Mystics (Faith Press London) 1922. Second edition (SCM Press London) 1931
- Messages (Faith Press London) 1924
- Agnes E. Slack (Heffer & Sons Cambridge) 1926
- Spiritual Exercises (SPCK London) 1927
- The Young Milliner (Hutchinson & Co London) 1929
- The Way We Grow Up (Hutchinson & Co London) 1929
- Can I Be a Mystic? (Rider & Co London) 1930
- Concrete (Hutchinson & Co London) 1930
- Haste to the Wedding (Hutchinson & Co London) 1931
- The Approaching Storm (Hutchinson & Co London) 1932
- The Closer Walk with God (SPCK London) 1935
- The Way of Praise (SPCK London) 1937
- The Night Watches (Faith Press London) 1938
- Memory Pictures (The Watchword) 1953-1958
- The Fruits of Silence (British Publishing Co Gloucester) 1949
- The Silence of God (British Publishing Co Gloucester) 1950
