= Agnes Elizabeth Slack =

English Temperance activist and writer (1858–1946)

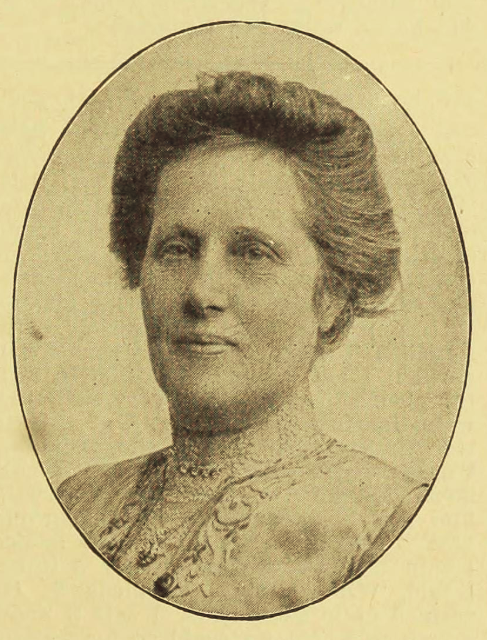
- Slack in 1922
- Born: 15 October 1858; Ripley, Derbyshire, England
- Died: 16 January 1946 (aged 87); Kettering, Northamptonshire, England
- Other name: Agnes Slack Saunders
- Occupations: Temperance activist; writer
- Organisations: Woman's Christian Temperance Union; British Women's Temperance Association
- Spouse: Charles Saunders (m. 1943; died 1944)
- Relatives: John Bamford Slack (brother)

Agnes Elizabeth Slack (married name Slack Saunders; 15 October 1858 – 16 January 1946) was an English Temperance activist and writer.

== Early life and education ==
Slack was born on 15 October 1858 in Ripley, Derbyshire to Thomas Slack (c. 1802–1882), a master brickmaker and property owner, and Mary Ann Slack (née Bamford; c. 1822–1903). Raised in a Liberal Wesleyan Methodist household, the family home Green Hill House was a local centre for religious discussion. (Note: Also cited as Greenhill House.) The second of three siblings, Slack was younger sister of the politician, solicitor and Methodist preacher John Bamford Slack.

Playing the organ at Chapel Street Wesleyan Church, Slack began a Sunday School for young girls at the age of 13. Initially educated at Miss Fletcher’s Academy in Ripley, at the age of 14 Slack was sent to boarding school in Lincoln. In Lincoln, Slack took both the Oxford junior and senior Local examinations and gained an Associate of Arts. Slack also took organ lessons with the organist of Lincoln Cathedral, and was known to be an accomplished organist, pianist and harpist. From 1910 to 1912, Slack attended biblical studies summer schools at Oxford and Cambridge.

== Career ==
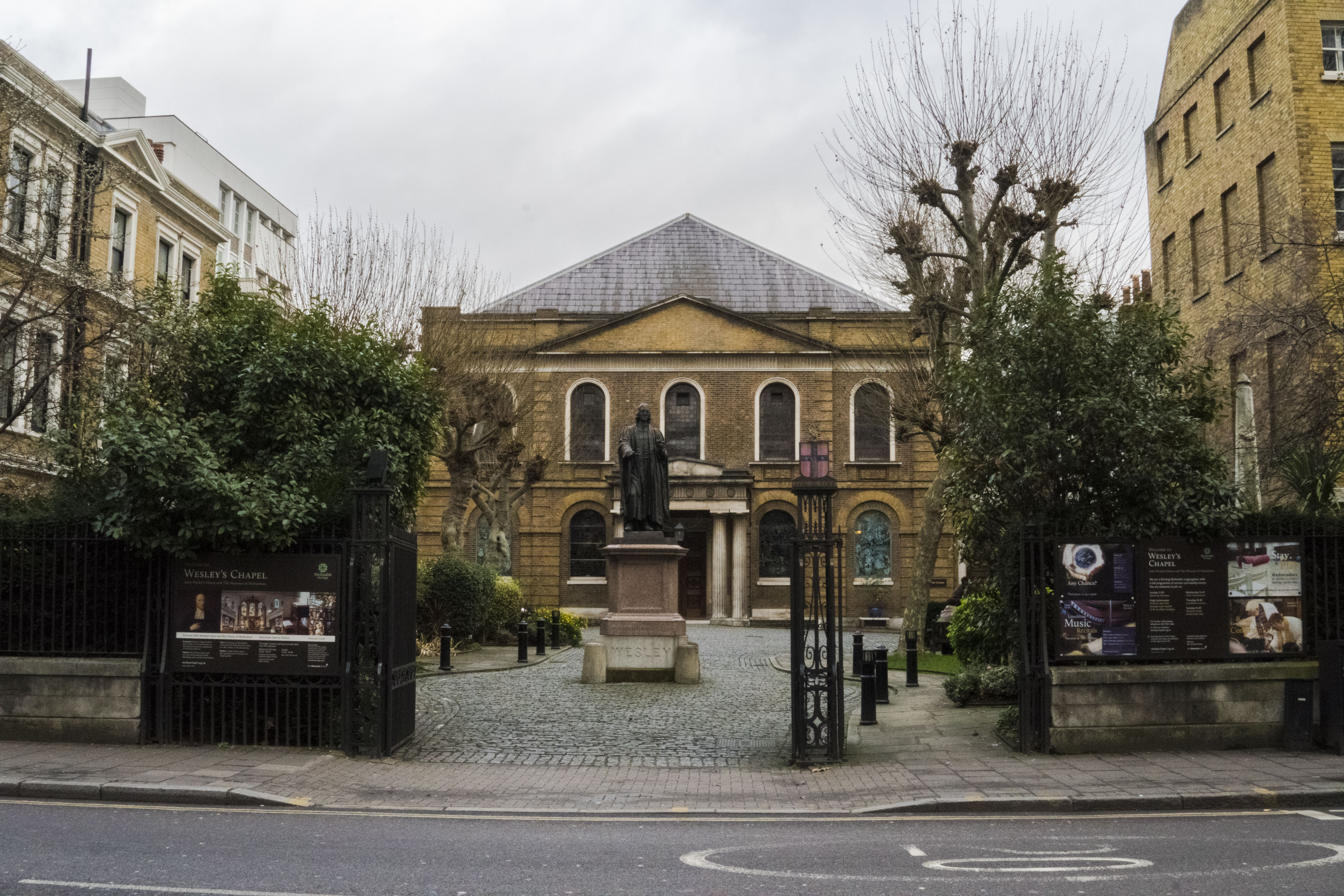
Slack was the first woman to preach in Wesley's Chapel

Methodists believed in temperance and religion was Slack's life's work. In 1895 she became the secretary of the British Women's Temperance Association and the World's Women's Christian Temperance Union.

Slack had good connections with the American Woman's Christian Temperance Union and she referred to their President, Lillian Stevens as "mother". She continued her education afterwards attending summer schools at Oxford and Cambridge in bible studies before the First World War. During this time she established strong links with the American vice-President Anna Adams Gordon in Boston. Gordon became the President of the Woman's Christian Temperance Union when Stevens died in 1914. In 1920 the United States banned alcohol.

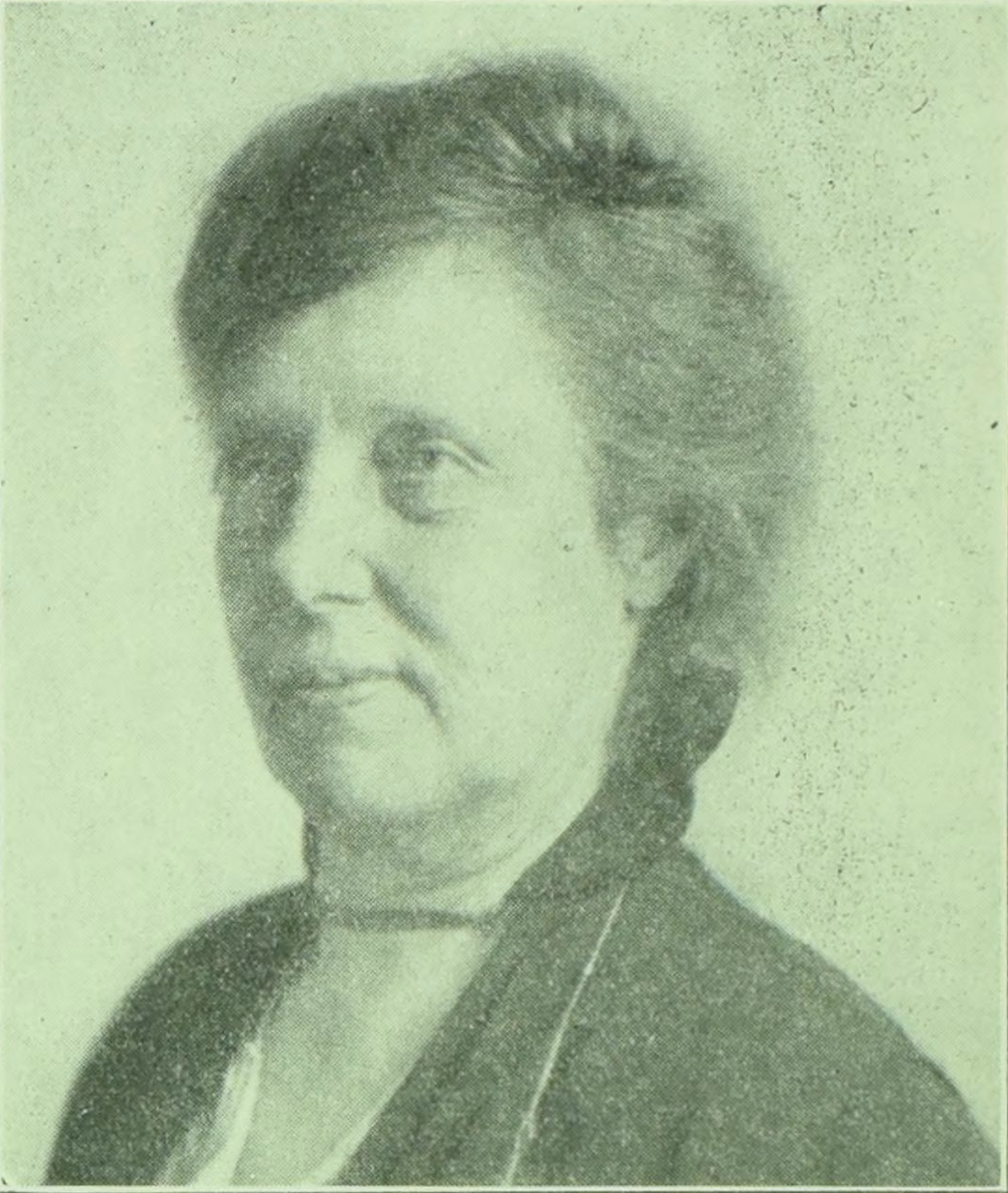
Slack in 1930

In 1925, there were two women's temperance organisation's in the UK, because of a disagreement over the suffrage movement in 1893. She was the last President of the National British Temperance Women's Association until it merged with the Women's Total Abstinence Union. As a result, she was the founding President of the National British Women's Total Abstinence Union. The following year, her niece Aelfrida Tillyard, published the first biography of her life, documenting her travels to Canada, America, Scandinavia and South Africa. In the same year she became the first woman to preach at Wesley's Chapel.

== Personal life ==
Slack was close friends with Lillian M. N. Stevens and Anna Adams Gordon. On 20 July 1943, Slack married Charles Saunders, a widowed architect and surveyor, The couple settled in Kettering, and Saunders died the following year.

On 16 January 1946, Slack Saunders died in Kettering aged 87.

== Bibliography ==
- “Agnes E. Slack” (“Two Hundred Thousand Miles Travel for Temperance in Four Continents”) by Aelfrida Tillyard, 1926. Published by W. Heffer & Sons Ltd, Cambridge, England.
- Slack, A. E. (1908), My travels in India, published by John Heywood Ltd, Manchester, England.
- People I have met and places I have seen: some memories of Agnes E. Slack, 1942
