= Caer Llan =

Centre and house in Monmouthshire, Wales

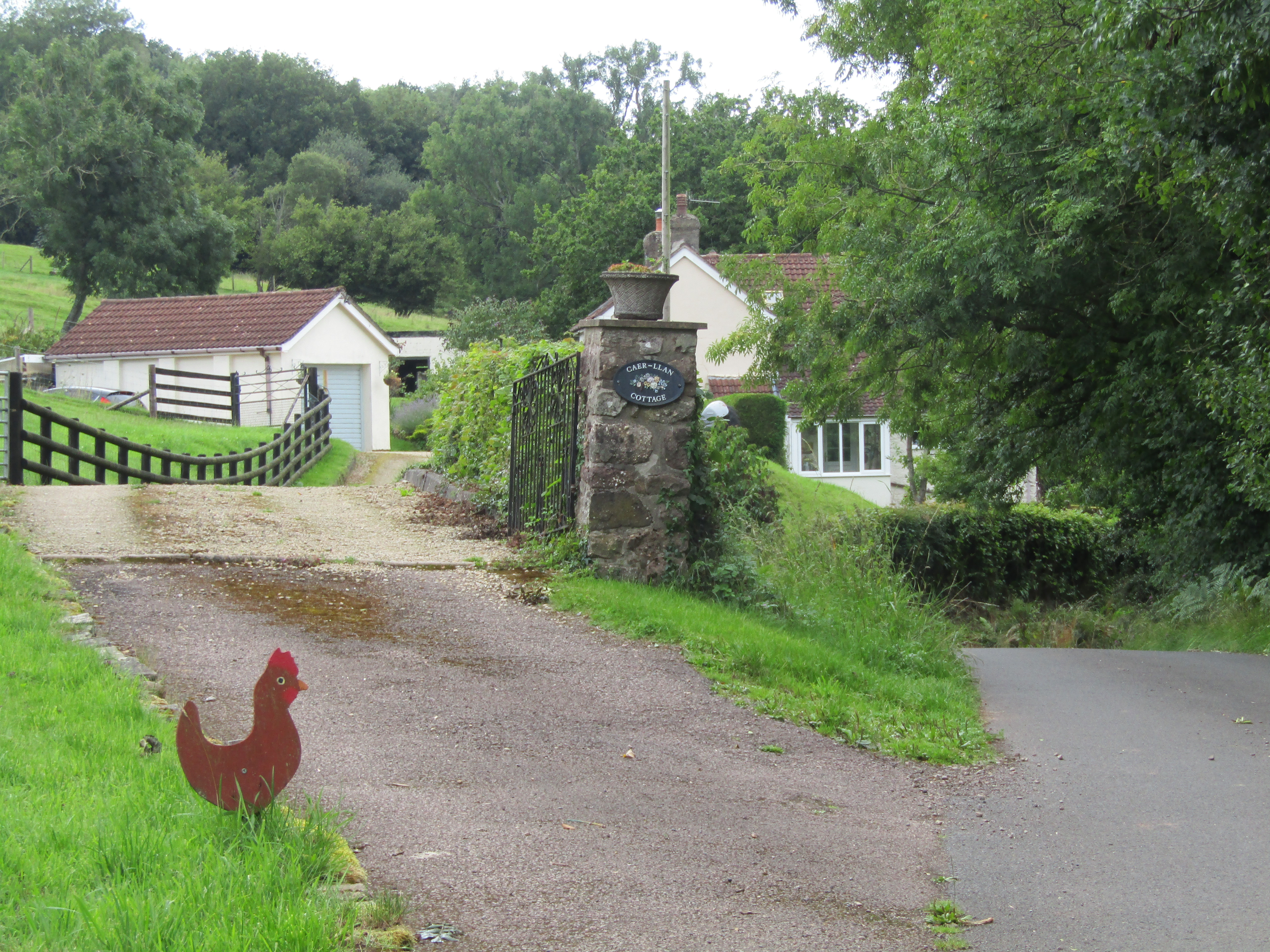
- Caer Llan Cottage on the edge of the estate
- Interactive map of the Caer Llan area

General information
- Location: Lydart, Mitchel Troy, Monmouthshire, Wales
- Coordinates: 51.7717°N 2.7391°W
- Construction started: c. 1800

Caer Llan is a field studies centre, conference centre and former country house located at Lydart within the community of Mitchel Troy, Monmouthshire, south east Wales, about 3 miles (4.8 km) south-west of Monmouth. It is close to the top of a scarp slope with extensive views westwards over the valley of the River Trothy, and is accessed from the B4293 road.

== The house and estate ==
The house is thought to have been originally built in about 1800. After being owned briefly by Richard Potter, chairman of the Great Western Railway Company, the estate was sold in 1866 to Dr. William Francis Price of Monmouth, who is credited as the first to introduce anaesthetics to Wales. He extended and modernised the house, before selling it in 1890 to Captain Henry Walters of the Royal Navy, who enlarged it further, adding two castellated towers and constructing a new driveway to the house's roadside lodge. He added terraces to the garden and a heated glasshouse with underground boilers, and also had built a large stable block. The Walters' family crest (with a misspelled motto) was added on the front of the house. In 1937 the estate passed to Henry Walters' nephew, Robnett Walters, who sold much of the estate but retained the house. He married a widow, Violet Barclay, and for a time ran a small boarding school in the house.

In 1969, the property was bought by Peter Carpenter, who began converting it into a field studies centre. It opened as a centre and a venue for conferences, study groups, field trips and workshops in 1971. The venue has been substantially expanded and developed in subsequent years. It now also hosts weddings and other events, and can provide overnight accommodation for 50 guests.

== Caer Llan Wood ==
The 5.3-hectare (13-acre) ancient woodland, to the south east of the centre, is a Site of Special Scientific Interest (SSSI), notified in 1981 for its biological characteristics. In this type of woodland in the lower Wye Valley, rare tree species occurring include the large-leaved lime (Tilia platyphyllos) and species of whitebeam, as well as pedunculate oak (Quercus robur) and wych elm (Ulmus glabra).
