= The Personal Heresy =

1965 book by C. S. Lewis and E. M. W. Tillyard

First edition

The Personal Heresy is a series of articles, three each by C. S. Lewis and E. M. W. (Eustace Mandeville Wetenhall) Tillyard, first published on 27 April 1939 by Oxford University Press and later reprinted, also by Oxford University Press, in 1965. The book has been reprinted in 2008 by Concordia University Press with an Introduction by Lewis scholar Bruce L. Edwards and a new Preface by the editor, Joel D. Heck. The central issue of the essays is whether a piece of imaginative writing, particularly poetry, is primarily a reflection of the author's personality (Tillyard's position) or is about something external to the author (Lewis's position). The two positions may be summarized briefly as the subjective position (Tillyard) and the objective position (Lewis). In general, Lewis attempts to keep poetry within the reach of the common person, while Tillyard thinks of the poet as a person who is "a cut above the common person."

== History ==
=== Origins ===
In the fifth essay in The Personal Heresy, Lewis implied that the personal heresy started when the romantic critics, such as Wordsworth, diverted our attention away from the fruitful question, "What kind of composition is a poem?" to the barren question, "What kind of man is a poet?" But various statements from the letters and diary of Lewis show that this position was held for quite some time before the first essay was published, and there is some evidence of the development of this position in Lewis himself. On 14 February 1923 Lewis recorded his own comment that was made in a conversation with a friend, George Arnold Rink, "I suggest that the object of a work of art is not to be criticized but to be experienced and enjoyed" (All My Road Before Me, 197). This argues for treating a work of art objectively. Then, in 1923 Lewis addressed the Martlets, an undergraduate Oxford literary society to which he belonged, arguing that the personal life of author James Stephens, a popular Irish author, had little to do with understanding his works. On 6 May 1924 Lewis wrote about a conversation with William Bateson, formerly Professor of Biology at Cambridge, disagreeing with Bateson's idea that a poem was mostly about the author: "he observed that as he progressed he found his interest in a poem centered more and more round the author. I said this seemed to me inconsistent with real aesthetic experience." Lewis's views seem well developed already at this point, at least on the basic position. On 20 May 1926 Lewis wrote in his diary about the personal heresy, which includes the idea that poets are special, stating, "Are all our modern poets like this? Were the old ones so? It is almost enough to prove R. Graves’ contention that an artist is like a medium: a neurotic with an inferiority complex who gets his own back by attributing to himself abnormal powers. And indeed I have noticed in myself a ridiculous tendency to indulge in poetical complacency as a consolation when I am ill at ease thro’ managing ordinary life worse than usual" In 1930 Lewis addressed the Martlets, this time as an Oxford Don, developing his thinking more fully. In that same year, E.M.W. Tillyard published a major work on John Milton, in which he wrote, "All poetry is about the poet's state of mind." To understand Paradise Lost correctly, he stated, one must read it as an "expression of Milton's personality." Then, on 14 June 1932, Lewis wrote to his brother Warren about the virtues of Thackeray vs. Trollope after having just finished rereading Thackeray's Pendennis. While he thought of Thackeray as a genius, he also thought that Trollope wrote the better books, books that don't knock you down with their power and depth. He stated, "What I don't care twopence about is the sense (apparently dear to so many) of being in the hands of 'a great man'--you know; his dazzling personality, his lightning energy, the strange force of his mind--and all that. So that I quite definitely prefer Trollope--or rather this re-reading of Pendennis confirms my long standing preference" (Collected Letters, Vol. II, 82). Also in 1932, Essays and Studies published Lewis’ essay, "What Chaucer Really Did to Il Filostrato." The title of the essay explains the content, i.e. that when Chaucer (1343–1400) revised the love poem Il Filostrato by Giovanni Boccaccio (1313–1375) in his Troilus and Criseyde he medievalized it, using a medieval rhetoric and didactic style. For example, Chaucer made Troilus less of a “lady-killer,” to use Lewis’ phrase. That shows up both in Chaucer's writing of the story and in his telling of the erotic nature of the story. An aspect of what was becoming Lewis’ contribution to The Personal Heresy showed up near the end of the essay, when Lewis mentioned Lascelles Abercrombie. Abercrombie had written an article, “A Plea for the Liberty of Interpreting,” for The Proceedings of the British Academy (1930). Lewis summarized Abercrombie's position as one that preferred the effect of Chaucer's Troilus on us now over that which it had on its original medieval audience. Lewis’ response demonstrated his conviction that much of the medieval age was closer to the world of universal ideas than the Renaissance was and, therefore, to be preferred and disagreeing with Abercrombie that we must first understand what a text said to its original audience before applying it to our situation today.

Lewis remained consistent on this position, later criticizing F. R. Leavis for accepting a major error of much of literary criticism, namely that writing was largely a function of the writer's personality. On 11 March 1944, Lewis wrote the essay, “The Parthenon and the Optative,” in which he made this criticism ("The Parthenon and the Optative," 111f.). Lewis had not changed his position when, in 1946, he wrote in "Different Tastes in Literature" that "some preferences in art are really better than others" (On Stories, 119).

=== Essays ===
The first three essays of The Personal Heresy were originally published in the journal Essays and Studies, a periodical of the English Association, in 1934, 1935, and 1936. The first was entitled "The Personal Heresy in Criticism," the second "Rejoinder," and the third "Open Letter to Dr Tillyard." Then three additional essays were added, along with a concluding note by Lewis and a Preface by both authors, and together they comprise The Personal Heresy. The controversy was concluded with a live debate at Magdalen College, Oxford, on 7 February 1939 (Collected Letters, Vol. II, 248, n. 24). Of this debate, former student John Lawlor wrote, "There was a memorable occasion when in the Hall at Magdalen Dr Tillyard met him to round off in debate the controversy begun with the publication of Lewis's indictment of "The Personal Heresy." I am afraid there was no debate. Lewis made rings round Tillyard; in, out, up, down, around back again—like some piratical Plymouth bark against a high-built galleon of Spain" (C. S. Lewis: Memories and Reflections, 4). Lewis's position in this work reflects his conviction that objective values are resident in people, places, events, and things, rejecting the relativistic mindset of that age and subsequent ages. Lewis's position was further developed in A Preface to Paradise Lost (1942) and reached its culmination in his 1961 work An Experiment in Criticism.

=== Correspondence ===
Some of Lewis's letters provide us with additional perspective on this controversy, showing Lewis to be aware of the potential for a negative view of him, but also showing Lewis to be congenial towards Tillyard himself. Lewis seems to discuss his first essay in a letter of 5 April 1935 to Paul Elmer More, aware that he might be pushing More if he sent him a copy of his essay. In a letter to Joan Bennett, February 1937, Lewis jokingly referred to this controversy by calling himself a "professional controversialist and itinerant prize-fighter" (Collected Letters, Vol. II, 210). There seemed to be no acrimony between the two men, for Lewis wrote about joining Tillyard in contributing chapters for a Festschrift to Sir Herbert Grierson (Collected Letters, Vol. II, 211, a letter dated 8 March 1937), and on 25 January 1938 Lewis wrote to Frank P. Wilson about meeting Tillyard in London and lunching together there (Collected Letters, Vol. II, 222). There is evidence that Lewis considered the heresy over, shortly after the publication of The Personal Heresy.

=== Aftermath ===
On 23 July 1939, about two months after the publication of the book, Lewis wrote to Owen Barfield, "I quite agree that the Personal Heresy is not important--now! But it was rapidly becoming so. I was just in the nick of time . . ." (Collected Letters, Vol. II, 260). On 12 September 1940 Jack wrote to Eliza Marian Butler, a University of Manchester professor at the time, stating that the kernel of The Personal Heresy was "Don't attribute superhuman qualities to poetry unless you really believe in a superhuman subject to support them" (Collected Letters, Vol. II, 443). In a letter of 14 January 1953, Lewis later wrote to Don Calabria, "The De Imitatione teaches us to 'Mark what is said, not who said it.'" By this comment he demonstrates that he held on to this point of view for many years. If the personal heresy had disappeared by 1940, it has come back in our day which has drunk so deeply of what Lewis called "the poison of subjectivism" (the title of an essay by Lewis in Christian Reflections, published in Religion in Life, Summer 1943). More than two decades later, Lewis would write (posthumously in 1964), "Even today there are those (some of them critics) who believe every novel and even every lyric to be autobiographical" (The Discarded Image, 213).

The two men referred, with respect, to one another in their later published works. "Tillyard was seemingly more affected by the debate, as he makes more references to his opponent than does Lewis" (Beach, 14).

== Chapter-by-chapter summary ==
=== Chapter One ===
Some publishers are claiming to be able to offer insights into “young soldier poets” that even those soldiers poets do not have. It is as though the publisher were saying, “You might have read their poetry, but we know what they were really saying. We can read between the lines.” Poetry is increasingly believed to be the “expression of personality” rather than writing on a topic, and that is the personal heresy. Lewis disagrees, stating that poetry is not a representation of a personality. This tendency appears not only in poetry, Lewis writes, but also in advertising and in reputable criticism. Tillyard's book Milton is the prime example of this, as are Sir Henry John Newbolt's The Teaching of English in England, Hugh Kingsmill's book on Matthew Arnold, some of T. S. Eliot's writing, and perhaps even H.W. Garrod's book on Wordsworth. Tillyard wrote in his book Milton that such matters as style “have concerned the critics far more than what the poem is really about, the true state of Milton’s mind when he wrote it.”

As an example of what poetry is about, Lewis cites a poem, part of William Wordsworth's Prelude. There is a personality in a poem, says Lewis, but we don't know whose. We meet the poet “only in a strained and ambiguous sense” (9f.). Especially in drama we meet the poet's creation rather than the poet. In order to write poetry, the poet must use words to suggest what is public, common, impersonal, and objective. That is why we can understand his poetry. That is also why the poetry can't be about the poet's personality, because the personality of a poet we have not met is private. Poetry annihilates personality rather than asserts it, because it draws on the common experience of all people (23). And, for Lewis, personality is one's “daily temper and habitual self” (21). The poet arranges the words, but the experience is a common one. Then Lewis uses three analogies to illustrate his point: the poet is “not a spectacle but a pair of spectacles” (12), the poet is like a scout who brings a report to the commander in a time of war, and the poet is window through which we attend to the landscape (23). The position of a window is analogous to the personality of the poet; we see through both of them, in one instance the outdoors and in the other instance the subject of the poem. In short, Lewis argues for an objective, or impersonal, point of view, that poetry is about something out there, while Tillyard argues for a subjective, or personal, point of view, that poetry is about something inside the poet.

Lewis ends the chapter by arguing that the personal heresy comes from an inability of most modern people to decide between a materialist and a spiritual theory of the universe. Either view would end the personal heresy. If the universe has a god behind it, then He speaks through the poet and it's not the poet only who speaks. If there is no god, there is no Muse who inspires the poet, and so there is nothing inside the head of the poet except a fortuitous concourse of atoms (25).

=== Chapter Two ===
Tillyard begins his Rejoinder in chapter two by saying that he thinks the personal heresy is not a sign of modernity, but a bit shop-soiled. It's been around a while, and Lewis later concedes the point. He then proceeds to challenge Lewis's definition of personality, which seems to include trivial details about the author rather than the author's mental pattern, his habitual and normal self, the big picture if you will, but not his “practical and everyday personality” (30). Personality in poetry includes such things as style and rhythm. We can agree with Tillyard to an extent, and Lewis himself does. He says that he does not deny the difference between the poetry of Shakespeare and that of Racine (22). After all, many of us recognize the musical style of J. S. Bach as distinct from most other composers, and we know the Beach Boys when we hear them. The same is true of certain ethnic foods, for no one would consider bratwurst and sauerkraut to be Chinese food or tacos to be an example of Thai cuisine. A certain cook's style might be seen in his preference for some foods, his use of parsley to decorate a plate, a preference for certain side dishes or colors, or other things, as Lewis and Tillyard would both probably agree, but Lewis would insist that the dinner is still primarily about the good food that satisfies the palate and the stomach of the eater rather than being about the cook's personality, even though that is present. In a hungry moment, I believe that Tillyard would also.

Tillyard says there is an analogy between the mental pattern in a poet's life and that mental pattern expressed in his art, but Lewis distinguishes between life and art. Tillyard agrees with Lewis that we shouldn't mix biography and criticism by allowing our knowledge of the author's life to take shortcuts and make hasty conclusions because we think we know the author. But Lewis is too concerned about things (37), writes Tillyard, and too little concerned with people.

Another thing that Tillyard begins to do in this chapter is to suggest that the poet is a cut above the average person, for example, by writing about “the superior penetration of poetic genius” (38); later he will call Wordsworth “a superior person” (68) and Milton one “who is truly virtuous.” He will say that Milton “has inhabited heavens and hells unbearable by the ordinary man” (74) and that Shakespeare “reached a sanity richer than the normal” (75). We will see Lewis challenging that assumption, stating that Milton and Wordsworth are simply great men who happen to be poets rather than great poets who are superior people.

=== Chapter Three ===
Lewis begins chapter three by expressing appreciation for Tillyard's "rational opposition." Tillyard apparently has four objections to Lewis's position. First, Tillyard distinguishes between trivial accidents in a personality and a mental pattern. Second, Tillyard thinks that the poet is most himself when he is least himself. Third, Tillyard thinks that Lewis confuses the means of communication with that which is communicated. Fourth, Tillyard objects to Lewis's preference of things to people.

Against Tillyard's dismissal of personal details, Lewis says that trivialities often give one the essence of a personality, such as the fatness of Falstaff in Shakespeare's play. But the greater question still remains—even if personality is more of a mental pattern, what do we see through those mental patterns that Tillyard insists on as the center of personality? He wonders if Tillyard has not made an unconscious pun by arguing that individuality in artistic work is done by an individual, which suggests a single personality (47f.).

Lewis says that we don't owe the personality an aesthetic response; we owe him love. The latter is in the realm of ethics and is not within the purview of imaginative literature and its appropriate response. We love and serve our neighbor, but we appreciate our artists.

Lewis offers three dilemmas, or three ways of offending against personality: (1) first, that encounter with a real personality forces us out of the world of poetry, (2) second, that it is uncivil to ignore what a person says and think instead of the person, and (3) third, that poetry is in danger of becoming Poetolatry, that is, the worship of poetry.

Part of Lewis's second dilemma is that in social life, it is not civil to think about the person who addresses us in conversation instead of thinking about what he says. I would agree, since ad hominem arguments are often the typical response to the person whose position we cannot refute. “Well, you only say that because you’re a man (or a woman).” Or, “You’re one to talk about relationships; you can’t even get along with your next door neighbor.” Statements like that don't address the issue, Lewis says; they obscure it. Or, as Jay Budziszewski says, “Sir, I understand the insult, but what is the argument?”

When Lewis warns against what he calls Poetolatry, i.e. the idolatry of poetry, he mentions Matthew Arnold who once said that poetry would replace religion. Using alliteration, Lewis laments “this collapse from criticism into cult” (54). The cult of poetry, Lewis says, is taking on two religious characteristics: (1) the worship of saints (such as biographies of Keats and Lawrence) and (2) traffic in relics. Appreciation is the appropriate response to good poetry, not worship. We can't deify “Christ, Shakespeare, and Keats” because of their heterogeneity. We can obey Christ, but not Shakespeare or Keats! The dead poet is not sentient! It won't do any good to serve a dead poet unless you believe in praying for the dead. Our living neighbor is the true object of our loving service (56). “It is a serious thing to live in a society of possible gods and goddesses, to remember that the dullest and most uninteresting person you talk to may one day be a creature which, if you saw it now, you would be strongly tempted to worship, or else a horror and a corruption.” Lewis was constantly on the watch for possible gods and goddesses that became a corruption, and poetry was a candidate for that status.

=== Chapter Four ===
Early in this chapter, Tillyard agrees with Lewis that "Poetry... must give the green to the tree and not to our eyes" (60), and he concedes Lewis's position as a possible one (60), i.e. that in Robert Herrick's poem about Julia the issue is Julia herself, not the fact of the poet's awakening towards Julia. He didn't mean to suggest that the personal was the only concrete, nor did he think Lewis oblivious to Julia. But Tillyard insists that the poet's state of mind when he writes is still an issue. Tillyard withdraws his third charge, i.e. that Lewis confused the means of communication with that which is communicated. He admits that he was vague regarding the uniqueness of the Delphic Charioteer. Then he writes about three different types of uniqueness—that which is not repeatable, that which is unified, and that which has a uniqueness combined with kinship and recognition. He then argues that the little things count for much in a person's mental pattern. He says that the dead poet can do something for us by setting an example and thereby bringing comfort and courage.

Tillyard sees continuity between the life of the artist and the products of the artist's creativity, while Lewis sees discontinuity between them. Tillyard agrees that one can inappropriately mix life and art. Each one sees his own position better than the other person's position and that the two of them are not that far apart. When Tillyard visits a piece of Romanesque architecture, he thinks he shares something with the architect, and he is probably right. But Lewis would suggest that 98% of what one sees is the product of the architect and only 2% comes from the architect's personality, while Tillyard would probably put that 2% figure at 10% or even higher. In the last chapter, Tillyard says "that personality accounts for only a part" (115) of poetry. He probably meant "a small part."

Tillyard also agrees with Lewis that at times the little things matter a great deal for what they say about the writer's personality, but only if those little things are part of the essence of the individual's personality. On this point, they agree. They have been talking past one another. Now they are on the same page.

Near the end of the chapter, Tillyard says, "Poetry is more complex than scouting..." (75), harking back to an illustration in Lewis's first chapter. This is an elitist view that has no conception of what is involved in scouting, primarily because Tillyard knows poetry but does not know the outdoors, the advance scout in a military or geographical expedition, or the intricacies of a piece of terrain. Lewis champions the common person, the ordinary person who is really not ordinary.

At the end of the chapter, Tillyard says that, although personality counts for little in a poet like Tennyson, personality has two functions in literature—(1) to allow the reader to share with the author and (2) to serve as an example to the reader. He wonders if he and Lewis can resolve their dispute into a matter of terminology, especially a different definition of the word "personality."

=== Chapter Five ===
In chapter five Lewis states that he does not find Tillyard's three senses of the word "unique." Lewis states a problem he has with the disparagement of common things and common men by Poetolaters (and he implies that Tillyard has slipped into this category). This point continues the debate over poetry and poets, i.e. whether the poet is a cut above or not. Lewis's own position was greatly influenced by his friend Arthur Greeves, who taught him to enjoy common things, and Lewis learned to see that these common things explain a want or longing or desire that has been "prepared from all eternity" (80).

Lewis agrees with Tillyard on two points. First, Lewis agrees that the poet's personality can serve as an example to the reader, but he says that it's not the normal function of poetry or the poet any more than the function of a volume of Shakespeare is to support a rickety table that has one leg shorter than another, although it could do so in a pinch. He also agrees on the sharing function of the poet's personality, which is Lewis's view exactly. We share the poet's consciousness and look with his eyes, not in reciprocity (as in mutual love when the lovers look at each other) but in sympathy or "feeling together" (when the poet and the reader of poetry both look at the same thing).

We are not sharing the personality of the poet. No, we share what is common to the poet and to us. We share his common, human experience, not his personality. There are two kinds of poetry: (1) poetry about common experiences that all people have, and (2) poetry about new and nameless sensations that enrich one, which he also sees in the prose of George MacDonald, and this suggests that it is not unique to poetry.

Lewis then implies that the personal heresy started when the romantic critics, such as William Wordsworth, diverted our attention away from the fruitful question, "What kind of composition is a poem?" to the barren question, "What kind of man is a poet?" (86)

Next, Lewis offers his own theory of poetry, starting with definitions of poetic language, poetry, and poem. Poetry uses concrete language to meet what we meet in life, while philosophical and scientific language uses abstract language. Poetry is "a skill or trained habit of using all the extra-logical elements of language—rhythm, vowel-music, onomatopoeia, associations, and what not—to convey the concrete reality of experience" (89). He defines a poem as "a composition which communicates more of the concrete and qualitative than our usual utterances do" (90). But, he says, sometimes poets do this communicating worse than non-poets.

What is the value of poetry? If poetry is to be understood by the mass of readers, it requires two things.

1. That the poetry be interesting and entertaining (the pleasure factor). 2. That the poetry have "a desirable permanent effect" on us (like food, which should be both nourishing and palatable) (the profit factor).

Then Lewis writes about reviewers, stating that the only essential qualifications for criticism are "general wisdom and health of mind" (96). He deplores those reviewers who use words such as "sincerity," "bogus." and "sham" to criticize writing because they have "not yet discovered what is wrong" (98) with a piece of writing rather than using the pleasure factor and the profit factor as a guide.

Perhaps you have noticed that Lewis's tendency in this chapter has been "to lower the status of the poet as poet" (99), to return the poet to humility. There are no ordinary people, but by this Lewis means that everyone is on the same plane, participating in the image of God as God's children, but no one category of people is above the rest, even though there are many differences between people.

=== Chapter Six ===
In chapter six Tillyard retains his two kinds of sharing, that of sharing with authors and that of sharing with nature and animals. Tillyard agrees that the function of the poet serving as an example is not inherent in the poet's nature (102), he welcomes Lewis's two kinds of poetry, and he defends his view that poets are separate from the man on the street (104) and he argues that they are a cut above. He agrees when Lewis attacks the Romantics for concentrating on the poet rather than the poetry, and he agrees that poetolatry damages poetry. But not all Romantics put poets into a class part. Neither Landor nor Shelley did. He thinks that the feelings of poets “are much more interesting” and that they excel in the matter of courage (105f.).

But the key theme of this chapter is what poetry is about. Since Lewis did not fully answer that question, Tillyard offers his own theory of poetry. What is poetry about?

First, poetry is partially about rendering personality or a mental pattern as an author's object or end (114), but also about much more. Second, “poetry is concerned with large general states of mind” (114), universal ideas like anger and hatred. Third, poetry is about areas of feeling, such as new sensations, enrichments of experience (as Lewis stated). Fourth, poetry is about something very new. A footnote by Lewis agrees. Fifth, poetry is about something very old, such as the experience of rebirth.

All of these categories, states Tillyard, are universal to man and therefore accessible to everyone. So, in a sense, Tillyard agrees with Lewis's plea for the Common Reader and for poetry to be seen as something that anyone can appreciate, although he still thinks the poet a higher person than the rest. Winsomely and imaginatively, Tillyard concludes his last chapter with this sentence about Lewis: “He is, indeed, the best kind of opponent, good to agree with when one can, and for an enemy as courteous as he is honest and uncompromising, the kind of opponent with whom I should gladly exchange armor after a parley, even if I cannot move my tent to the ground where his own is pitched” (119). By the way, there is a five-page Note that Lewis appends to the end where he deals with the question, “Does poetry carry a creative or a recording function?” And he concludes that it does both.

== Significance ==
- On 12 September 1940, Jack wrote to Eliza Marian Butler, a University of Manchester professor at the time, stating that the kernel of The Personal Heresy was “Don’t attribute superhuman qualities to poetry unless you really believe in a superhuman subject to support them.”
- Lewis's position in The Personal Heresy reflects his conviction that objective values are resident in people, places, events, and things, rejecting the relativistic mindset of that age and subsequent ages.
- This book also teaches us that good teaching is about two things in particular: the subject matter of the course of study (Lewis's primary concern) and the passion resident in the personality of the teacher (Tillyard's primary concern).
- Another lesson from The Personal Heresy is for the pride of the poet, and everyone else's pride, to be held in check, but, correspondingly, to realize that we are made in the image of God. Lewis both challenges the elitism of some poets and elevates the cause of the common man.
- A Lewis Tutorial: In his Introduction, Bruce Edwards says that reading this book is like taking a tutorial with Lewis (xi). If you ever wished you could have had Lewis for a teacher, you can... by reading this book.
- Another thing about the book's significance is its tone. The book is subtitled “A Controversy.” In the original Preface, we read that the authors, both Lewis and Tillyard, thought that “a revival of the art of Controversy would be a good thing.” They stated that this style was preferable to one of backbiting and abuse (xi). As you read the book, you will note the kind and generous statements that both Lewis and Tillyard make towards one another. This friendship goes back many years. In 1962, Lewis wrote to Colin Eccleshare, an editor with Cambridge University Press, "Perhaps you could say that my book and World Picture were both the progeny of discussion between him and me, away back in the '20s?" Lewis was referring to Tillyard's The Elizabethan World Picture and his own forthcoming publication, The Discarded Image (Collected Letters, III, 1397).

== Notes and quotes ==
- Some suggest that Tillyard is the model for Eustace Scrubb in The Voyage of the "Dawn Treader" and The Silver Chair, since Tillyard's first name was Eustace. This, however, is not likely, given the respect with which Lewis treated Tillyard in this exchange on the personal heresy. Eustace was chosen as a name for that Dawn Treader character because of the sound of the name, making possible the jokes about “useless” and “used to it” in the presence of the now aged and hard of hearing Trumpkin. Lewis was known for writing not only for the eye, but also for the ear.
- In a letter dated 10 August 1946, Lewis wrote to Ruth Pitter about the special use of a noun in poetry. One of the examples he used was a line from Robert Herrick's "Upon Julia's Clothes," one of the poems discussed in The Personal Heresy. The part of Herrick's poem that Lewis quoted to Pitter was this: "how sweetly flows That liquefaction of her clothes." He underlined the word liquefaction to indicate that this was the noun he meant to indicate a special use in this poem.
- Lewis wrote in the first chapter, "I... maintain that when we read poetry as poetry should be read, we have before us no representation which claims to be the poet, and frequently no representation of a man, a character, or a personality at all" (5).
- Again Lewis wrote, "I look with his eyes, not at him. He, for the moment, will be precisely what I do not see; for you can see any eyes rather than the pair you see with, and if you want to examine your own glasses you must take them off your own nose. The poet is not a man who asks me to look at him; he is a man who says 'look at that' and points; the more I follow the pointing of his finger the less I can possibly see of him" (11).
- "I must make of him not a spectacle but a pair of spectacles" (12).
- Chapter Three: "Some time ago Matthew Arnold prophesied that poetry would come to replace religion... the cult of poetry is taking on some secondary religious characteristics—notably the worship of saints and the traffic in relics" (54).
- Chapter Five: "...there is no essential qualification for criticism more definite than general wisdom and health of mind" (96).
- "The Ugly Duckling has stuck too deep in our minds, and we are afraid to condemn any abortion lest it should prove in the end to be a swan. It is high time to remember another story in Hans Andersen which teaches a lesson at least equally important. It is called The Emperor’s New Clothes" (99).
- Tillyard on Lewis: “He is, indeed, the best kind of opponent, good to agree with when one can, and for an enemy as courteous as he is honest and uncompromising, the kind of opponent with whom I should gladly exchange armor after a parley, even if I cannot move my tent to the ground where his own is pitched” (119).
- Tillyard more frequently uses the views of other critics, while Lewis relies primarily on his own reading of texts.
- Tillyard was one of the six Electors who elected Lewis to the newly created Chair of Medieval and Renaissance English at Cambridge University. The other Electors were J. R. R. Tolkien, Henry Stanley Bennett, David Knowles, F.P. Wilson, and Basil Willey. The election, chaired by Sir Henry Willink, took place in May 1954. Willink offered Lewis the chair on 11 May 1954.
- Charles Beach judges the debate itself to have ended in a stalemate (16).

== Bibliographical notes ==
- Beach, Charles Franklyn (January–February 2007), "C. S. Lewis vs. E. M. W. Tillyard: The Personal Heresy", CSL: The Bulletin of the New York C. S. Lewis Society, 38 (1): 1–18.
- Heck, Joel D (November–December 2008), "The Personal Heresy: Scholars Can Be Gentleman", CSL: The Bulletin of the New York C. S. Lewis Society, 39 (6): 1–8.
- Jack's "Personal Heresy": The Politics of Poetics, Pseudobook.
