= Theagenes of Rhegium =

Ancient Greek literary critic

- Born: c. 6th century BCE; Rhegium

Philosophical work
- Era: Pre-Socratic philosophy
- Region: Ancient Greek philosophy
- Language: Ancient Greek
- Main interests: Homeric scholarship
- Notable ideas: Allegorical interpretation

Theagenes of Rhegium (Greek: Θεαγένης ὁ Ῥηγῖνος, Theagenēs ho Rhēginos; fl. 529–522 BC) was a Greek literary critic of the 6th century BC from Rhegium (modern Reggio Calabria), in Magna Graecia.

Theagenes's writings are lost, the only information about his life or his doctrines must be reconstructed from summaries, fragments and characterizations of his work in later authors. Theagenes was one of the earliest proponents of the allegorical method of reading texts, defending the mythology of Homer from more rationalist attacks, possibly as a response to the criticisms of early Greek philosophers such as Xenophanes. It has also been argued that Pherecydes of Syros anticipated Theagenes.

For indeed they say that the dry fights with the wet, the hot with the cold, and the light with the heavy; furthermore, that water extinguishes fire, but fire dries water. Similarly, the opposition accrues to all the elements out of which the universe consists ... He [Homer] arranges battles by naming fire Apollo ... the water Poseidon ... the moon Artemis, the air Hera.

Theagenes, as recounted in Porphyry's Homeric Questions 20.67–75, in John A. MacPhail. Porphyry’s ‘Homeric Questions’ on the Iliad: Text, Translation, Commentary. Berlin and New York: De Gruyter, 2011, page 241.

== Ancient sources ==
In the Diels-Kranz numbering for testimony and fragments of Pre-Socratic philosophy, Theagenes of Rhegium is catalogued as number 8. The most recent edition of this catalogue is: Diels, Hermann; Kranz, Walther (1957). Plamböck, Gert (ed.). Die Fragmente der Vorsokratiker (in Ancient Greek, Latin, and German). Rowohlt. ISBN 5875607416..

His fragments are reprinted with notes and an Italian translation in Giuliana Lanata, Poetica Pre-platonica: Testimonianze e Frammenti (Florence 1963) 104-111.
- 1. Tatian. Address to the Greeks. 31.2.
- 1a. Scholia on Dionysius Thrax. 164.23-29.
- 2. Porphyry (philosopher). Scholia on the Iliad. 20.67.
- 3. Scholia on the Iliad. A 381.
- 4. "Theagenes' property and Aeschines' too". Suda.
