= Society of the Sacred Cross =

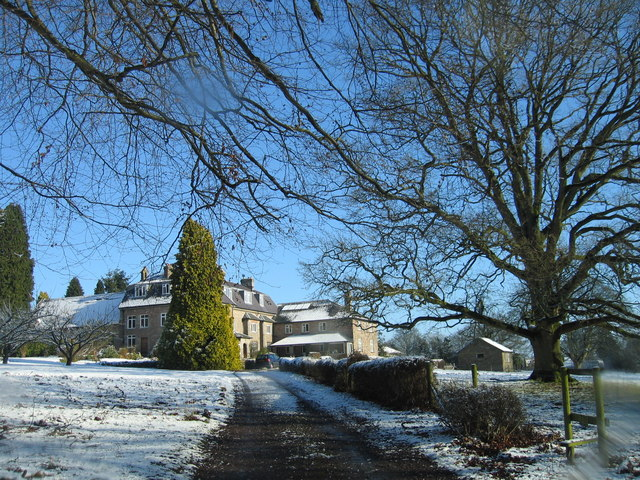
The convent at Ty Mawr, Monmouthshire

The Society of the Sacred Cross is an Anglican religious order founded in Chichester, Sussex, in 1910. It established a community at Tymawr, Lydart, Monmouthshire, in 1923 with guidance from Fr G. Northcott of the Community of the Resurrection. The society today consists of fewer than ten professed sisters, with several oblates and associates.
