= E. M. W. Tillyard =

English classical scholar (1889–1962)

E. M. W. Tillyard OBE
- Born: Eustace Mandeville Wetenhall Tillyard; 19 May 1889; Cambridge, Cambridgeshire, England
- Died: 24 May 1962 (aged 73); Cambridge, Cambridgeshire, England
- Resting place: Histon Road Cemetery
- Spouse: Phyllis Beatrice Tillyard (m. 1919)
- Children: 3
- Relatives: H. J. W. Tillyard (brother); Aelfrida Tillyard (sister); Olive Mudie-Cooke (sister-in-law); Robert John Tillyard (cousin); Stella Tillyard (granddaughter)

Academic background
- Education: Jesus College, Cambridge
- Military career
- Allegiance: United Kingdom
- Branch: British Army
- Units: British Expeditionary Force (1915–1916); British Salonika Army (1916–1919)
- Conflict: First World War
- Awards: War Cross

Eustace Mandeville Wetenhall Tillyard OBE (19 May 1889 – 24 May 1962), known as E. M. W. Tillyard, was an English classical and literary scholar who served as the Master of Jesus College from 1945 to 1959.

== Early life and education ==
Tillyard was born on 19 May 1889 in Cambridge to Alfred Isaac Tillyard (1852–1929), the proprietor and editor of the Cambridge Independent Press, and Catharine Sarah Tillyard (née Wetenhall; 1852–1932), a proponent of higher education for women. The youngest of four siblings, Tillyard was the brother of the Byzantinist H. J. W. Tillyard and the writer and mystic Aelfrida Tillyard. Through his father, Tillyard was the cousin of the entomologist Robert John Tillyard.

Educated at St Faith's School and The Perse School, Tillyard entered Jesus College in 1909 to study the Classical Tripos. (Note: Also cited as 1908.) Awarded the Craven studentship in 1911, Tillyard traveled to Greece where he studied at the British School of Archaeology at Athens and catalogued Greek sculptures at Smyrna.

== Career ==
Tillyard was a fellow of Jesus from 1913 to 1915. His knowledge of Greek helped him during the First World War, where he served with the British Expeditionary Force (1915–1916), the Salonika Force (1916–1919) and then as liaison officer with the Greek headquarters (1918–1919). He was made an Officer of the Order of the British Empire in the 1919 Birthday Honours "for services rendered in connection with military operations in the Balkans". He also received the War Cross from Greece.

Following the war, he returned to Cambridge and devoted himself to the newly established English School. According to The Times: "Although not one of the Founding Fathers of the School, he rapidly became one of its central figures and its leading statesman—a position which, in spite of many changes in organization and personnel, he never really lost until his retirement from his University Lectureship in 1954. His influence was not mainly due to his very considerable gifts as a University politician; it was essentially the result of his whole-hearted devotion to the cause of English. Others may have won more widespread celebrity as scholars or as critics, but everyone in Cambridge knew that Tillyard, because of his selfless and unremitting thought and care for the good of the School, was its chief mainstay."

Tillyard was a Fellow in English (1926–1959) at Jesus College, later becoming Master (1945–1959). He is known mainly for his book The Elizabethan World Picture (1943), as background to Elizabethan literature, particularly Shakespeare, and for his works on John Milton. He is credited with having put forward the view that Elizabethan literature is not representative of "a brief period of humanism between two outbreaks of Protestantism" (viz., the English Reformation and the Thirty Years' War), but rather representative of a theological bond in England that allowed for a continuation of the medieval view of World Order.

His historical scholarship and contextual analysis informed the study of 16th-century literature and became the foundation for much of what Cambridge undergraduates would study in preparation for their examinations.

== Personal life ==
On 27 March 1919, Tillyard married the classical archaeologist Phyllis Beatrice Cooke (1887–1971) at Christ Church, Paddington. (Note: Also cited as Mudie Cooke.) Cooke was the sister of the artist Olive Mudie-Cooke and the maternal granddaughter of Charles Edward Mudie, the founder of Mudie's Lending Library. Tillyard and Cooke had three children, and were the grandparents of the author and historian Stella Tillyard.

On 24 May 1962, Tillyard died at Hope Nursing Home in Cambridge and was buried at Histon Road Cemetery.

== Works ==
The English Faculty
...
Speak, Muse, awhile, of those fall'n angels there,
Who long to split each Muse's separate hair;
Who analyse the poets' every freak,
And label it as "direct" or "oblique".
I. A. Richards thinks there's nothing finer
Than one year at home, then three in China.
Cigar in mouth, with coffee-pot nearby,
Sir Arthur lectures in a poet's tie.
Blue wool and tweed hide F. L.'s manly heart:
He has the poet's hat – if not his art.
Rylands abounds in scintillating wit;
The girls in raptures at his lectures sit.
Dear Dr Tillyard, full of common sense,
Is obvious to all, however dense.
These and their like, from their own subjects fell
Into this Faculty, this English Hell.

[From a student verse-satire by J. M. MacNaughton in The Granta, 25 January 1939, p. 195]

- The Athenian Empire and the Great Illusion (1914)
- The Hope Vases: A Catalogue and a Discussion of the Hope Collection of Greek Vases with an Introduction on the History of the Collection and on Late Attic and South Italian Vases (1923)
- Lamb's Criticism. A Selection from the Literary Criticism of Charles Lamb (1923)
- Milton: Private Correspondence and Academic Exercises (1932) with Phyllis B. Tillyard
- The Poetry of Sir Thomas Wyatt: A Selection and a Study (1929)
- Shakespeare's Last Plays (1938)
- The Personal Heresy: A Controversy with C. S. Lewis (1939)
- The Elizabethan World Picture (Chatto & Windus 1943, Penguin 1963)
- Shakespeare's History Plays (1944)
- Milton (1946)
- The Miltonic Setting: Past and Present (1947)
- Poetry and Its Background: Illustrated by Five Poems 1470–1870 (1948)
- Shakespeare's Problem Plays (1949)
- Studies in Milton (1951)
- The English Renaissance, Fact or Fiction? (1952)
- The English Epic and Its Background (1954)
- The Metaphysicals and Milton (1956)
- The Nature of Comedy and Shakespeare (1958)
- The Epic Strain in the English Novel (1958)
- Poetry Direct and Oblique (1959)
- The Muse Unchained: An Intimate Account of the Revolution in English Studies at Cambridge (1958)
- Myth and the English Mind (originally Some Mythical Elements in English Literature) The Clark Lectures (1959–60)
- Essays Literary & Educational (1962)
- Shakespeare's Early Comedies (1965)
- Comus & Some Shorter Poems of Milton with Phyllis B. Tillyard (1967)

== See also ==
- English Renaissance
- Allegory in Renaissance literature
- The Wars of the Roses

== Notes ==
Academic offices
| Preceded by Wynfrid Laurence Henry Duckworth | Master of Jesus College, Cambridge; 1945–1959 | Succeeded by Sir Denys Page |
