= Olive Mudie-Cooke =

British war artist (1890–1925)

- Born: 1890; London
- Died: 1925 (aged 34–35); France
- Education: St John's Wood Art School; Goldsmiths College
- Known for: Painting

Olive Mudie-Cooke (1890 – 11 September 1925) was an English artist who is best known for the paintings she created during the First World War. Mudie-Cooke served as an ambulance driver in both France and Italy during the conflict and these experiences were reflected in her artwork.

== Life and work ==
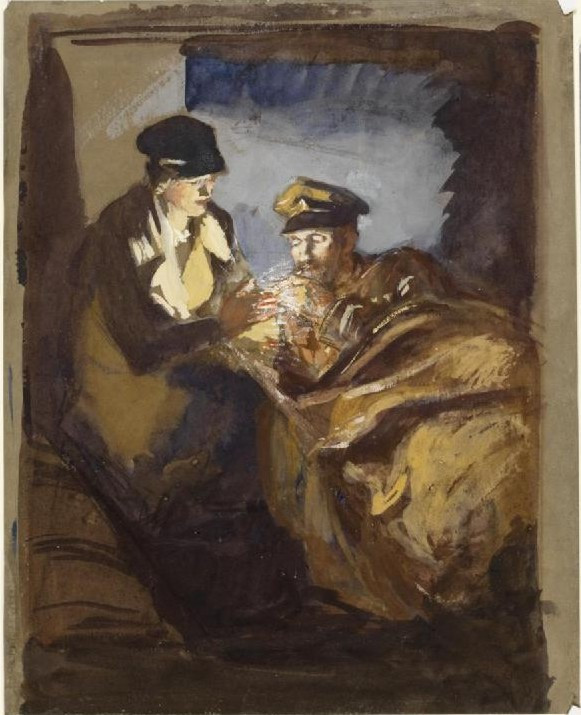
In an Ambulance: a VAD lighting a cigarette for a patient (Art.IWM ART 3051), painted between 1916 and 1918

Mudie-Cooke was born in west London, the younger of two daughters to Henry Cooke, a carpet merchant, and Beatrice Mudie. She studied art at St John's Wood Art School and at Goldsmiths College. She also worked in Venice for a brief period. In January 1916 Mudie-Cooke and her elder sister Phyllis, who had studied archaeology, went to France as volunteer members of the First Aid Nursing Yeomanry, FANY. Whilst driving ambulances for FANY, and later for a Voluntary Aid Detachment unit, in France between 1916 and 1918, Mudie-Cooke began to sketch and paint the scenes she saw around her, both among her fellow ambulance drivers and the medical staff they were working with. In particular her watercolours and chalk drawings often focused on wounded troops being evacuated, and the logistics of evacuation such as ambulance trains waiting in sidings. As well as the Western Front Mudie-Cooke also served as an ambulance driver in Italy during the war. Mudie-Cooke was fluent in French, Italian and German and so sometimes worked as an interpreter for the Red Cross.

In 1919 Mudie-Cooke came to the attention of the Women's Work Sub-Committee of the newly formed Imperial War Museum which acquired a number of her paintings for its fledgling collection. This purchase included her most famous picture, In an Ambulance:a VAD lighting a cigarette for a patient. In 1920 the British Red Cross commissioned her to return to France to record the activities of the Voluntary Aid Detachment units who were still providing care and relief there. Her paintings from this visit include examples of war damage, the shattered landscapes of the former battlefields and women tending graves in a cemetery. Mudie-Cooke worked mostly in watercolours, painting in a fluid style but often with a somewhat murky palette of colours.

Mudie-Cooke returned to Newlyn in Cornwall and continued working as an artist and held an exhibition of her work in 1921 at the Cambridge University Architectural Society. From 1920 onwards, Mudie-Cooke travelled extensively throughout Europe and Africa, most notably to South Africa where she held an exhibition of her work in 1923. She returned to England for a short period before going to France in 1925 where she took her life. An exhibition of her work was held at the Beaux-Arts Gallery the next year and some years later her sister Phyllis donated more of her works to the Imperial War Museum.
