= Lydart =

Coordinates: 51.779510°N 2.726970°W

- Hamlet
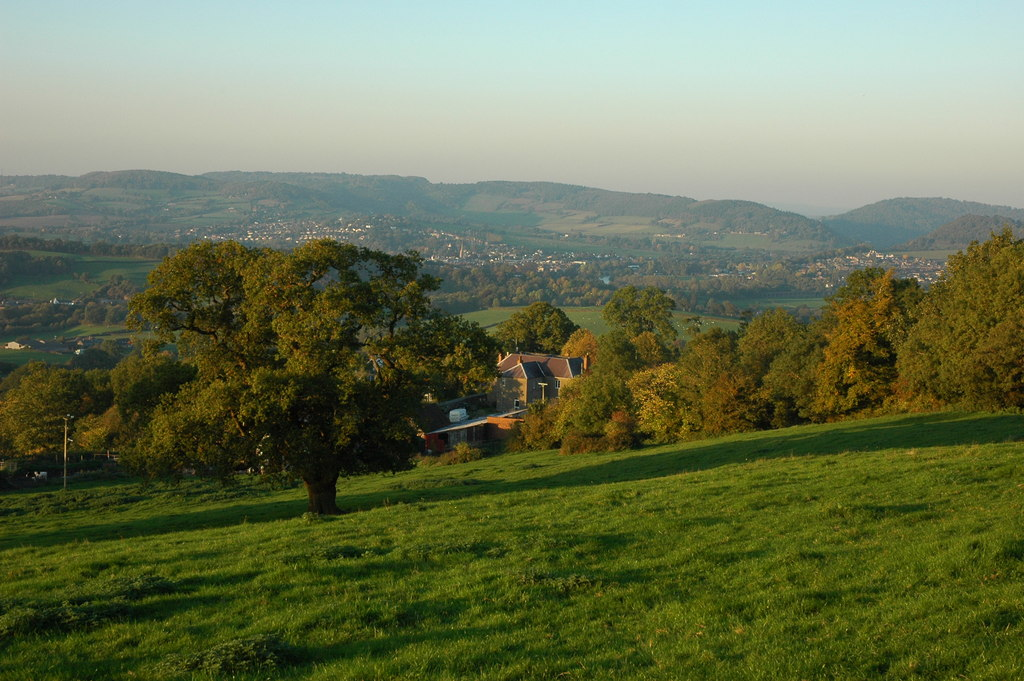
- View over New House Farm towards Monmouth

- Location within Monmouthshire
- OS grid reference: SO500092
- Principal area: Monmouthshire
- Preserved county: Gwent
- Country: Wales
- Sovereign state: United Kingdom
- Post town: MONMOUTH
- Postcode district: NP25
- Dialling code: 01600
- Police: Gwent
- Fire: South Wales
- Ambulance: Welsh
- UK Parliament: Monmouth

Lydart is a dispersed hamlet within the community of Mitchel Troy, Monmouthshire, Wales. It is located about 3 miles (4.8 km) south-west of Monmouth, 3 miles (4.8 km) north of Trellech, and 1 mile (1.6 km) south-east of Mitchel Troy village, on the top of an escarpment which slopes steeply down to the valley of the River Trothy. The B4293 road passes through the area.

== Lydart House and Estate ==
Lydart House is described as a "handsomely proportioned" eighteenth-century house, of six bays and two storeys. The Royal Commission on the Ancient and Historical Monuments of Wales (RCAHMW) noted the dramatic hipped roof. The nearby Lydart Farmhouse is a fortified manor house largely constructed in the late fifteenth or early sixteenth century, though parts of the house date to the twelfth century. The house underwent further expansion in the late eighteenth century, after the Lydart estate saw a significant influx of wealth from the wars with France. The RCAHMW suggests that dendrochronology indicates a construction date of the early 1700s. The house's chapel is designated as a site of historical interest by CADW due to its rare fleur-de-lys decorative plasterwork and hidden staircase, which may indicate early ecclesiastical use. Both Lydart House and Lydart Farm are Grade II listed buildings.

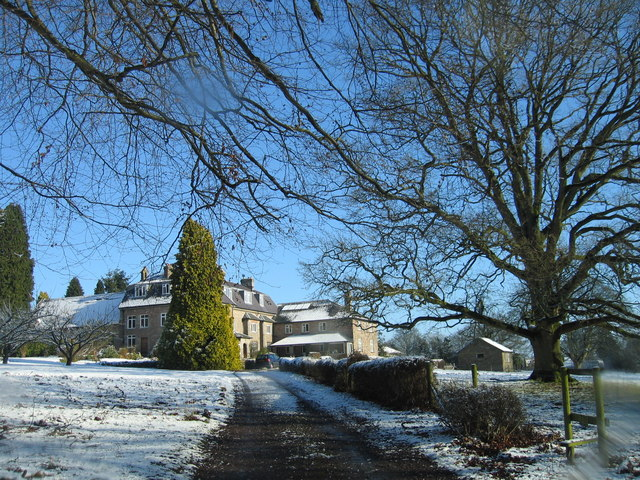
The Society of the Sacred Cross convent at Ty Mawr

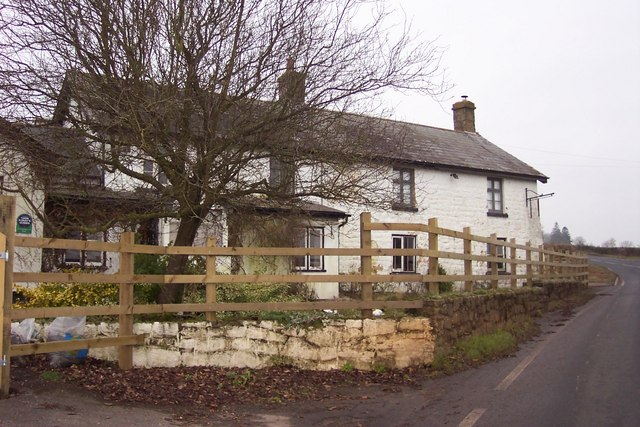
The former Gockett Inn

== Caer Llan ==
Caer Llan, 1 mile (1.6 km) to the south of Lydart House, is a former country house, thought to have been built about 1800 but much extended in various stages since that time. After being used briefly as a boarding school, it began to be used as a field studies centre in 1971. It is now also used as a conference centre and events venue, and provides some accommodation. Ancient woodland to the south east of the centre is a Site of Special Scientific Interest (SSSI).

== Ty Mawr ==
Ty Mawr is a convent run by the Society of the Sacred Cross in a secluded location at Lydart. The community was established at Ty Mawr in 1923, and today consists of about ten professed sisters, with several oblates and associates.

== Other buildings and structures ==
The Gockett Inn was a public house located on the B4293 road. It is known to have operated since at least the 17th century and to have been used by drovers, but closed down around 2003 and is now a private house.

A boundary stone at Five Trees marks the point at which the boundaries of the ancient parishes of Cwmcarvan, Mitchel Troy, Penallt and Trellech meet. Four trees were planted to mark the junction before 1800, and a fifth was placed in the middle as the central point. The site was restored in 1982/83, with the assistance of young persons employed under the Youth Training Scheme.

High Glanau, a house and garden built in 1922/23 for the architectural writer and garden designer Henry Avray Tipping, is located just south of Lydart, within the community of Cwmcarvan.
