= H. J. W. Tillyard =

British classicist, Byzantinist and musicologist (1881–1968)

- Born: Henry Julius Wetenhall Tillyard; 18 November 1881; Cambridge, Cambridgeshire, England
- Died: 2 January 1968 (aged 86); Herts and Essex Hospital, Bishop's Stortford, Hertfordshire, England
- Spouse: Mina Kaufmann (m. 1913)
- Children: 2
- Relatives: Aelfrida Tillyard (sister); E. M. W. Tillyard (brother); Robert John Tillyard (cousin); Stella Tillyard (great-niece)

Academic background
- Education: Gonville and Caius College, Cambridge, 1904; British School of Archaeology at Athens, 1907

Henry Julius Wetenhall Tillyard (18 November 1881 – 2 January 1968), known as H. J. W. Tillyard, was a British classicist, Byzantinist and musicologist, specialising in Byzantine music.

== Early life and education ==
Tillyard was born on 18 November 1881 in Cambridge to Alfred Isaac Tillyard (1852–1929), the proprietor and editor of the Cambridge Independent Press, and Catharine Sarah Tillyard (née Wetenhall; 1852–1932), a proponent of higher education for women. The eldest of four siblings, Tillyard was the brother of the writer and mystic Aelfrida Tillyard and classical and literary scholar E. M. W. Tillyard. Tillyard was the cousin of the entomologist Robert John Tillyard, and the great-aunt of the author and historian Stella Tillyard.

Educated at Tonbridge School, Tillyard later studied the Classical Tripos at Gonville and Caius College, Cambridge. Graduating in 1904, Tillyard continued his studies at the British School of Archaeology at Athens where he became interested in liturgical music of the Byzantine Empire. Studying under J.T. Sakellarides and Ioannis Sakellarides, the then precentor of Saint Irene church, Tillyard learnt the Chrysanthine system of training and reform, and the New Method of Byzantine notation.

== Career ==
From 1908 to 1917, Tillyard worked as a lecturer in Greek at the University of Edinburgh. Tillyard briefly taught in Tonbridge, and received his PhD in 1918 with a dissertation on Byzantine music. From 1919 to 1921, Tillyard was a professor of classics in Johannesburg and upon returning to Britain worked as a Russian language professor at the University of Birmingham. From 1926 to 1946, Tillyard was a professor of Greek at University College Cardiff. Returning to the Union of South Africa, Tillyard was a classics lecturer at Rhodes University from 1946 to 1949.

== Personal life ==
On 8 April 1913, Tillyard married Wilhelmina "Mina" Kaufmann (1887–1976) with whom he adopted two children.

Tillyard died on 2 January 1968 at Herts and Essex Hospital in Bishop's Stortford, aged 86. (Note: Also cited as Saffron Walden.)

== Bibliography ==
- Semeonoff, A. E.; Tillyard, H. J. W., eds. (1917). Russian Poetry Reader. London; New York City: Kegan Paul, Trench, Trübner & Co; E. P. Dutton & Co.
- Tillyard, H. J. W. (1923). Byzantine Music and Hymnography. London: Faith Press.
