= Tillard =

Tillard is an English surname. Notable people with the surname include:

- Charles Tillard (1851–1944), English cricketer
- Conrad Tillard (born 1964), American Baptist minister, radio host, author, activist, and politician
- Elliot Tillard (1880–1967), English first-class cricketer
- James Tillard, first person to land on Sabrina Island in the Azores
- John Tillard (1924–2019), former English cricketer
- Violet Tillard (1874−1922), English suffragette, nurse and pacifist
