= Big Innings: The Best of The Outfield =

Big Innings: The Best of the Outfield

Greatest hits album by the Outfield
- Released: 3 September 1996
- Genre: Pop rock
- Length: 59:48
- Label: Sony
- Producers: William Wittman, John Spinks, David Kahne

The Outfield chronology
Playing the Field (1992)	Big Innings: The Best of the Outfield (1996)	It Ain't Over... (1998)

Professional ratings
Review scores
Source	Rating
AllMusic	4/5 stars

Big Innings: The Best of the Outfield is the second greatest hits collection by British pop rock band the Outfield, featuring tracks from various albums released from 1985 onwards, together with some unreleased material.

AllMusic's review says "Big Innings is a more-than-sufficient hits package."

== Track listing ==
All tracks are written by John Spinks.

Big Innings track listing
No.	Title	Original album	Length
1.	"Voices of Babylon"	Voices of Babylon (1989)	3:29
2.	"For You"	Diamond Days (1990)	4:23
3.	"Your Love"	Play Deep (1985)	3:37
4.	"It Should Have Been Me"	Previously unreleased	3:17
5.	"Say It Isn't So"	Play Deep	3:43
6.	"Winning It All"	Rockeye (1992)	3:16
7.	"Everytime You Cry"	Play Deep	4:27
8.	"Through the Years"	Previously unreleased	3:35
9.	"The Night Ain't Over"	Voices of Babylon	4:05
10.	"Closer to Me"	Rockeye	3:14
11.	"Somewhere in America '89""	B-side on "My Paradise" single	3:45
12.	"My Paradise"	Voices of Babylon	3:35
13.	"All the Love"	Play Deep	3:29
14.	"Alone with You"	Previously unreleased acoustic version	3:08
15.	"Since You've Been Gone"	Bangin' (1987)	4:35
16.	"One Hot Country"	From the soundtrack If Looks Could Kill (1991)	4:10
Total length:			59:48
