= Playing the Field (The Outfield album) =

Compilation album by the Outfield
- Released: 24 August 1992
- Recorded: 1985–1992
- Genre: Pop rock
- Length: 39:35
- Label: Sony Music Special Products
- Producer: Various

The Outfield chronology
Rockeye (1992)	Playing the Field (1992)	Big Innings (1996)

Playing the Field is the first greatest hits album by British pop rock band the Outfield. Released in 1992, the album features much of the band's popular material released over the previous decade. It was rated four stars by AllMusic.

== Track listing ==
All songs written by John Spinks.

1. "Your Love"
2. "Since You've Been Gone"
3. "All the Love in the World"
4. "Say It Isn't So"
5. "Everytime You Cry"
6. "Reach Out"
7. "Somewhere in America"
8. "Voices of Babylon"
9. "No Surrender"
10. "My Paradise"

== Personnel ==
- Tony T Lewis - vocals, bass
- John Frederick Spinks - guitar, keyboard, songwriter
- Alan Jackman - drums
