= List of number-one hits of 1987 (Mexico) =

This is a list of the songs that reached number one in Mexico in 1987, according to the Notitas Musicales magazine with data provided by Radio Mil(which also provided charts for Billboard's "Hits of the World" between 1969 and 1981).

Notitas Musicales was a bi-weekly magazine that published two record charts:

- "Canciones que México canta" ("Songs that Mexico sings"), which listed the Top 10 most popular Spanish-language songs in Mexico, and
- "Hit Parade", which was a Top 10 of the most popular songs in Mexico that were in languages other than Spanish.

== Chart history ==
Issue Date	Spanish-language songs		Songs in other languages		Ref.
Issue Date	Song	Artist(s)	Song	Artist(s)	Ref.
1 January	"Tímido"	Flans	"Dancing on the Ceiling"	Lionel Richie	
15 January	"Tímido"	Flans	"All the Love in the World"	The Outfield	
1 February	"Tímido"	Flans	"All the Love in the World"	The Outfield	
15 February	"De mí enamórate"	Daniela Romo	"All the Love in the World"	The Outfield	
1 March	"Ay, qué pesado"	Mecano	"All the Love in the World"	The Outfield	
15 March	"Doce rosas"	Lorenzo Antonio	"All the Love in the World"	The Outfield	
1 April	"Doce rosas"	Lorenzo Antonio	"Papa Don't Preach"	Madonna	
15 April	"Doce rosas"	Lorenzo Antonio	"Papa Don't Preach"	Madonna	
1 May	"Doce rosas"	Lorenzo Antonio	"All the Love in the World"	The Outfield	
15 May	"Doce rosas"	Lorenzo Antonio	"All the Love in the World"	The Outfield	
1 June	"Cruz de navajas"	Mecano	"All the Love in the World"	The Outfield	
15 June	"Cruz de navajas"	Mecano	"All the Love in the World"	The Outfield	
1 July	"Besos de ceniza"	Timbiriche	"All the Love in the World"	The Outfield	
15 July	"Besos de ceniza"	Timbiriche	"Walk Like an Egyptian"	The Bangles	
1 August	"Besos de ceniza"	Timbiriche	"Nothing's Gonna Stop Us Now"	Starship	
15 August	"Ahora te puedes marchar"	Luis Miguel	"Nothing's Gonna Stop Us Now"	Starship	
1 September	"Ahora te puedes marchar"	Luis Miguel	"Nothing's Gonna Stop Us Now"	Starship	
15 September	"Ahora te puedes marchar"	Luis Miguel	"La Isla Bonita"	Madonna	
1 October	"Ahora te puedes marchar"	Luis Miguel	"Who's That Girl?"	Madonna	
15 October	"Ahora te puedes marchar"	Luis Miguel	"La Bamba" (Note: Despite this song being in Spanish, it was listed under the "Hit Parade" chart, perhaps because Los Lobos was a group based in the U.S. and not in a Spanish-speaking country.)	Los Lobos	
1 November	"Ahora te puedes marchar"	Luis Miguel	"Bad"	Michael Jackson	
15 November	"Ahora te puedes marchar"	Luis Miguel	"Bad"	Michael Jackson	
1 December	"Ahora te puedes marchar"	Luis Miguel	"Bad"	Michael Jackson	
15 December	"Ahora te puedes marchar"	Luis Miguel	"Bad"	Michael Jackson	

== See also ==
- 1987 in music

== Sources ==
- Print editions of the Notitas Musicales magazine.
