= Healthcare in Essex =

Medicine in Essex, England

Healthcare in Essex is now the responsibility of Integrated Care Systems (ICSs for short). ICSs are partnerships between the organisations that meet health and care needs across an area, to coordinate services and to plan in a way that improves population health and reduces inequalities between different groups.

== History ==
From 1947 to 1965 NHS services in Essex were managed by the East Anglian for Saffron Walden and North-East Metropolitan (the rest of the county) regional hospital boards. In 1974 the boards were abolished and replaced by regional health authorities. Essex came under the North East Thames RHA. Regions were reorganised in 1996 and Essex came under the North Thames Regional Health Authority. There were two area health authorities from 1974 until 1982: Barking and Havering and Essex. There were six district health authorities: Barking, Havering and Brentwood; Basildon and Thurrock; Mid Essex; North East Essex; Southend; and West Essex. in 1993 these were reorganised into North Essex and South Essex. Regional Health Authorities were reorganised and renamed strategic health authorities in 2002. Essex was under the Essex SHA. In 2006 regions were again reorganised and Essex came under NHS East of England until that was abolished in 2013. There were six primary care trusts for the area: South East Essex; South West Essex; North Essex; West Essex; North East Essex; and Mid-Essex PCT. Look up St Helena Hospice.

== Sustainability and transformation plans ==
Suffolk and North East Essex formed a sustainability and transformation plan area in March 2016 with Nick Hulme, the Chief Executive of Ipswich Hospital NHS Trust, as its leader. Hertfordshire and West Essex formed an STP with Beverley Flowers, the Accountable Officer of East and North Hertfordshire Clinical Commissioning Group as its leader, and Mid and South Essex under the leadership of Dr Anita Donley the independent chair of the Mid and South Essex Success Regime.

There are two plans for the county, one for Hertfordshire and West Essex and one for Mid and South Essex. Both claim that they will reduce the use of the hospital sector and increase the use of community and primary care sector and reduce a projected 2020/21 deficit which totals £1,180 million. Neither give any clear account of how the problems with their local hospitals are to be tackled.

Ipswich and East Suffolk, West Suffolk and North East Essex CCGs propose to merge as part of local plans to establish an integrated care system.

Hertfordshire and West Essex is to become a shadow integrated care system, covering one and a half million people with effect from April 2020.

== Commissioning ==
Castle Point and Rochford, Southend and Thurrock clinical commissioning groups were instructed by NHS England to pool functions and create a single plan in April 2017. Mid Essex, and Basildon and Brentwood CCGs are to join them in a joint committee which must produce a joint commissioning plan to be approved in advance by NHS England.

=== Service restrictions ===
In 2015 the spending allocation received by Mid-Essex Clinical Commissioning Group, was £81 less per head of population than the national average.

In September a survey by the Health Service Journal showed that 34 of 188 CCGs who responded to their survey had restricted access to some services. Restrictions were usually introduced by a number of CCGs acting together across an area. Essex CCGs were proposing restricted access to specialist fertility services, and non-urgent elective surgery for patients who were obese or smoked.

Basildon and Brentwood CCG decided to limit GP referrals for vasectomy in April 2015. The number of vasectomies each practice is permitted to refer in 2015/16 ranges from one to 11 per practice based on their list size. The decision was criticised by Dr Richard Vautrey of the British Medical Association who said: ‘This is a ridiculous short-term decision that could have huge long-term emotional and financial consequences to both families in the area that the CCG serves and to the wider NHS as other services have to pick up the pieces. For the sake of saving a few pounds the CCG is taking the risk of a rise in unwanted pregnancies and all that means for individuals and families and they should seriously consider reversing this decision.’

North East Essex CCG decided in May 2015 to stop providing IVF, vasectomies or female sterilisation to people other than those with complex health needs, and to stop prescribing gluten-free food to most patients. People needing non-urgent elective surgery who smoke will be referred to stop-smoking services and overweight patients will be encouraged to lose weight before their operation and failure to attend the programmes “may have an impact on whether individuals could undergo their procedure”. It also plan to stop most IVF treatment. These decisions are intended to save £14 million a year.

Mid Essex CCG proposed to stop funding hearing aids for people with mild hearing loss, prescriptions for gluten-free food, vasectomies and female sterilisation and possibly all direct GP-assessed physiotherapy in December 2015.

=== Data extraction ===
In June 2015 Southend CCG announced plans to start extracting data from GP records to identify patients with complex care needs though their NHS number, age and post code, with the aim of reviewing their care. It will be linked to hospital records including the number of appointments with the GP or practice nurse, prescribed medications, and unplanned admissions for individual patients. Patients will not be given the opportunity to opt out of this exercise. The CCG says ‘Quite often the reason an individual’s care is high cost is because they are receiving multiple services but all delivered separately. By reviewing data across the system we will be better placed to see opportunities to join up health and social care services and provide patients with a single package of care.’

== Primary care ==
There are 35 GP practices in Thurrock, 41 in Southend, 40 in West Essex, 43 in North East Essex, 49 in Mid Essex, 41 in Ipswich and East Suffolk and 44 in Basildon and Brentwood. 20 GPs were to be recruited from Portugal, Spain, Romania, Czech Republic and Slovakia in 2017 as part of the GP Forward View.

Out-of-hours services are provided by Nestor Primecare Services Limited in Mid Essex, Care UK in North East Essex and Southend, Partnership of East London Co-operatives (PELC) Limited in West Essex, and the South Essex Emergency Doctors Service in Thurrock and Basildon.

== Acute care ==
Mid Essex Hospital Services NHS Trust and Princess Alexandra Hospital NHS Trust provide acute services in the county. In May 2015 the acute hospitals in Essex were about together £150m in deficit, and there were a series of lapses in patient safety at Broomfield Hospital. The county was one of three proposed for the new “success regime” by Simon Stevens in June 2015 in which NHS England will work in partnership with Monitor and the NHS Trust Development Authority to tackle in the local health economy.

Clare Panniker, the Chief Executive at Basildon is leading the success regime initiative, which aimed to tackle a deficit in Mid and south Essex of £216 million by 2018-19. In 2015, services were to be reconfigured at Basildon and Thurrock University Hospitals, Southend University Hospital, and Mid Essex Hospital. There were promises that none of the hospitals will close, and they would be managed together.

The clinical commissioning group joint committee for mid and south Essex in November 2019 reported that local hospitals were “now working” to a 40-week referral to treatment target, more than twice the time specified in the NHS Constitution, in an effort to reduce the risk of 52-week breaches.

== Mental health ==
North Essex Partnership University NHS Foundation Trust and South Essex Partnership University NHS Foundation Trust

== Community services ==
Palliative care is provided by Farleigh Hospice, St Helena Hospice in Colchester, St Luke's Hospice in Basildon, The J's Hospice in Great Baddow, St Clare Hospice in Hastingwood, and Fair Havens Hospice, Westcliff-on-Sea which also runs Little Havens Hospice in Thundersley.

Community services including community nursing, ophthalmology, audiology and cardiology were provided by Anglian Community Enterprises, a community interest company, from 2015 on a seven year contract, but in May 2020 North East Essex Clinical Commissioning Group and Essex County Council decided to terminate it and make new arrangements. North East Essex Integrated Community Services was established as an alliance of East Suffolk and North Essex NHS Foundation Trust, GP Primary Choice, Essex Partnership University NHS Foundation Trust and Virgin Care. It was given a 10-year contract, worth £440 million for community nursing and intermediate care, stroke rehabilitation and community beds in Colchester and Tendring from July 2021.

== HealthWatch ==
Healthwatch is an organisation set up under the Health and Social Care Act 2012 to act as a voice for patients.

== See also ==
- Category:Health in Essex
- Healthcare in the United Kingdom
