= Replay (The Outfield album) =

Studio album by the Outfield
- Released: 28 June 2011
- Recorded: 2009–2010
- Genre: Pop rock; power pop
- Length: 50:06
- Label: Protocol Entertainment
- Producer: John Spinks (also exec.); The Outfield; Brent Bitner

The Outfield chronology
Any Time Now (2006)	Replay (2011)

Singles from Replay
- 1. "California Sun" Released: 4 May 2011; 2. "A Long, Long Time Ago" Released: 28 June 2011

Replay is the tenth and final studio album by the English rock band the Outfield, released on 28 June 2011. This was the last album that the band released before songwriter and guitarist John Spinks died from liver cancer. The lead single, "California Sun", was a regional number one AOR chart hit. A limited advanced release of the band's second single, "A Long, Long Time Ago", reached number one on Worldwide FM ClassX Radio's AOR chart in the second week of August 2011. This album also marks the return of founding drummer Alan Jackman to the band. The album would be recorded at Abbey Road Studios.

== Track listing ==
All tracks written by John Spinks.

1. "Aladdin's Cave" – 4:32
2. "California Sun" – 4:01
3. "A Long, Long Time Ago" – 4:25
4. "In Your Company" – 3:33
5. "Who Would You Be?" – 3:10
6. "Shake Your Thing" – 4:39
7. "New York City" – 4:11
8. "Call It Out" – 3:41
9. "Process" – 3:52
10. "Wonderland" – 5:26
11. "Disraeli Years" – 4:17
12. "Sandman" – 4:26

Non-album and online bonus tracks

1. "Malibu Beach" (B-Side to California Sun Single) – 4:05
2. "A Little Piece of Luck" (Charity Single) – 4:34

== Personnel ==
=== The Outfield ===
- Tony Lewis – bass guitar, vocals
- John Spinks – guitars, vocals
- Alan Jackman – drums, percussion

=== Production ===
- Produced by John Spinks, The Outfield, Brent Bitner
- Executive producer – John Spinks
