= Live in Brazil (The Outfield album) =

Live album by the Outfield
- Released: March 2001
- Recorded: January 2001
- Genre: Pop rock

The Outfield chronology
Extra Innings (1999)	Live in Brazil (2001)	The Outfield Live (2005)

Live In Brazil is the first live album by the British rock band the Outfield, released in 2001. It was released exclusively via the band's official website, and labelled as an 'Official Bootleg'. The live performance features many of the band's popular hits from throughout their career.

== Track listing ==
1. "Intro"
2. "Tiny Lights"
3. "61 Seconds"
4. "Certain Kind Of Love"
5. "Closer To Me"
6. "Say It Isn't So"
7. "All The Love"
8. "Mystery Man"
9. "Since You've Been Gone"
10. "For You"
11. "My Paradise"
12. "I Don't Need Her"
13. "Your Love"

== Personnel ==
- Tony Lewis - vocals, bass
- John Spinks - guitar, keyboard, vocals
- Simon Dawson - drums
