= St Margaret's Hospital, Epping =

St. Margaret's Hospital
- Princess Alexandra Hospital NHS Trust
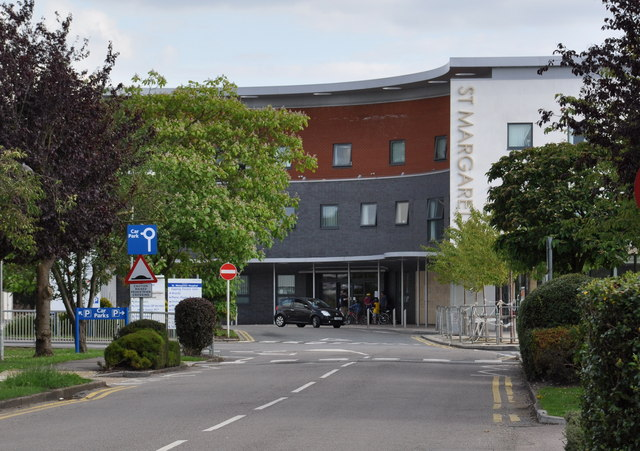
- St. Margaret's Hospital

- Shown in Essex

Geography
- Location: Epping, Essex, England, United Kingdom
- Coordinates: 51.7050°N 0.1238°E

Organisation
- Care system: National Health Service
- Type: District general
- Affiliated university: None
- Patron: None

Links
- Lists: Hospitals in England

St Margaret's Hospital is a hospital in Epping, Essex. It is managed by the Princess Alexandra Hospital NHS Trust.

== History ==
The hospital has its origins in the Epping Union Workhouse Infirmary built in 1846. New infirmary buildings were constructed in 1876, in the 1880s and again in 1911. The site became the Epping Institution in 1930 and St. Margaret's Hospital in 1938.

On 22 March 1945 the hospital was hit by a German V-2 rocket, which destroyed the water tower, flooding nearby houses. 7 men were killed. Some houses, the elderly unit and the laundry block at the hospital and a single storey timber built casual ward were destroyed. The hospital joined the National Health Service in 1948 and the workhouse building itself was demolished in 2001.

== See also ==
- Healthcare in Essex
- List of hospitals in England
