= Reg Webb =

English musician (1947–2018)

- Born: Reginald William Webb; 17 May 1947; Chelmsford, Essex, England
- Died: 28 January 2018 (aged 70) Northeast Essex, England
- Genres: Jazz; rock; pop rock; new wave
- Occupations: Musician; singer; songwriter
- Instruments: Keyboards; piano; vocals; drums; guitar
- Years active: 1961–2018

Reginald William "Reg" Webb (17 May 1947 – 28 January 2018) was an English musician, multi-instrumentalist, and singer-songwriter. He predominantly played keyboards and was a vocalist.

He fronted the Reg Webb Trio (later Reg Webb Fusion), the Reg Webb Band, James Webley Trio (later James Webley Fusion), Fusion, and Reg and the Readers.

== Early life ==
Webb was born on 17 May 1947 in Chelmsford, Essex, England. He became blind at the age of 13 months after being diagnosed with bi-lateral retinoblastoma, which resulted in surgery to remove both of his eyes. His father was also blind from the same condition.

Webb credited his early interest in music to his father and educational trends for blind students during his childhood. His father encouraged Webb to pursue classical piano. He claimed to have never received formal lessons in jazz music. Webb attended Worcester College for the Blind, now New College Worcester, with fellow musician Pete Jacobsen. Webb played drums in school and named Tony Williams as his main influence. While still a student, he formed a band called the W Brothers with fellow musician Andy Woods and future broadcast journalist Peter White.

His father, a factory worker, died in 1966 at age 46.

From '66 through '69, Webb earned a social science degree at the University of Birmingham. He trained as a social worker with Essex County's Mental Health Department, but disliked the bureaucracy. He became a full time musician in 1972.

== Career ==
Webb began gigging when he was around the age of 14 or 15 as a rhythm guitar player in a dance band called the Maurice Hinton Band.

He founded the Red Webb Trio and, by the late 1960s, the lineup consisted of Webb, Alan Morgan and Dave Meakin. The group's name was changed to the Reg Webb Fusion around 1970.

After signing a recording contract with EMI, Webb was assigned the stage name "James Webley," and changed his band's name to the James Webley Fusion. He disliked the name and stopped using it after parting with EMI. His debut album, entitled Lady J, fell victim to the record company's internal politics.

His band morphed into Fusion and the lineup included a young Nik Kershaw on guitar, Kenn Elson on bass, and Alan Clarke on drums. The band released the album Till I Hear from You in 1980. Fusion disbanded in 1982. Kershaw credits Webb for helping start his music career, having written, "Reg was the professor and he taught me so much.... Without him, I don’t think I would have found myself in Sarm Studios in the summer of 1983, recording my first album."

Webb worked freelance gigs and studio sessions for musicians Robin Trower, David Essex, and Andy Piercy. This led to playing keyboards for the Outfield on their 1985 debut album Play Deep, and joining the band on their first US tour. Webb is also credited on the band's 1992 album Rockeye.

In the 1990s, he toured with Lenny Kravitz, Vanessa Paradis, and Suzi Quatro.

He formed a Motown-inspired soul and pop duo called Short People with his second wife, Kate Pace. When the marriage ended, he continued with Colchester singer Laura Jepp in the early 2010s. Around the same time, Webb found session work was difficult to come by and so he "[gigged] relentlessly."

In a 2013 interview, Webb mentioned being part of a new jazz trio called the 3Bs (though not related to the jazz trio the 3B's of the 1990s), with musicians Lincoln Anderson and Andrew Dowling. The band's name came from the adjectives "blind, black and breathless."

In 2016, Webb performed at the Colchester Arts Centre Jazz Club's Relaunch Night with guitarist John Etheridge.

== Personal life and death ==
Webb moved to San Francisco after marrying an American named Heather. Difficulties in securing his permanent residency in the US led to friction in the marriage. When they divorced, he returned to the UK. Webb has a son named Paul from his first marriage.

Webb married a second time to singer Kate Pace, which lasted thirteen years before ending in divorce.

Webb died on 28 January 2018 at St Helena Hospice in Essex; he was 70. His cause of death was a pulmonary embolism, a consequence of metastatic bladder cancer.

In 2019, Steve Wright of the Colchester Arts Centre Jazz Club organized a fundraising concert in honor of Webb.
