= Any Time Now (The Outfield album) =

Studio album by the Outfield
- Released: 21 March 2006
- Recorded: 2002–2004
- Genre: Pop rock; power pop
- Label: Sidewinder Records
- Producer: John Spinks

The Outfield chronology
The Outfield Live (2005)	Any Time Now (2006)	Replay (2011)

Any Time Now is the eighth studio album by British rock band the Outfield. Two versions of this album were released: one sold exclusively through the band's Web site and Tower Records, and the other issued by Sidewinder Records and distributed to music retail stores everywhere. The latter version included eight tracks from the Exclusive Web Edition plus four new songs— "Wasted", "Long Walk Back (From Nowhere)", "I Can't Wait", and "Peace." The album's only single, "It's All About Love", was initially released as an EP in 2003 and used to heavily promote the album prior to its release; yet, the track received only limited airplay in a few select markets and in cities the band played while on tour. The Exclusive Web Edition includes new material recorded from 2002 to 2004 as well as alternate mixes of some previously released material included as bonus tracks. The most notable bonus track was "Tiny Lights (New Millennium Mix)," which was a re-recorded studio version of a seminal fan favorite that was first released as the B-side to "Everytime You Cry" in 1986. With 17 tracks, the original version of "Any Time Now" has become a highly sought-after collector's item and is now very difficult to find.

== Track listings ==
=== 2006 Sidewinder version ===
1. "No Fear"
2. "Wasted"
3. "This Love Affair"
4. "Long Walk Back (From Nowhere)"
5. "I Can't Wait"
6. "It's All About Love"
7. "There She Goes"
8. "The Sound Of Love"
9. "Give it All You Got"
10. "Photograph"
11. "Rainbow's End"
12. "Peace"

=== 2004 Limited Web Edition ===
1. "This Love Affair"
2. "Give it All You Got"
3. "It's All About Love"
4. "Slow Motion (Original Mix)" *
5. "There She Goes"
6. "The Sound Of Love"
7. "Heaven's Little Angel (Groove Mix)" *
8. "No Fear"
9. "To Be With You"
10. "Seven Days"
11. "My Only Friend"
12. "Photograph"
13. "Same Old Story"
14. "Two Hearts"
15. "Broken Heart"
16. "Tiny Lights (New Millennium Mix)" *
17. "Rainbow's End"
- Marked as bonus tracks

== Personnel ==
- Tony Lewis - vocals, bass
- John Spinks - guitar, keyboards, vocals

Additional personnel

- Jeffery Gish - drums
