= Extra innings (disambiguation) =

Extra innings refers to the playing of additional innings in baseball or softball in the event of a tie.

Extra innings may also refer to:

- Extra Innings (album), by The Outfield
- "Extra Innings" (Frankie Drake Mysteries), a 2018 television episode
- "Extra Innings" (The Twilight Zone), a 1988 television episode
- Extra Innings (video game), a game for the Super NES
- MLB Extra Innings, a Major League Baseball TV subscription package
- Extraaa Innings T20, a cricket telecast during the Indian Premier League
