= Suicide of Alice Figueiredo =

2015 suicide

Alice Figueiredo was a 22-year-old woman who died by suicide at Goodmayes Hospital, a secure mental health hospital in London on 7 July 2015.

== Background ==
Figueiredo was first admitted to the Hepworth Ward in May 2012, diagnosed with a non-specific eating disorder and bipolar affective disorder. During her time on the ward, staff failed to remove plastic items from the communal toilets or keep them locked. She was re-admitted to Hepworth Ward in February 2015 after a community worker became concerned for her wellbeing. She had attempted to self harm 39 times in five months including 18 times with plastic bags.

During her admission in hospital she was also treated badly by other patients. One punched her in the face and another had goaded her into committing suicide.

== Incident ==
Figueiredo committed suicide with a plastic bag on 7 July 2015. Violet Storey had worked on the ward between 2011 and retired in 2016. She had gotten to know Figueiredo well. She described how on the night she died, her observation levels had been lowered. Storey found Figueiredo's room empty and searched the ward for her, eventually finding her in a communal toilet. She attempted to resuscitate her. Paramedics arrived and took her to another hospital where she later died.

== Investigation ==
The investigation into Figueiredo's death began in 2016 but charges were not brought until September 2023.

== Trial ==
The first corporate manslaughter trial collapsed in 2016 after a judge ruled there was no case to answer.

On 11 November 2025, after a seven-month trial, NHS ward manager Benjamin Aninakwa was sentenced at the Old Bailey to a six month suspended prison sentence and 300 hours of unpaid work and North East London NHS Foundation Trust (NELFT) was fined £565,000 over health and safety breach and £200,000 costs by Judge Richard Marks after the jury found that NELFT and Aninakwa did not do enough to prevent Figueiredo from taking her life.

NELFT was cleared of corporate manslaughter but instead was found guilty of failing to ensure health and safety of non-employees and Aninakwa was found not guilty of manslaughter by gross negligence but was found guilty of failing to take reasonable care for the health and safety of patients on the ward.

The trial included the joint-longest jury deliberation in English legal history. lasting 24 days to reach all verdicts.

== Reactions ==
Alice's mother Jane Figueiredo said that they had been treated with "dismissive contempt, belittling and playing down" their "well-founded" concerns in 2015. Alice's stepfather, Max called upon Wes Streeting to "hold these trust managers to account". Wes Streeting remarked "I'm very aware of NELFT not least because NELFT has and continues to appear in the headlines for providing really poor guality care".
