= Diamond Days (The Outfield album) =

Studio album by the Outfield
- Released: 30 October 1990
- Recorded: Wildlife Studio, Ipswich, Suffolk
- Genres: Pop rock, power pop
- Length: 35:01
- Label: MCA
- Producer: John Spinks

The Outfield chronology
Voices of Babylon (1989)	Diamond Days (1990)	Rockeye (1992)

Professional ratings
Review scores
Source	Rating
AllMusic	2/5 stars

Diamond Days is the fourth album by the British band the Outfield. The album reached No. 90 on the Billboard 200 album chart. Diamond Days was the first album the band released under the MCA record label, having previously recorded for Columbia Records. Drummer Alan Jackman left the band prior to this album's recording, so this album featured a new session drummer in Simon Dawson.

The song "For You" was released as the first single from the album, and was the band's highest charting single in four years, reaching No. 21 on the Billboard Hot 100 singles chart. It was also the band's only song to reach the Adult Contemporary chart, reaching the same No. 21 position. "Take It All" was released as the second single, but failed to chart.

== Track listing ==
All tracks by John Spinks except where noted.

1. "Take It All" – 3:47
2. "Eye to Eye" (Spinks, Tony Lewis) – 2:58
3. "For You" – 4:26
4. "John Lennon" – 3:27
5. "Magic Seed" – 3:23
6. "Unrespectable" – 2:45
7. "Burning Blue" – 3:37
8. "Raintown Boys" – 3:31
9. "One Night in Heaven" – 4:24
10. "After the Storm" – 4:43

Two additional tracks were recorded during the sessions - "It's Only Love" was released as an extra track on the CD single for "For You", while "One Hot Country" was featured on the soundtrack for the film If Looks Could Kill

== Personnel ==
=== Band members ===
- Tony Lewis – vocals, bass
- John Spinks – guitar, keyboard, lead vocals on "John Lennon"
- Simon Dawson – drums

=== Additional personnel ===
- Alvin Lee – lead guitar on "One Night in Heaven"
