= Essex Partnership University NHS Foundation Trust =

Healthcare trust in England

- Type: NHS foundation trust
- Established: 1 April 2017
- Headquarters: Runwell, Essex, England, United Kingdom
- Chair: Hattie Llewelyn-Davies
- Chief executive: Paul Scott
- Staff: 7,445 (2023/24)
- Website: eput.nhs.uk

Essex Partnership University NHS Foundation Trust (EPUT) is an NHS foundation trust which provides community health, mental health and learning disability services to approximately 1.3 million people throughout Bedfordshire, Essex, Suffolk and Luton.

== History ==
The trust was established on 1 April 2017 following the merger of South Essex Partnership University NHS Foundation Trust and North Essex Partnership University NHS Foundation Trust.

== Controversies and failures ==
The trust was fined £1.5 million after a prosecution by the Health and Safety Executive in 2021 in relation to 11 deaths between 2004 and 2015 at North Essex Partnership University Trust which failed to manage ligature risks. Later in 2021 it was rated "inadequate" by the Care Quality Commission and stopped from admitting new patients without consent from CQC after inspectors found "serious concerns" in the children and adolescent mental health services.

EPUT together with North East London NHS Foundation Trust were subject to an independent Inquiry set up by Parliament into mental health services in Essex following numerous failings of these services. The inquiry was called the Essex Mental Health Independent Inquiry and it was scheduled to publish its findings in the spring of 2023.

On 12 January 2023 the chair of the Inquiry published an update to say that, among other things, EPUT was not cooperating with the inquiry and, further, that EPUT, late in process, notified the Inquiry that there were actually 2,000 deaths of mental health patients in their care, not the 1,500 they had originally declared. The Chair of the Inquiry criticised EPUT for taking two years to come up with these additional deaths by which time the Inquiry had already sought, and in many cases taken, evidence from the families of the previously known 1,500 cases. Her update also stated her belief the Inquiry could no longer do its job effectively unless Parliament upgraded the Inquiry to a full statutory and public Inquiry which would compel EPUT employees and management to give evidence. In the summer of 2023, Parliament upgraded the Inquiry and appointed Baroness Lampard as the Chair with the Inquiry now called the Lampard Inquiry

The inquest into the death of Michelle Morton who was an inpatient at The Lakes in Colchester in 2019 found that one healthcare assistant had been attending five different incidents. Staffing levels were below those authorised by the Trust. There is also an inquest into the death of Jayden Booroff who died when he left the Linden Centre in Chelmsford, on 23 October 2020.

In October 2022, Dispatches (TV programme) broadcast a documentary after a year-long investigation which revealed that EPUT was responsible for serious failures resulting in numerous deaths and is still not keeping patients safe. Within a few days of that programme, the CQC did a flash inspection of EPUT facilities and suspended the entire Trust's CQC Good rating for all its acute wards subsequently downgrading the entire trust, including the acute wards, from Good to Requires Improvement on 12 July 2023.

== See also ==
- Healthcare in Bedfordshire
- Healthcare in Essex
- List of NHS trusts
