= NHS West Essex =

UK NHS local body concerned with the organisation of service delivery in West Essex

NHS West Essex was a NHS primary care trust (PCT) in Essex, England. Formed in October 2006 following the merger of the three previous primary care trusts – Epping Forest, Harlow and Uttlesford, it has an annual budget of £370m. It covers approximately 390 square miles (1,000 km^{2}), from Buckhurst Hill to Steeple Bumpstead with a population of about 280,000. It is responsible for improving primary care and the health of the local population and with a statutory responsibility for providing health services.

== Health Services ==
NHS West Essex also plans and commissions (purchases) health services from hospitals for its local population from primarily four local hospital Trusts:

- Princess Alexandra Hospital NHS Trust
- Cambridge University Hospitals NHS Foundation Trust (Addenbrookes Hospital)
- Mid Essex Hospital Services NHS Trust (Broomfield Hospital)
- Whipps Cross University Hospital NHS Trust.

== Community Health ==
NHS West Essex works closely with community health services, relying on the contribution that the network of community hospitals, health centres, GP practises, dentists, optometrists and pharmacists make to give the public access to a wide range of services without having to travel to hospital. Across West Essex there are: 198 GPs in 40 practices, 100 dentists in 32 practices, 87 opticians in 31 practices and 46 pharmacists (Source: NHS West Essex Annual Report 2008-2009)

== Trust Headquarters and other sites ==
The PCT headquarters was at St. Margaret's Community Hospital in Epping. Other sites include:

- Harlow Walk-in Centre
- Ongar War Memorial Hospital
- Saffron Walden Community Hospital
- St. Margaret's Community Hospital

== PCT board ==
The NHS West Essex Board comprises a chairman, Alan Tobias, and five non-executive directors who are appointed by the Secretary of State, along with the chief executive, Catherine O’Connell, and directors and local GPs. The board is responsible for the PCT's strategic direction, its business plans and monitoring process, and also to ensure public accountability and involvement.

Board members include: Alan Tobias OBE, Chairman, Catherine O’Connell, Chief Executive, Stephen King, Non-Executive Director, Jackie Sully, Non-Executive Director, John Lappin, Non-Executive Director, Qadir Bakhsh, Non-Executive Director, Michael Smith, Non-Executive Director, Dean Westcott, Director of Finance, Jenny Minihane, Director of Nursing and Modernisation, Alison Cowie, Director of Public Health
