= Kate Lampard, Baroness Lampard =

British barrister and life peer (born 1960)

The Right Honourable The Baroness Lampard CBE DL
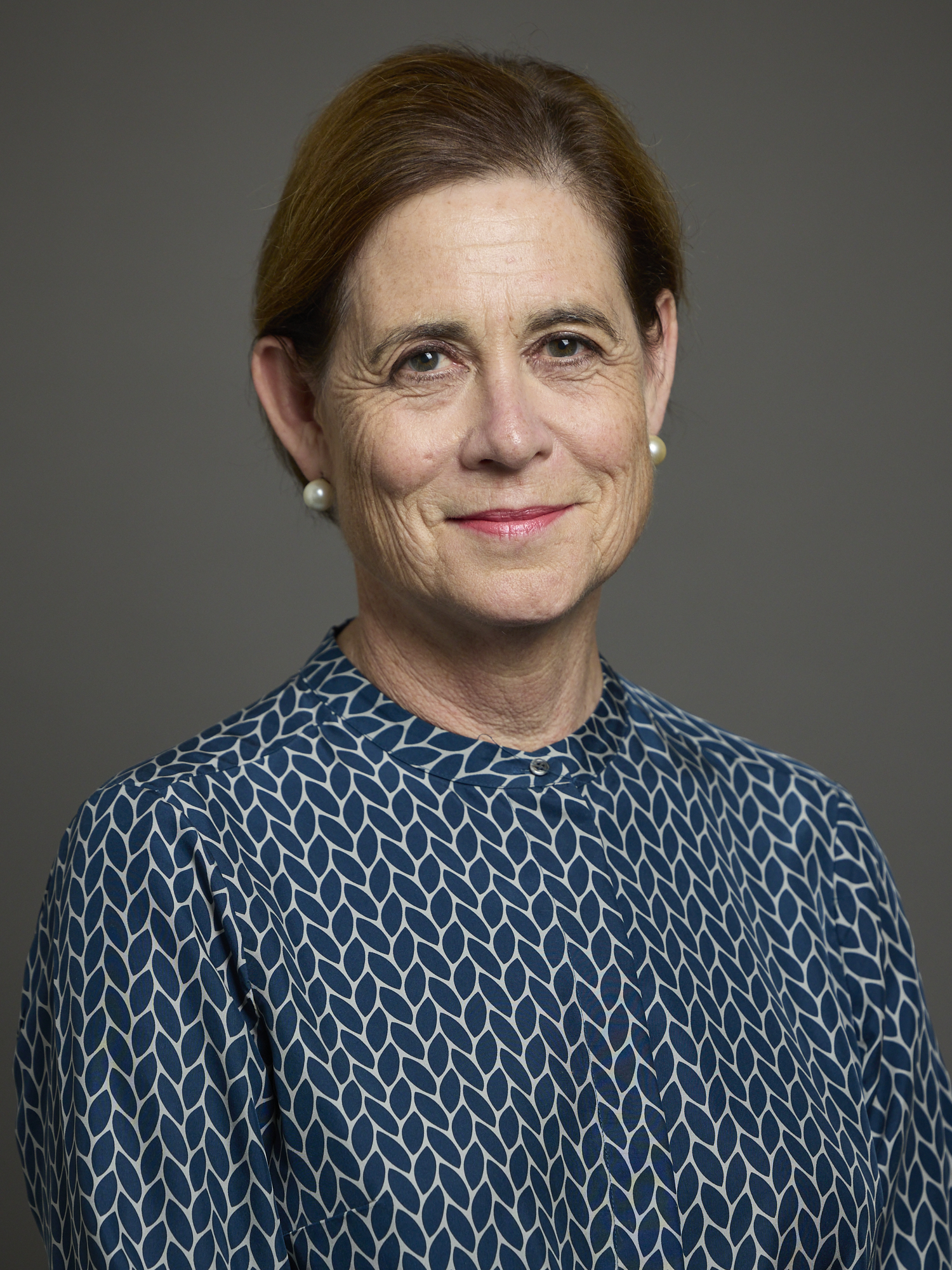
- Official portrait, 2025

Member of the House of Lords
- Lord Temporal
- Life peerage 17 November 2022

Personal details
- Born: 20 April 1960 (age 66)
- Party: Conservative (until 2024)

Kathryn Felice Lampard, Baroness Lampard, CBE, DL (born 20 April 1960) is an English former barrister who has been a member of the House of Lords as a life peer since 2022. She is best known for her investigation into the Jimmy Savile sexual abuse scandal, co-authoring the 2015 report presented to the Secretary of State for Health. In 2023 she was appointed to chair a statutory inquiry into deaths of mental health patients across National Health Service (NHS) trusts in Essex.

== Biography ==
Lampard undertook a number of senior non-executive roles within the National Health Service, including chairing SouthEast Coast Strategic Health Authority. From 2016 to July 2024 she served as chair of the trustees of the national charity GambleAware. She is also a former Deputy Chair of the Financial Ombudsman Service.

In 2012 Lampard was appointed by the Department of Health to oversee the investigations into the activities of the late broadcaster Jimmy Savile at Stoke Mandeville Hospital, Leeds General Infirmary, Broadmoor Hospital, and elsewhere within the National Health Service after allegations of sexual abuse by Savile. Her report, co-authored with Ed Marsden, was published in 2015.

In 2015 Lampard was appointed by Serco Plc to undertake an independent review of the circumstances surrounding allegations, made in a Channel 4 news report, of the mistreatment of detainees at Yarl's Wood Immigration Removal Centre. In 2017 she was appointed by G4S plc to undertake an independent review of the circumstances surrounding allegations, made in a BBC Panorama television programme, of the mistreatment of detainees at the Brook House Immigration Removal Centre.

In 2019 the Home Secretary, Sajid Javid, appointed Lampard to lead a review of the Borders, Immigration and Citizenship service. Lampard served as interim chair of the Independent Advisory Panel on Deaths in Custody (November 2015 – June 2016).

She also served as a trustee of the Esmee Fairbairn Foundation (1999–2023). She is a trustee of the Royal Horticultural Society. Lampard was appointed Commander of the Order of the British Empire (CBE) in the 2015 New Year Honours for services to the National Health Service and to the community in Kent.

Lampard is a Deputy Lieutenant of the County of Kent.

=== House of Lords ===
It was announced on 14 October 2022, that as part of the 2022 Special Honours, Lampard would receive a life peerage. On 17 November 2022, she was created Baroness Lampard, of Frinsted in the County of Kent. She initially sat in the House of Lords as a member of the Conservative Party; in July 2024 she became a non-affiliated peer.

In September 2023, Lampard was appointed Chair of the Statutory Inquiry into mental health deaths in Essex, known as the Lampard Inquiry, primarily the death of 2,000 mental health patients in Essex Partnership University NHS Foundation Trust.
