= Harlow Hospital Radio =

England
- Frequency: Internal Cable System

History
- First air date: 1970

Links
- Website: http://www.harlowhospitalradio.com

Harlow Hospital Radio is a registered charity hospital radio station, which broadcasts exclusively to the patients and staff of the Princess Alexandra Hospital in Harlow, Essex. The station was established in 1970.

The station is operated entirely by volunteers, and broadcasts 24 hours a day, 7 days a week from its studio within the hospital. The station produces a biennial Variety Show and an annual pantomime, which is broadcast over the Christmas period. The station also takes part regularly at the Harlow Carnival.

In 2010, the station celebrated its 40th anniversary and held several special events. The studio and office was also refurbished. It was further improved in 2014 in order to make it more accessible to disabled people.

In March 2011, Harlow Hospital Radio won a gold award at the National Hospital Radio Awards, in the Station Promotion category.

In 2021, the station will be celebrating their fiftieth anniversary of their first broadcast show, which was broadcast in 1971. In 2022, following postponement following the pandemic, the members of the station broadcast a marathon 52-Hour long live broadcast in October 2022.

Harlow Hospital Radio is a member station of the Hospital Broadcasting Association. Amongst the original presenters where Tony Saxby, Russ Lewell, Nigel Cayne, Tony Poole and Ian Simmonds.
