= The Outfield Live =

Live album by the Outfield
- Released: 27 December 2005
- Genres: Pop rock, power pop
- Length: 47:57
- Producer: The Outfield

The Outfield chronology
Live in Brazil (2001)	The Outfield Live (2005)	Any Time Now (2006)

The Outfield Live is the second live album recorded and released by the British rock band the Outfield. It is the band's second and final live recording, which was made available as a free download via the band's official website in late 2005. The 12-track album features some of the band's past hits, as well as some newer songs, recorded live in 2003 during their performance at the Surf Ballroom in Clear Lake, Iowa.

It is widely considered among fans as an incomplete album. The band's set for its 2003 tour included several more songs than the track listing represented on The Outfield Live as it was released. At least two cover songs were performed on that tour, including Oasis' "Wonderwall" with John Spinks on lead vocals, and Led Zeppelin's "Rock and Roll." Bootleg recordings of these songs and others— not recorded at the Surf Ballroom show— are known to exist.

The artwork that was made available with the downloadable music files for The Outfield Live was created by long-time fan Ray Pilarczyk, whose Picasso-inspired depiction of the band as the "Three Musicians" was used as the CD cover image for the Extra Innings release in 1999. However, several different album artworks for the collection exist across the internet.

== Track listing ==
1. "Intro"
2. "This Love Affair"
3. "Closer To Me"
4. "It's All About Love"
5. "61 Seconds"
6. "Talk To Me"
7. "Voices Of Babylon"
8. "Winning It All"
9. "Since You've Been Gone"
10. "For You"
11. "My Paradise"
12. "All The Love"

== Personnel ==
- Tony Lewis - vocals, bass
- John Spinks - guitar, keyboard, vocals
- Jeffery Gish - drums
