= North Essex Partnership University NHS Foundation Trust =

- Type: NHS hospital trust
- Disbanded: 1 April 2017
- Staff: 2000

North Essex Partnership University NHS Foundation Trust was an NHS Foundation Trust which provided mental health services in Essex, England. It had offices at Ipswich Road and Severalls House Complex in Colchester; the Chelmsford & Essex Centre, the Crystal Centre, Edward House, the Christopher Unit and Linden Centre Mental Health Wards in Chelmsford; the St Aubyn Centre, Holmer Court, the King's Wood Centre and The Lakes in Colchester; Kitwood and Roding Mental Health Wards in Epping; Shannon House, the Derwent Centre and the Brian Roycroft, Chelmer, Stort and Cam Mental Health Wards in Harlow; the Landermere Centre and the Peter Bruff Mental Health Ward in Clacton; Cherry Trees Therapy Centre at St Peter's Hospital, Maldon. It provided dental services at Saffron Walden Community Hospital.

The trust was under investigation for a number of years by Essex Police for the corporate manslaughter of 25 patients and then in early 2021 prosecuted by Health And safety executive under section 3 of the Health and Safety at Work Act. The trust pleaded guilty to failings contributing to the deaths of 11 patients, including Matthew Leahy and Ben Morris both 20 years old.

It merged with South Essex Partnership University NHS Foundation Trust in March 2017 to form Essex Partnership University NHS Foundation Trust.

The Trust delivered the Family Nurse Partnership in south east Essex since 2007 and in 2014 it was agreed to extend the service to the whole of Essex.

The Trust invested £9.7m in the extension and refurbishment contract at the Derwent Centre in Harlow in 2014.

It ran the Veteran's First service which supports homeless ex-service personnel.

== Performance ==
After an inspection in January 2014 by the Care Quality Commission of the Basildon Mental Health Unit, Nethermayne, the Trust has been rapped for under-staffing and poor record keeping. High risk patients at the Basildon mental hospital were at risk of 'unsafe or inappropriate' care, inspectors ruled. The ward 'relied heavily on bank and agency staff'.

It was named by the Health Service Journal as one of the top hundred NHS trusts to work for in 2015. At that time it had 1771 full time equivalent staff and a sickness absence rate of 4.3%. 55% of staff recommend it as a place for treatment and 51% recommended it as a place to work.

The Parliamentary and Health Service Ombudsman called for a national review into “systemic failings” at the trust in 2019 following the deaths of two young men at the Linden Centre in Chelmsford. The Essex Police decided in November 2018 that there was not sufficient evidence to justify corporate manslaughter charges in relation to 25 patient deaths.

Matthew Leahy's care plan was 'falsified' by staff after being found hanged at Chelmsford's Linden Centre. The Parliamentary and Health Service Ombudsman called for a national review into “systemic failings” at the trust in 2019 following the deaths of two young men at the Linden Centre in Chelmsford. The Essex Police decided in November 2018 that there was not sufficient evidence to justify corporate manslaughter charges in relation to 25 patient deaths. Mr Leahy's care plan was written after his death. The Rob Brehens, PHSO said that “he was failed in the most appalling way by those entrusted with his care”.

== See also ==
- Healthcare in Essex
- List of NHS trusts
- Parliamentary and Health Service Ombudsman
