= Princess Alexandra Hospital NHS Trust =

- Type: NHS trust
- Established: 22 December 1994
- Headquarters: Hamstel Road; Harlow; CM20 1QX
- Hospitals: Herts and Essex Hospital; Princess Alexandra Hospital; St Margaret's Hospital
- Staff: 3,600 (2019/20)
- Website: www.pah.nhs.uk

The Princess Alexandra Hospital NHS Trust serves a population of 258,000 and provides healthcare services to the communities of Harlow and the surrounding areas. It runs Princess Alexandra Hospital in Harlow, Essex, England which is a 419 bedded District General Hospital providing acute and specialist services to a local population of 258,000 people. It has been led since May 2017 by Lance McCarthy (chief executive) and Steve Clarke (chairman). It has a hospital radio station, Harlow Hospital Radio.

In addition to Princess Alexandra Hospital, the trust provides services from St Margaret's Hospital, Epping and Herts and Essex Hospital, Bishops Stortford.

== History ==
The trust was established on 22 December 1994, and became operational on 1 April 1995.

== Development ==
In 2019 it was reported that the trust was considering a new form of private finance initiative developed by Community Health Partnerships for the rebuilding of its Princess Alexandra Hospital on a new site.

== Performance ==
The trust predicts a deficit of £16.6m in 2013–2014. It abandoned plans to become a Foundation Trust in April 2015 and plans to become an integrated care organisation, investigating both "horizontal" and "vertical" integration with other health bodies.

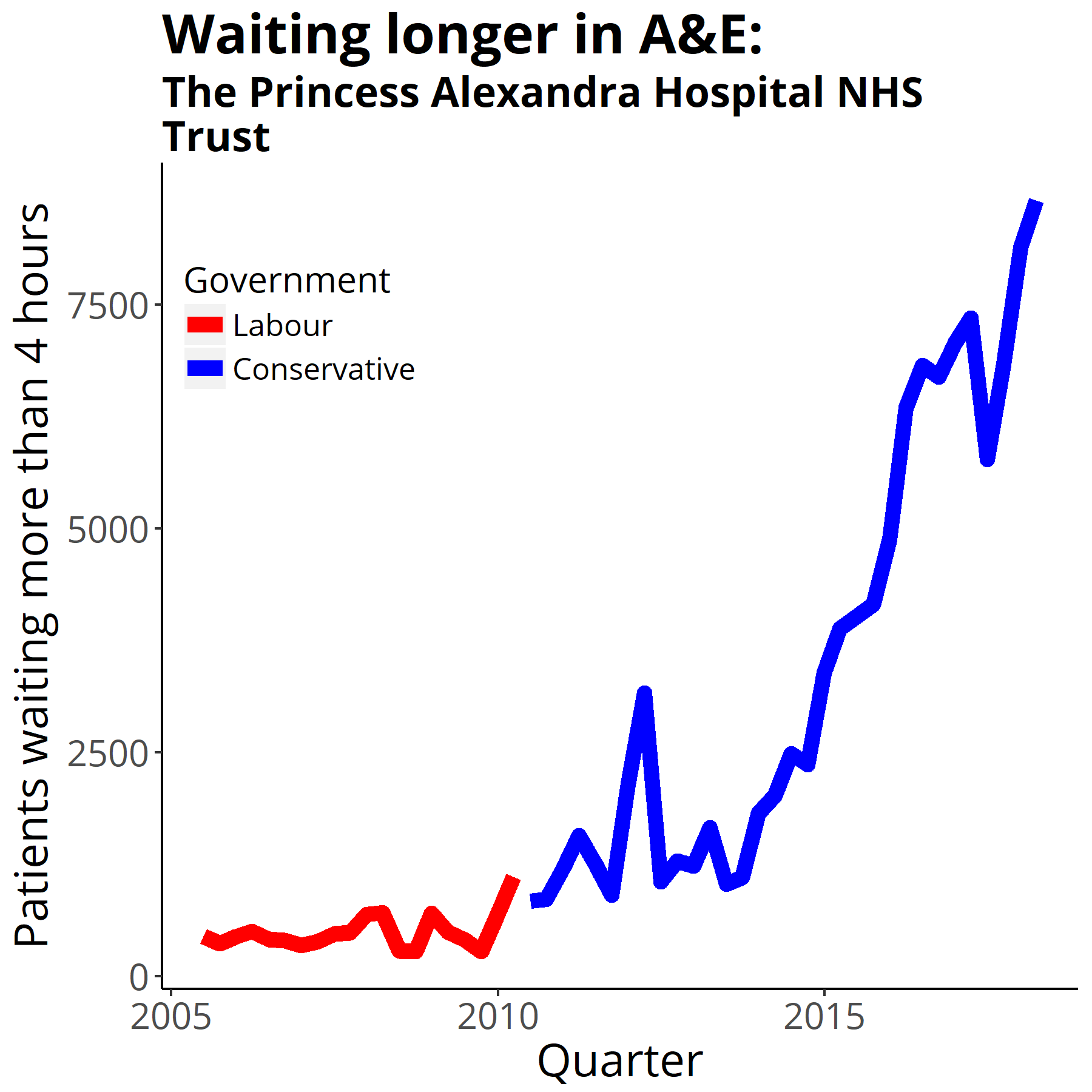
Four-hour target in the emergency department quarterly figures from NHS England Data from https://www.england.nhs.uk/statistics/statistical-work-areas/ae-waiting-times-and-activity/

The trust was one of 26 responsible for half of the national growth in patients waiting more than four hours in accident and emergency over the 2014–2015 winter. There were 2% fewer attendances in 2014–2015 than in 2013–2014, but the number of patients breaching the four-hour target more than doubled to 12,000.

In October 2015 the trust announced that it was closing four beds on each ward, and was unable to see, treat, admit or discharge even 90% of patients within the accident and emergency four-hour target. The chair of the trust said it was "becoming unviable clinically". It expects a deficit of £28.6m in 2015–2016. In the last quarter of 2015 it had one of the worst performances of any hospital in England against the four hour waiting target. Princess Alexandra Hospital only saw 70.9% of A&E patients within four hours during 2017–2018.

== See also ==
- Healthcare in Essex
- List of NHS trusts
