= Bangin' =

Studio album by the Outfield
- Released: 12 June 1987
- Recorded: 1986
- Studios: Air, London
- Genre: Pop rock
- Length: 40:36
- Label: Columbia
- Producer: William Wittman

The Outfield chronology
Play Deep (1985)	Bangin' (1987)	Voices of Babylon (1989)

Bangin' is the second album by the English pop rock band the Outfield, released in 1987. It yielded the top 40 hit, "Since You've Been Gone". The album also contained two other singles, "No Surrender" and "Bangin' on My Heart". "Bangin' on My Heart" reached number 40 on the Billboard rock chart. The album was certified gold by the RIAA. The band supported the album with a North American tour.

== Critical reception ==
Professional ratings
Review scores
Source	Rating
AllMusic	3.5/5 stars
Los Angeles Times	2/4 stars
New Musical Express	3/10
The Rolling Stone Album Guide	3/5 stars
Windsor Star	C

The St. Petersburg Times wrote: "The Outfield specializes in what you could call an early '80s American Sound... It's music by recipe: You take hyper-macho hard rock and tone it down so it will appeal to the over-17 set." USA Today called the band a "middleweight, pop-rock group." The Los Angeles Times deemed them "nice, clean Anglo popsters with plenty of teeth in their smiles but none in their music." Newsday opined that some songs "make Bon Jovi sound like innovators, make the Starship seem like a band on the cutting edge."

== Track listing ==
All songs were written by John Spinks except noted.

1. "Somewhere in America" – 4:12
2. "Bangin' on My Heart" – 3:57
3. "No Surrender" – 4:47
4. "Moving Target" – 4:18
5. "Long Way Home" (John Spinks, Rick DiFonzo) – 4:22
6. "Playground" – 4:59
7. "Alone with You" – 3:17
8. "Main Attraction" – 3:54
9. "Better Than Nothing" – 4:04
10. "Since You've Been Gone" – 4:46

== Personnel ==
The Outfield

- Tony Lewis – vocals, bass guitar
- John Spinks – guitar, vocals
- Alan Jackman – drums

Additional performers

- Frank Callaghan – additional backing vocals
- Peter Wood – synthesisers on "Alone Wish You"
- The Filth Sisters – synthesisers on "No Surrender"
- Dee Long – synthesiser programming

Production

- William Wittman – production
- John Agnello – engineering
- Steve Lyon – assistant engineer
- George Marino – mastering

== Charts ==
Chart (1987)	Peak position
Canadian Albums (Billboard)	56
US Billboard 200	18

== Certifications ==
Region	Certification	Certified units/sales
United States (RIAA)	Gold	500,000^{^}
^{^} Shipments figures based on certification alone.
