= Herts and Essex Hospital =

Herts and Essex Community Hospital
- Princess Alexandra Hospital NHS Trust
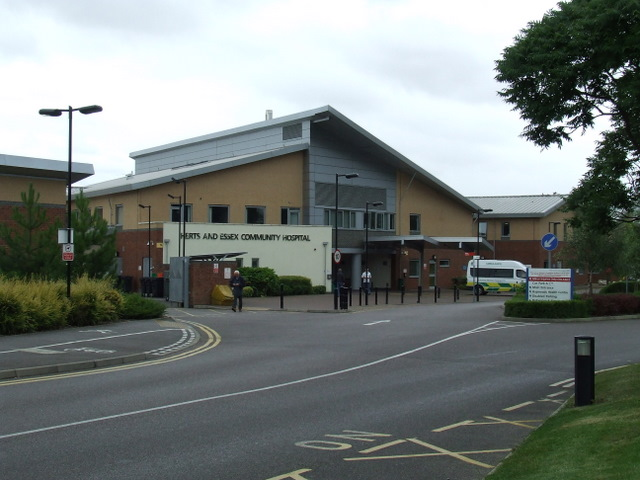
- Herts and Essex Community Hospital

- Shown in Hertfordshire

Geography
- Location: Bishop's Stortford, England, United Kingdom
- Coordinates: 51.86574°N 0.17484°E

Organisation
- Care system: Public NHS
- Type: General

History
- Founded: 1939

Links
- Website: www.hct.nhs.uk/our-services/herts-essex-community-hospital-inpatient-unit/
- Lists: Hospitals in England

The Herts and Essex Hospital, more formally known as The Herts and Essex Community Hospital, is a community hospital in Bishop's Stortford, Hertfordshire. It is managed by the Princess Alexandra Hospital NHS Trust.

== History ==
The hospital was established as an infirmary for the local Public Assistance Institute in 1939. During the Second World War, using temporary prefabricated buildings so as to increase its capacity to 900 beds, it was transformed into a hospital for servicemen. The hospital joined the National Health Service in 1948 and, following further expansion, its capacity was increased to 1,900 beds. Following cut-backs, the accident and emergency department closed in November 1990 and inpatient services transferred to the Princess Alexandra Hospital in Harlow in April 1995. In 2001 a new community hospital was procured for the site under a Private Finance Initiative contract. The new facility, which was built at a cost of £15 million, opened in 2003.

== Services ==
The hospital provides a range of services and has a minor injuries unit on site.

== See also ==
- List of hospitals in England
