= North East London NHS Foundation Trust =

NHS foundation trust based in London, England

- Type: NHS foundation trust
- Established: 5 June 2000
- Headquarters: Rainham, London, England
- Hospitals: Goodmayes Hospital
- Staff: 7,441 WTE (2022)
- Website: www.nelft.nhs.uk

North East London NHS Foundation Trust (NELFT) is an NHS foundation trust which provides mental and community health services. On 28 August 2025, the trust was rated Good by the CQC. NELFT supports people living in the London boroughs of Barking & Dagenham, Havering, Redbridge and Waltham Forest and community health services for people living in the south west Essex areas of Basildon, Brentwood and Thurrock.

== History ==
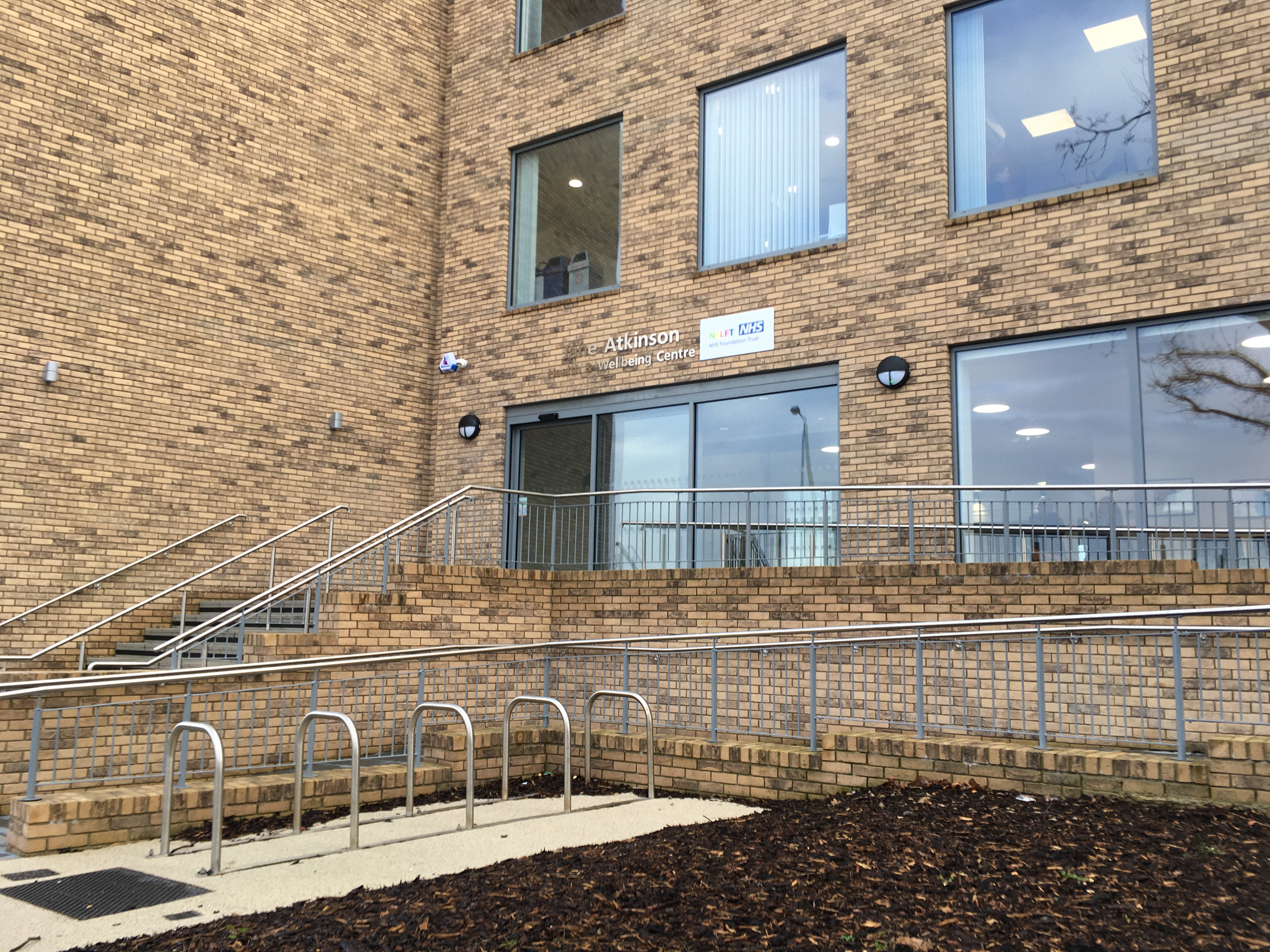
The Jane Atkinson Health and Wellbeing Centre, built on the site of the former Thorpe Coombe Hospital

The trust was established as the North East London Mental Health NHS Trust on 5 June 2000, and became operational on 1 April 2001. It became an NHS foundation trust in 2008.

In April 2014 Staff at Hawkwell Court in Colvin Gardens, Chingford planned to shut down the facility, which offers long-term stay for older patients with mental health problems and learning disabilities. It was saved from closure a decade ago after relatives of service users and Chingford MP Iain Duncan Smith intervened.

In April 2014 as part of the redevelopment of Goodmayes Hospital it closed and proposed to demolish the Goodmayes Hospital Staff Social Club, provoking a protest from Mr Fin Robinson. He was supposed to hand the keys back but said he will remain inside, with the doors chained shut, "until they do the right thing".

== Services ==
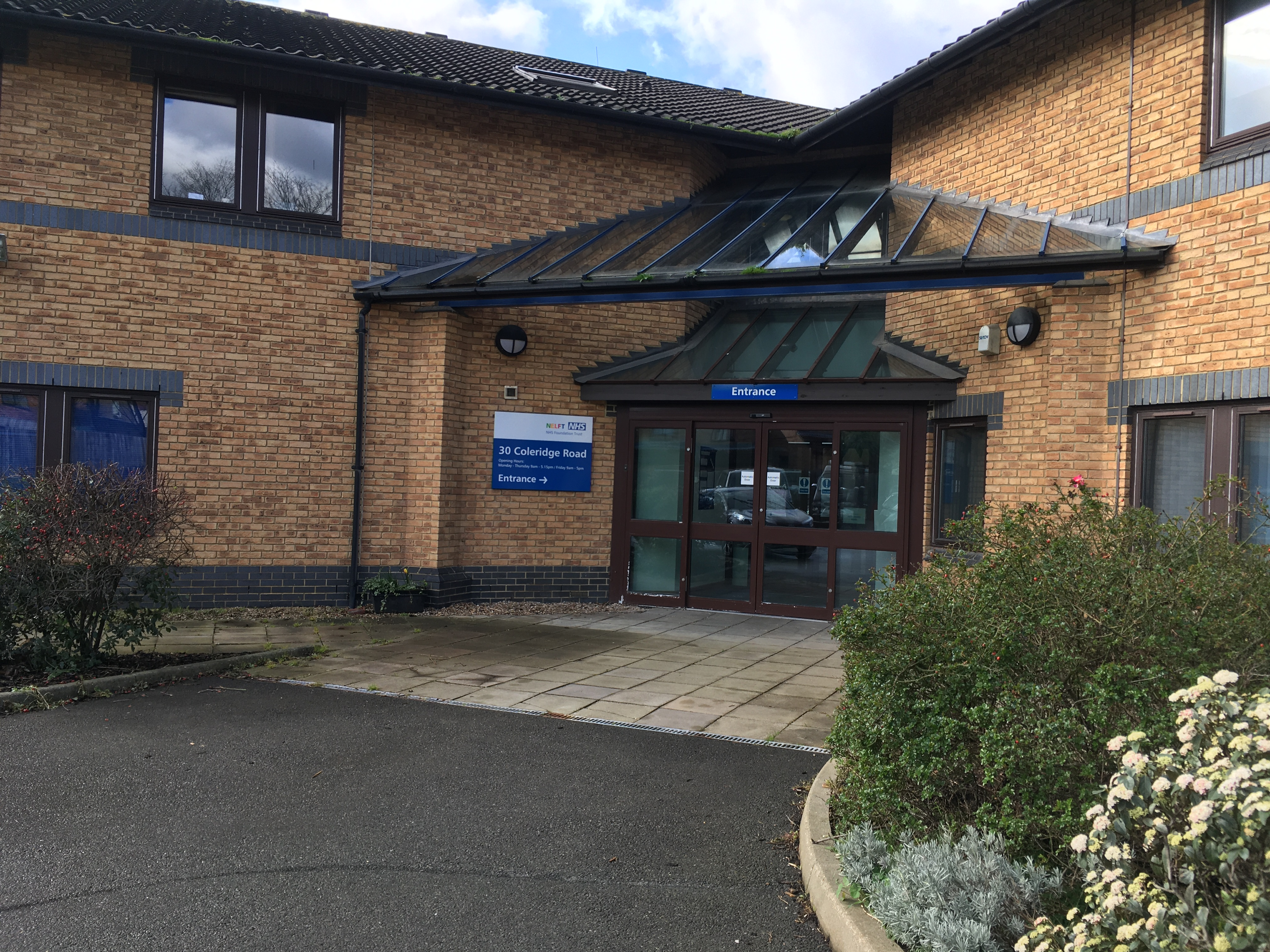
30 Coleridge Road in Walthamstow

The trust provides community health and mental health services, including forensic services, psychiatric intensive care units and services for people with learning difficulties in the North East London boroughs of Barking and Dagenham, Havering, Redbridge and Waltham Forest, as well as some services for people in Essex and Kent.

== Patient entertainment ==
The Trust receives hospital radio services operated by Bedrock Radio

In 1977 The Goodmayes Hospitals Radio Association was formed as a registered charity to provide entertainment and information to the patients and staff, with studios located within the original Goodmayes Hospital building.

In 1993 the station began broadcasting into neighbouring King George Hospital, In 2004 the station's on-air name became 'The Jumbo Sound' and began streaming online in 2006 to serve all NELFT locations.

In April 2016, flood damage caused by a failed radiator forced The Jumbo Sound off-air creating an estimated £30,000 of damage. Volunteers of the Goodmayes Hospital Radio Association (Jumbo Sound) voted to merge with Bedrock Radio.

== Performance ==
The trust NELFT took over children and young people's specialist and targeted mental health services in Kent in 2017. In May 2018 there were 3,869 young people in Kent waiting for treatment. 144 had been waiting more than a year, with 19 more in Medway. 1,481 had been waiting for more than 18 weeks for treatment to start. In 2019 the Trust was downgraded by the CQC from Good to Requires Improvement.

There have been numerous deaths as a result of NELFT's failings. In the first half of 2021 alone, there was a coroner who found failings in the care of Paul Tufton leading to his death. In May an inquest found neglect in the care of Neil Challinor-Mooney, again leading to a death. In June, Ellis Murphy-Richards' suicide was deemed to have been because of failings in care. In July, Anita Mandalia took an overdose as a result of NELFT failing to refer her for mental health treatment. There have been hundreds of NELFT's mental health patients who have gone missing; in the two years prior to 2020, 100+ such patients went missing.

NELFT, together with Essex Partnership University NHS Foundation Trust and other mental health providers in Essex were subject an independent inquiry set up by Parliament into mental health services in Essex following numerous failings of these services. The inquiry was upgraded to a statutory inquiry in 2023 given the lack of cooperation the inquiry got from the trusts and is now the Lampard Inquiry.
