= Voices of Babylon =

Studio album by the Outfield
- Released: 28 March 1989
- Recorded: Sunset Sound Recorders, Hollywood, California; Farmyard Studio, Little Chalfont, Bucks; Scarf Studio, London January–April 1988
- Genres: Pop rock, power pop
- Length: 40:36
- Label: Columbia
- Producers: John Spinks, David Kahne, David Leonard

The Outfield chronology
Bangin' (1987)	Voices of Babylon (1989)	Diamond Days (1990)

Professional ratings
Review scores
Source	Rating
Allmusic	3/5 stars

Voices of Babylon is the third studio album by the British band the Outfield, released during the spring of 1989 and which spawned an eponymous single. It was the group's last album to feature drummer Alan Jackman until the release of Replay in 2011. It was also their final album on the Columbia label. Following the album's release, and with their commercial success slipping, the band parted ways with Jackman and hired Paul Read as a replacement for the album's tour.

The album features a unique script similar to what is known as the Pigpen cipher. On the album cover, the script says "OUTFIELD" and the liner notes show the title of each album track in that script.

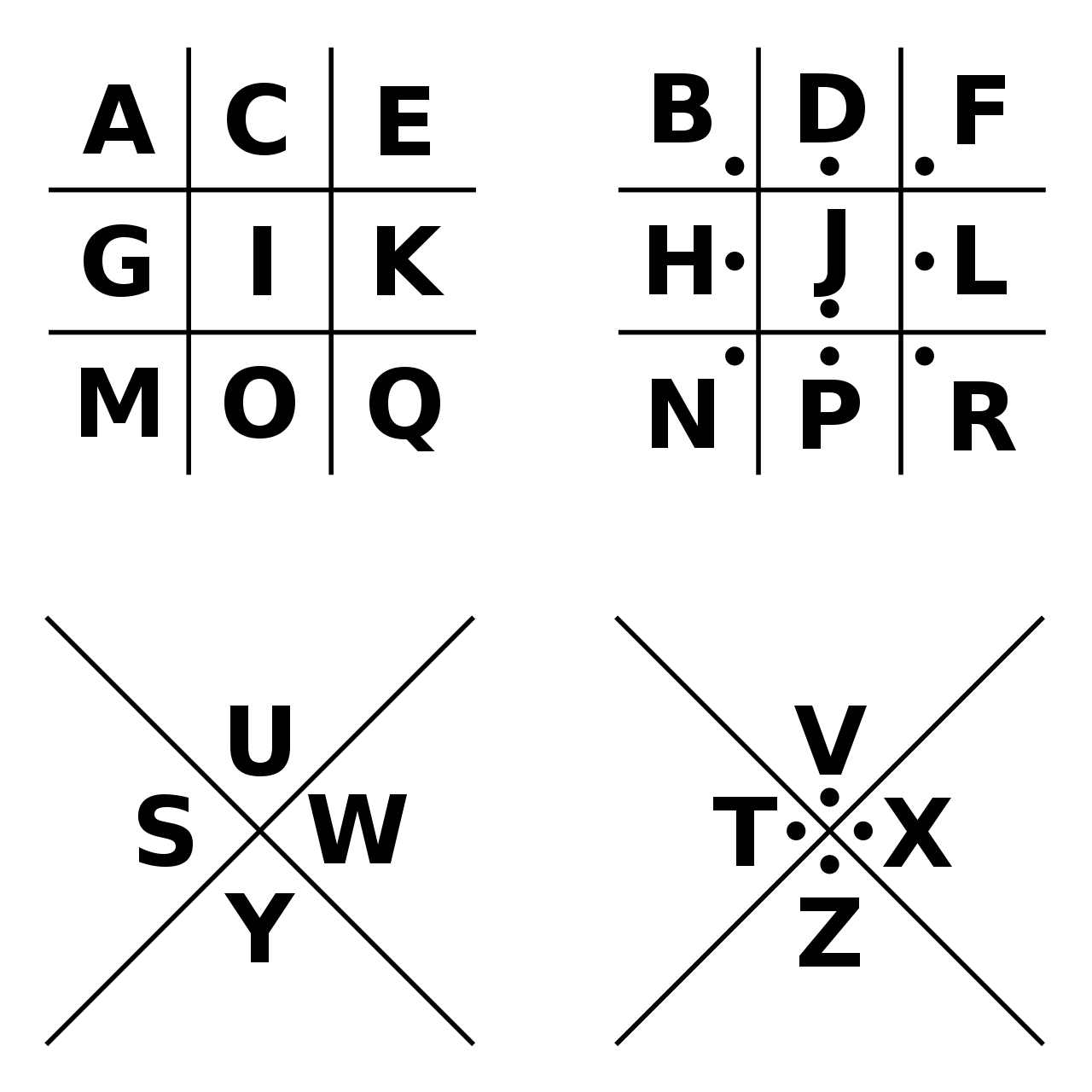
Modified Pigpen cipher used for album cover and liner notes

== Track listing ==
All songs were written by John Spinks, except for "Taken By Surprise", which was written by John Spinks and Tony Lewis.

No.	Title	Length
1.	"Voices of Babylon"	3:27
2.	"My Paradise"	3:40
3.	"Part of Your Life"	4:00
4.	"Shelter Me"	3:53
5.	"The Night Ain't Over"	4:07
6.	"No Point"	3:02
7.	"Taken By Surprise"	3:11
8.	"Reach Out"	3:32
9.	"Makin' Up"	2:48
10.	"Inside Your Skin"	3:28

== Personnel ==
The Outfield

- Tony Lewis – lead vocals, bass guitar
- John Spinks – guitar, vocals
- Alan Jackman – drums

Technical personnel

- David Kahne – production, additional keyboards
- David Leonard – production, recording, mixing
- John Spinks – production
- Nigel Palmer – additional engineering
- Stephen Marcussen – mastering

== Singles ==
The album's title track was a Top 40 hit single, peaking at #25 on the Billboard Hot 100 and #2 on the Billboard Mainstream Rock Tracks chart. The second-single "My Paradise" peaked at #72 on the Billboard Hot 100, not achieving the expected success. "Part of Your Life" was released as a promotional single, but failed to gain significant airplay.

"The Night Ain't Over" was released as a single in Canada, featuring a previously unreleased track "Better Get Ready" as the B-Side.
