= For You (The Outfield song) =

1990 single by the Outfield

Single by the Outfield

from the album Diamond Days
- B-side: "One Night in Heaven"
- Released: 1990
- Recorded: 1990
- Studio: Wildlife Studio (Ipswich, Suffolk)
- Genre: Pop rock
- Length: 4:26
- Label: MCA
- Songwriter: John Spinks
- Producer: John Spinks

The Outfield singles chronology
"The Night Ain't Over" (1989)	"For You" (1990)	"Take It All" (1991)

"For You" is a song by the English rock band the Outfield. It was the lead single from their fourth studio album, Diamond Days (1990), released on MCA Records. The single was released in 1990. In the U.S., the song hit number 13 on the Billboard Album Rock Tracks chart and number 21 on the Billboard Hot 100. It was the best-performing single from Diamond Days, as well as the group's last top 40 hit.

== Charts ==
=== Weekly charts ===
Chart (1990–91)	Peak position
Canada Top Singles (RPM)	11
US Adult Contemporary (Billboard)	13
US Billboard Hot 100	21
US Album Rock Tracks (Billboard)	13

=== Year-end charts ===
Chart (1991)	Position
Canada Top Singles (RPM)	85
