= Tony Lewis (musician) =

English musician (1957–2020)

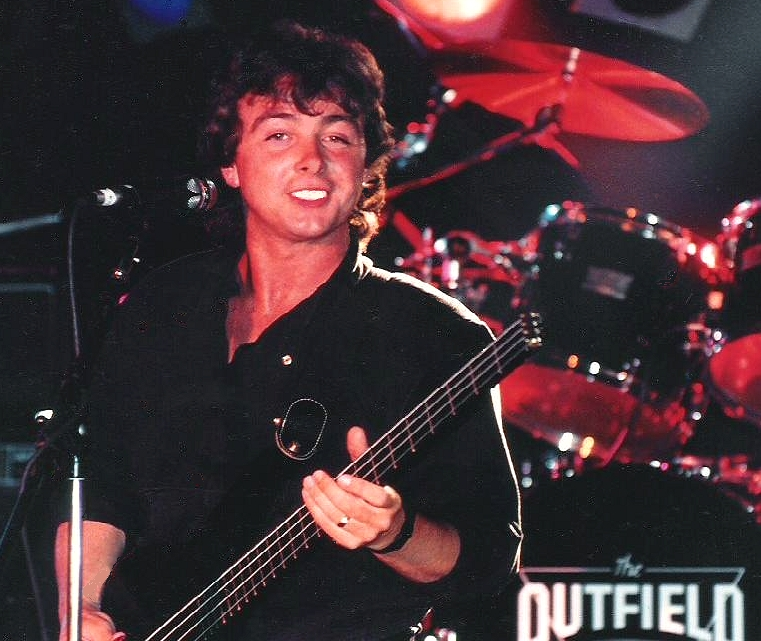
- Lewis performing in 1986

Background information
- Born: 21 December 1957; London, England
- Died: 19 October 2020 (aged 62) London, England
- Genres: Pop rock; indie rock; power pop
- Occupations: Singer; songwriter; musician
- Instruments: Vocals; bass guitar
- Years active: 1984–2020
- Formerly of: The Outfield
- Website: www.tonylewismusic.com

Tony G Lewis (21 December 1957 – 19 October 2020) was an English singer and musician. He was the lead singer and bassist of the pop-rock band the Outfield, best known for their hit singles "Your Love" and "All the Love in the World". After a long career with that band, Lewis began work as a solo artist, releasing his first album Out of the Darkness in 2018 on Madison Records.

== Early life ==
Lewis was born on 21 December 1957 in the East End of London and grew up in a tough, working-class neighbourhood. Music served as a bright spot in his life, and his love for music started early. The radio was always on in Lewis's home, and his first influences were classics of the 1960s. At age 9, Lewis first heard the Beatles, and he was immediately hooked by the British rock band. Later he became a big fan of T. Rex, David Bowie, the Rolling Stones, and other glam rock bands from the 1970s.

In secondary school, Lewis took his love of music a step further, forming his first band with Alan Jackman; Lewis played bass guitar, and Jackman played drums.

A few years later, the two joined up with guitar player John Spinks and formed a progressive rock band they named Sirius B. But in the mid-1970s, the punk rock scene was exploding in London; the progressive music of Sirius B was no longer in demand, and they disbanded. Lewis then went out on his own, playing in various local bands and clubs around London, often stepping up to the microphone to sing lead vocals.

== The Outfield ==
Lewis was playing gigs around London when Spinks ran into him again. He heard Lewis singing and was inspired to get the band back together. They joined up again with Jackman, this time forming a band they called the Baseball Boys. They toured around the UK, honing the power-pop sound that had been their signature. After touring for a while and tightening up their sound, the band gained a reputation for playing "American-sounding" music. After recording demos at Scarf Studios, they caught a break when they signed with an American management company. The new manager suggested a name change to the Outfield, and helped them sign a record deal. The Outfield released their first album in 1985, Play Deep.

Play Deep became a multi-platinum selling album and reached the top 10 on the U.S. Billboard 200 chart. The single "Your Love" made it to number 6 on the Billboard Hot 100 chart.

The Outfield toured extensively, and the band released their second album Bangin in 1987, and a third album, Voices of Babylon, in 1989. Throughout the late 1980s, the band continued to tour throughout the United States.

After Voices of Babylon was released, drummer Jackman parted ways with the band, but Lewis continued to work with Spinks and various drummers to continue recording as the Outfield, releasing albums on a fairly regular basis:

- 1989: Voices of Babylon
- 1990: Diamond Days
- 1992: Rockeye
- 2006: Anytime Now
- 2011: Replay

== Solo career ==
In 2014, Spinks died of liver cancer at the age of 60. His friendship and musical partnership meant a lot to Lewis, and the loss of his friend was devastating. Afterwards, Lewis decided to take a break from music for two years. His wife Carol, whom he married in 1985 eventually encouraged him to begin recording again, and get back to what he really loved doing, and what had always brought him comfort. He returned to his solo roots, revisiting early lyrical ideas and playing around with a body of backing tracks. Eventually, he teamed up with his wife Carol; he discovered she had a talent for writing lyrics.

Lewis and his wife collaborated on a new body of work, taking on the spirit of the Outfield while allowing Lewis' own style to shine through. In October 2017, with the support of Randy Sadd of Protocol Entertainment (who was a radio promoter for the Outfield from 2004 to 2011), Lewis was introduced to Tanner Hendon and was signed to the latter's record label Madison Records. A new album was soon released, Out of the Darkness, featuring the lead-off single "Into the Light". On this new album, Lewis played all the instruments, as well as producing and recording everything himself. A posthumous six song EP named More Than I Dared was released in November 2020.

== Personal life ==
Lewis was born and raised in the London Borough of Tower Hamlets in the East End of London, where the capital's rich music scene sparked his early interest in music.

In 1985, he married his wife Carol, who became a steady source of encouragement in both his personal and professional life. She contributed to his solo projects, helping shape his creative direction during later years. The couple maintained a private family life centered on their two daughters, Gemma and Rosie, and three grandchildren.

Lewis was a supporter of West Ham United F.C.

== Death ==
Lewis died suddenly and unexpectedly on 19 October 2020, at the age of 62, at his home near London. His cause of death was not publicly disclosed by his family or representatives.

His passing was confirmed through a statement from his publicist, Bari Lieberman, which was shared on Lewis's official social media accounts and quickly reported by major news outlets including the BBC and Rolling Stone. The statement read: "It is with great sadness and sorrow to announce that Tony Lewis has unexpectedly passed away. He was a beautiful soul who touched so many lives with his music and infectious spirit."

Initial tributes poured in from fans worldwide via social media, expressing grief and gratitude for his contributions to 1980s pop-rock, while former band associates and the broader music community acknowledged his warm personality and talent.
