= Farleigh Hospice =

Geography
- Location: Chelmsford, Essex, England
- Coordinates: 51.776450°N 0.467900°E

History
- Founded: 4 March 1982

Links
- Website: Official Website
- Lists: Hospitals in England

Farleigh Hospice is a registered charity which provides hospice care to people affected by life limiting illnesses across mid Essex. Since being established in 1982, the Hospice and its team of healthcare professionals, has grown and evolved to meet the changing needs of the community it serves. As of March 2024 it has 327 employees and over 600 volunteers. Michelle Kabia was appointed chief executive in August 2025.
