= Extra Innings (album) =

Studio album by the Outfield
- Released: 27 July 1999
- Recorded: 1998–1999
- Genre: Pop rock
- Length: 60:04
- Label: Platinum Entertainment

The Outfield chronology
It Ain't Over... (1998)	Extra Innings (1999)	Live in Brazil (2001)

Professional ratings
Review scores
Source	Rating
AllMusic	3/5 stars

Extra Innings is an album by the British band the Outfield. It features a total of fifteen tracks, including eleven songs from their fan-club release It Ain't Over... as well as some new recordings dating from shortly before the album's release in 1999. The version of "Lay Down" on Extra Innings is a combination of the It Ain't Over... songs "Lay Down" and "It Ain't Over".

== Track listing ==
All tracks by John Spinks except where noted.

1. "Heaven's Little Angel" – 4:07
2. "Lay Down" – 3:44
3. "Certain Kinda' Love" – 3:57
4. "Kiss the Rain" – 3:51
5. "Girl of Mine" (Spinks, Lewis) – 4:10
6. "Midnight Moves" – 4:08
7. "Dance the Night Away" – 4:16
8. "Slow Motion" – 3:17
9. "Talking 'Bout Us" – 3:36
10. "My Girlfriend's Girlfriend" – 3:30
11. "One Love" – 4:47
12. "It's a Crime" – 4:26
13. "Chic Lorraine" – 4:08
14. "Out to Lunch" – 3:24
15. "They Can't Knock You Down Again" – 4:52

== Personnel ==
- Tony Lewis – vocals, bass
- John Spinks – guitar, keyboard, vocals
- Simon Dawson – drums, vocals
