= Lampard Inquiry =

UK inquiry into mental health deaths

The Lampard Inquiry is a public inquiry ordered by the British Parliament into mental health deaths in Essex, England, particularly circa 2,000 deaths of mental health patients in Essex Partnership University NHS Foundation Trust (EPUT). It was launched on 1 November 2023.

It is an upgrade of the previous Independent Inquiry which was upgraded at the request of the Independent Inquiry Chair, Dr. Geraldine Strathdee, who reported to Parliament that, due to the lack of cooperation of EPUT staff, the Inquiry could not continue without statutory powers and the ability to force employees to give evidence.

It is chaired by Baroness Lampard who announced a public consultation following which the Terms of Reference were agreed and published. The counsel to the inquiry was Nicholas Griffin KC.

While the Independent Inquiry was tasked with mental health deaths in all of Essex, covering multiple NHS trusts, the lessons learned from the Independent Inquiry process has focused the attention on EPUT, and the two trusts that were merged to form EPUT, as that's where the large majority of deaths have occurred.

== See also ==
- List of public inquiries in the United Kingdom
