= Voices of Babylon (song) =

Single by the Outfield

from the album Voices of Babylon
- B-side: "Inside Your Skin"
- Released: March 1989 (US); April 1989 (UK)
- Genre: Pop rock; power pop
- Length: 3:27
- Label: Columbia
- Songwriter(s): John Spinks
- Producer(s): John Spinks; David Kahne; David Leonard

The Outfield singles chronology
"No Surrender" (1988)	"Voices of Babylon" (1989)	"My Paradise" (1989)

Audio sample
- "Voices Of Babylon": file; help

"Voices of Babylon" is a song by English rock band the Outfield, taken from their third studio album Voices of Babylon. It was written by guitarist John Spinks, produced by Spinks, David Kahne, and David Leonard, and released as the lead single from the album in March 1989.

It became the band's biggest hit on Billboard's Album Rock Tracks chart, peaking at number two; it was also a top 30 hit in the U.S., peaking at number 25 on the Hot 100. Outside the U.S., the song fared less well, but represented the band's top single peak in the United Kingdom (although only at No. 78).

== Charts ==
Chart (1989)	Peak position
Australia (ARIA)	162
Canada Top Singles (RPM)	39
UK Singles (OCC)	78
US Billboard Hot 100	25
US Album Rock Tracks (Billboard)	2
West Germany (GfK)	57
