= Play Deep =

1985 studio album by the Outfield

Studio album by the Outfield
- Released: 12 November 1985
- Recorded: July 1985
- Studio: AIR (London)
- Genres: Power pop; new wave; pop rock; college rock; jangle pop
- Length: 38:40
- Label: Columbia
- Producer: William Wittman

The Outfield chronology
Play Deep (1985)	Bangin' (1987)

Singles from Play Deep
- 1. "Say It Isn't So" Released: 1985; 2. "Your Love" Released: February 1986 (US); 3. "All the Love" Released: May 1986 (US); 4. "Everytime You Cry" Released: September 1986

Professional ratings
Review scores
Source	Rating
AllMusic	4/5 stars

Play Deep is the debut studio album by English rock band the Outfield, released on 12 November 1985 by Columbia Records. The album received widespread popularity with the success of their debut single, "Say It Isn't So" (a regional number-one hit), which reached number 18 on the U.S. rock chart, and the follow-up single, "Your Love", which reached number 6 on the Billboard Hot 100 in 1986. Play Deep peaked at number 9 on the U.S. albums chart and was later certified double Platinum. In total, four of the tracks reached the charts: the aforementioned two, along with "Everytime You Cry" and "All the Love in the World".

The singles, "Your Love" and "All the Love", reached numbers 83 and 96, respectively, on the UK Singles Chart.

== Track listing ==
All tracks are written by John Spinks.

No.	Title	Length
1.	"Say It Isn't So"	3:48
2.	"Your Love"	3:36
3.	"I Don't Need Her"	3:51
4.	"Everytime You Cry"	4:29
5.	"61 Seconds"	4:18
6.	"Mystery Man"	4:04
7.	"All the Love"	3:32
8.	"Talk to Me"	3:34
9.	"Taking My Chances"	3:37
10.	"Nervous Alibi"	3:52
Total length:		38:40

== Personnel ==
=== The Outfield ===
- Tony Lewis – lead vocals and backing vocals, bass
- John Spinks – guitar, lead vocals on "Taking My Chances" and backing vocals
- Alan Jackman – drums

=== Additional musicians ===
- Reg Webb – keyboards
- Frank Callaghan – additional vocals
- Grahame Leslie – additional vocals

=== Technical ===
- William Wittman – production, recording, mixing
- Rick Chertoff – executive production
- Andy "Carb" Canelle – recording
- John Agnello – mixing
- George Marino – mastering at Sterling Sound (New York City)

== Charts ==
=== Weekly charts ===
Weekly chart performance for Play Deep
Chart (1986)	Peak position
Canada Top Albums/CDs (RPM)	21
Dutch Albums (Album Top 100)	43
US Billboard 200	9

=== Year-end charts ===
Year-end chart performance for Play Deep
Chart (1986)	Position
Canada Top Albums/CDs (RPM)	89
US Billboard 200	17

== Certifications ==
Certifications for Play Deep
Region	Certification	Certified units/sales
Canada (Music Canada)	Gold	50,000^{^}
United States (RIAA)	2× Platinum	2,000,000^{^}
^{^} Shipments figures based on certification alone.
