= Your Love (The Outfield song) =

Single by the Outfield

from the album Play Deep
- B-side: "61 Seconds"
- Released: 14 February 1986
- Recorded: 26 July 1985
- Studio: Air Studios (London)
- Genre: Pop rock; new wave; power pop
- Length: 3:36
- Label: Columbia
- Songwriter: John Spinks
- Producer: William Wittman

The Outfield singles chronology
"Say It Isn't So" (1985)	"Your Love" (1986)	"All the Love" (1986)

Music video
- "Your Love" on YouTube

"Your Love" is a song by the English rock band The Outfield, taken from their 1985 debut album Play Deep, released in early 1986 and written by guitarist John Spinks. In the United States, the song reached number six on the Billboard Hot 100 and number seven on the Album Rock Tracks chart in 1986.

== Background ==
The song was written by Outfield guitarist John Spinks. Spinks was living in East London and invited the vocalist of the band, Tony Lewis, to his flat for a writing session. The two developed "Your Love" on the porch of the flat. Lewis sat on an amplifier and Spinks began writing the opening lyrics. According to Lewis, the song took only twenty minutes to write. The song's lyrics have no basis in reality: "Josie" was not a real person, and the song is an entirely invented story. Afterwards, the band began recording demos for their debut album Play Deep with producer William Wittman, who had also worked with Cyndi Lauper and the Fixx. The initial demo was softer in tone, and Wittman encouraged the band to take a more hard rock approach to its sound. To this end, the group were inspired by the Who, and Lewis's vocal arrangement was heavily inspired by The Police vocalist Sting.

== Composition ==
"Your Love" is an uptempo new wave, power pop and pop rock song sung by lead vocalist Tony Lewis. The lyrics are vague, but imply that the narrator is interested in a girl that he is not in a relationship with, who may be older or younger depending upon how those lyrics are interpreted. The narrator asks her to let him "use her love"; i.e. have a one night stand with him, while his current girlfriend, Josie, is on vacation.

== Critical reception ==
Rolling Stone contributor Jimmy Guterman wrote that the track "seems to advocate philandering". While Dennis Hunt from the Los Angeles Times criticized the whole of Play Deep as "thoroughly derivative music", he praised the song's "lovely melodic line that's engagingly performed by vocalist Tony Lewis, who has obviously been listening to Journey's Steve Perry".

== Chart performance ==
"Your Love" became a major hit in the United States. It was first promoted as the second single from Play Deep in November 1985, when it was played on album-oriented rock (AOR) radio, to maintain momentum generated by the album's lead single, "Say It Isn't So". After entering the Billboard's Top Rock Tracks chart in January 1986 (which measured the playlists of AOR stations across the U.S.), Columbia began expanding the song to top 40 radio in February. It then peaked at number seven on the Top Rock Tracks chart during the week of 1 March. The song entered the top ten on the Billboard Hot 100 in May 1986, peaking at number six during the week of 10 May. Overall, it spent 22 weeks on the Hot 100.

== Music video ==
The music video has an extended intro and was directed by Jon Jopson. The concept for the clip has the band filming a music video for the song, and prominently features a painting motif (similar to the cover of the album from which the song was taken). They perform in front of a backdrop of the Play Deep album cover, which is also being finger-painted offstage by an artist, played by actress JoAnn Willette. Her character and lead vocalist Tony Lewis appear flirtatious throughout the video. Willette was interviewed about her role on the blog Noblemania in 2013, and gave details about the shoot; it was shot in Astoria, New York on a soundstage at 31-89 Crescent Ave. over one day. At the end of the video, Willette can be seen exiting the studio at dawn, the time the production wrapped. The band appears mainly as playing the song, highlighting their unity as a performing band: "We didn't want a situation where they had to be actors or something that wasn't what they are," said the band's manager, Kip Krones, at the time.

The video was first added to MTV's schedule during the week of 19 February 1986, and began attracting major rotation. It peaked at number two on MTV's Top 20 Countdown in late April 1986. In March 2026, the music video surpassed the one billion view milestone on YouTube.

== Track listings and formats ==
- 7-inch vinyl
1. "Your Love" – 3:22
2. "61 Seconds" – 4:18
- Japanese 7-inch vinyl
1. "Your Love" – 3:22
2. "All the Love in the World" – 3:33
- United Kingdom 12-inch vinyl
1. "Your Love" – 3:22
2. "61 Seconds" – 4:18
3. "Mystery Man" – 4:04

== Credits and personnel ==
Credits and personnel are adapted from the Play Deep album liner notes.

- John Spinks – writer, guitar, backing vocals
- Tony Lewis – lead vocals, bass
- Alan Jackman – drums
- Reg Webb – synthesizer
- Frank Callaghan – backing vocals
- Bill Wittman – backing vocals, producer, recording, mixing
- Andy Canelle – recording
- John Agnello – mixing
- George Marino – mastering

== Charts ==
This song is notable for being the only Outfield song to get significant airplay on adult contemporary stations despite not registering at all on the AC charts while "For You" did, reaching No. 13.

=== Weekly charts ===
Weekly chart performance for "Your Love"
Chart (1986–1987)	Peak position
Canada Top Singles (RPM)	37
Belgium (Ultratop 50 Flanders)	33
Netherlands (Single Top 100)	17
UK Singles (Official Charts)	83
US Billboard Hot 100	6
US Mainstream Rock Airplay (Billboard)	6
West Germany (GfK)	52

2024–2026 weekly chart performance for "Your Love"
Chart (2024–2026)	Peak position
Global 200 (Billboard)	127
Sweden (Sverigetopplistan)	69

=== Year-end charts ===
1986 year-end chart performance for "Your Love"
Chart (1986)	Position
US Billboard Hot 100	62

2024 year-end chart performance for "Your Love"
Chart (2024)	Position
Global 200 (Billboard)	188

== Certifications ==
Certifications for "Your Love"
Region	Certification	Certified units/sales
Denmark (IFPI Danmark)	Gold	45,000^{‡}
Germany (BVMI)	Gold	300,000^{‡}
New Zealand (RMNZ)	3× Platinum	90,000^{‡}
Portugal (AFP)	2× Platinum	20,000^{‡}
Spain (Promusicae)	Platinum	60,000^{‡}
United Kingdom (BPI)	Gold	400,000^{‡}
^{‡} Sales+streaming figures based on certification alone.

== In popular culture ==
The song received a resurgence in popularity in 2002, due to its inclusion in the game Grand Theft Auto: Vice City.

Kelly Clarkson sang the song during a "Kellyoke" session of her talkshow, The Kelly Clarkson Show, in which she sings one of her own songs or a cover.

Retired Colorado Rockies outfielder Charlie Blackmon used "Your Love" as his walk-up song coming to bat.

Retired Chicago White Sox second baseman Gordon Beckham used "Your Love" as his walk-up song coming to bat.

Current Pittsburgh Pirates outfielder Jake Mangum used "Your Love" as his walk-up song coming to bat in 2025 as a member of the Tampa Bay Rays.

The 2011 film Dirty Girl uses the unreleased acoustic version.

In the 2014 film Tammy, "Your Love" is played by the titular character in the opening scene as she drives to work.

The song is adapted by Joe Swanson from Family Guy, in the episode "Encyclopedia Griffin" with Peter Griffin hearing the song's first verse and chorus as Joe's voicemail when he attempts to call him.

The song became an internet meme on various social media platforms in 2021 after Lewis' vocals were compared to the voice of Ed from Ed, Edd n Eddy, voiced by Matt Hill.

It has also been used as incidental music at Athletics home games at Sutter Health Park in 2025.

Since 2015, the New England Patriots have used the song during timeouts in the fourth quarter of close games. The tradition started in 2015 when the Patriots were playing the Baltimore Ravens in an NFL Divisional Playoff Game. The Patriots led by four late in the fourth quarter when the Ravens faced a fourth down to keep the game alive. The Ravens called a timeout first, and the song played over the loudspeaker. During the time-out, the fans started singing the chorus so loud it could be heard on the television broadcast. After the Ravens' timeout ended, the Patriots also called a timeout, and the song played on the loudspeaker again, with the fans singing the chorus, and again it was loud enough to be heard on the television broadcast. The Patriots went on to win that game and that year's Super Bowl.
