= Princess Alexandra Hospital, Harlow =

Princess Alexandra Hospital
- The Princess Alexandra Hospital NHS Trust
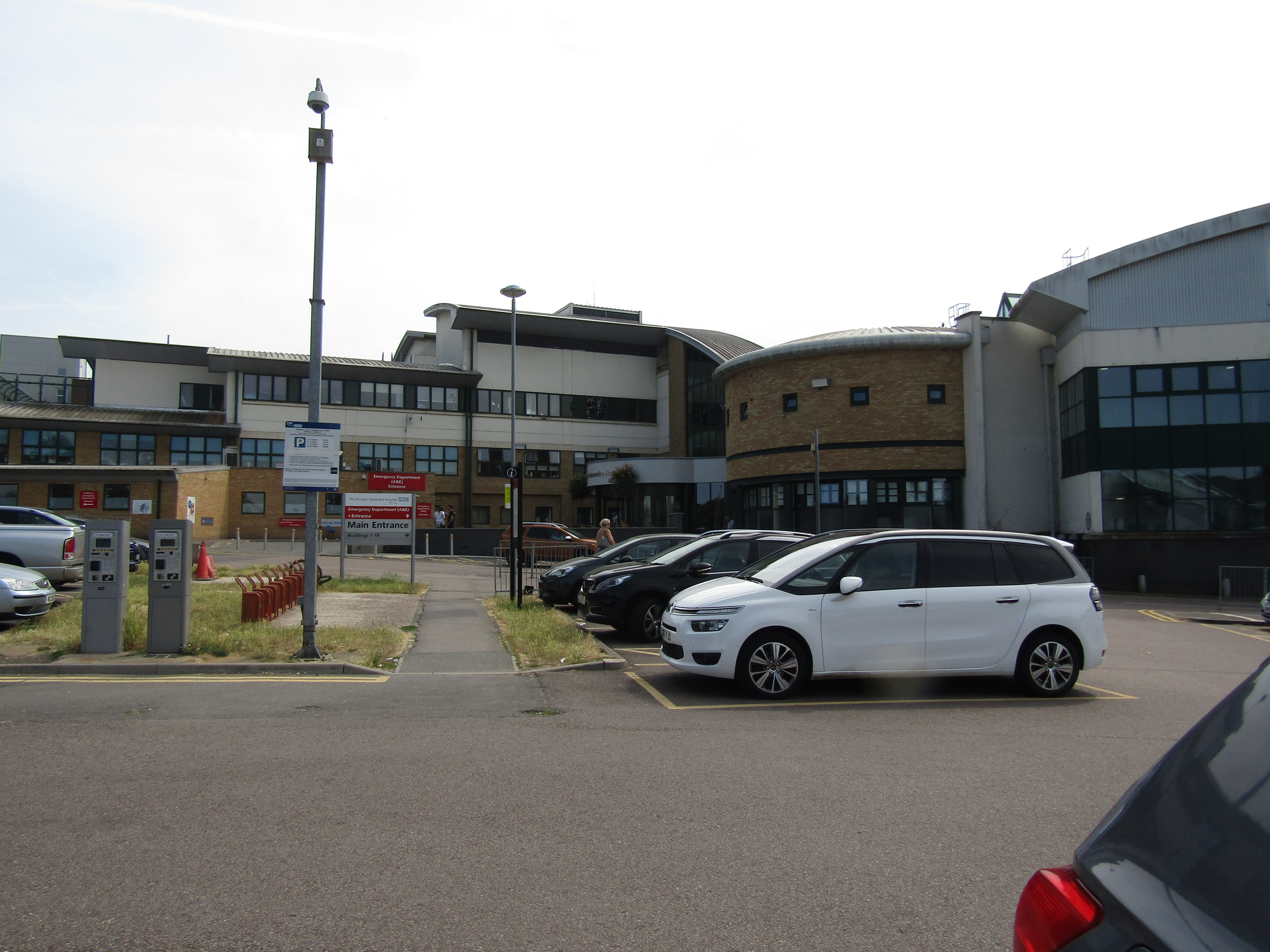
- Princess Alexandra Hospital

- Shown in Essex

Geography
- Location: Hamstel Road, Harlow, Essex, England
- Coordinates: 51.7714°N 0.0864°E

Organisation
- Care system: National Health Service
- Type: General
- Affiliated university: Barts and The London School of Medicine and Dentistry; Anglia Ruskin University

Services
- Emergency department: Yes
- Beds: 501

Helipads
- Helipad: Yes

History
- Founded: 1958

Links
- Website: www.pah.nhs.uk/visiting-our-hospitals

The Princess Alexandra Hospital is an acute general hospital in Harlow, Essex, England. It is managed by the Princess Alexandra Hospital NHS Trust.

== History ==
The hospital, which was designed by Easton & Robertson and built on the site of Parndon Hall, the former home of Godfrey Arkwright, opened in phases between 1958 and 1966. The Kent Wing, designed by the Percy Thomas Partnership, opened in 1996 and the Jenny Ackroyd Centre, designed by Tangram Architects, opened in 2004.

== Teaching ==
The hospital serves as a teaching hospital for medical students from Anglia Ruskin University and Barts and The London School of Medicine and Dentistry.
