= Rockeye =

Studio album by the Outfield
- Released: 31 March 1992
- Recorded: 1991, 1992
- Genres: Progressive rock, power pop
- Length: 39:04
- Label: MCA
- Producer: John Spinks

The Outfield chronology
Diamond Days (1990)	Rockeye (1992)	Playing the Field (1992)

Professional ratings
Review scores
Source	Rating
AllMusic	2/5 stars

Rockeye is the fifth album by the British band the Outfield. It was the band's second album to be released under the MCA label. "Going Back" became a hit single in South Africa on Adult Contemporary radio. The opening track, "Winning It All", was used as the ending song for NBC's broadcasts of the NBA Finals from 1992 to 1996; it was also featured during footage of the Dallas Stars' Stanley Cup championship parade in 1999 and during the end credits of the 1992 film The Mighty Ducks.

== Track listing ==
- All songs written by John Spinks, except where noted.

No.	Title	Writer(s)	Length
1.	"Winning It All"		3:22
2.	"Closer to Me"		3:17
3.	"The Way It Should Be"		3:39
4.	"Under a Stone"		3:14
5.	"Young Love"		3:49
6.	"Jane"		4:28
7.	"Take Me Home"		3:18
8.	"Tonight You're Mine"		3:39
9.	"On the Line"		3:19
10.	"Stranger in My Own Town"	Spinks, Tony Lewis	4:20
11.	"Going Back"		4:39

== Personnel ==
=== The Outfield ===
- Tony T Lewis - vocals, bass
- John Frederick Spinks - electric & acoustic guitar, keyboards; lead vocals on "Under a Stone", "Jane" and "On the Line", backing vocals

=== Additional personnel ===
- Simon Dawson - drums, percussion
- David Fitzgerald - saxophone
- Alvin Lee - lead guitar
- Stephen Marcussen, Ian Thomas - programming
- Reg Webb - piano

== Production ==
  - Adapted from AllMusic.
- Arranged by the Outfield
- Produced by John Spinks
- Engineered by Graham Meek & Nigel "Chopper" Palmer
- Mixed by Nigel Green
- Mastered by Stephen Marcussen
