= The Outfield =

British pop rock band, 1984–2014

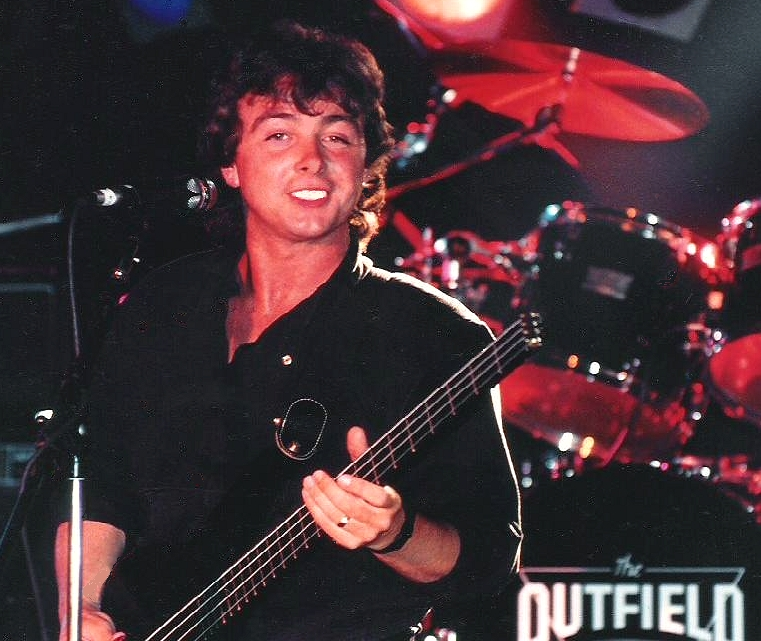
- Tony Lewis of the Outfield performing at the Stone Balloon, a college bar, in Newark, Delaware, 1986

Background information
- Origin: London, England
- Genres: Pop rock; power pop; new wave
- Years active: 1984–2014
- Labels: Columbia; MCA; Warning Tracks; Platinum Entertainment; Tower; Sidewinder; Protocol Entertainment
- Past members: Tony Lewis; John Spinks; Alan Jackman; Simon Dawson
- Website: theoutfield.com

The Outfield were an English pop rock band from the East End of London, formed in 1984. The band achieved success in the mid-1980s and are best remembered for their hit single "Your Love". The band's lineup consisted of guitarist John Spinks, vocalist and bassist Tony Lewis, and drummer Alan Jackman.

The band achieved commercial success in the United States but did not gain similar recognition in their home country, the United Kingdom. They began recording in the mid-1980s and released their first album, Play Deep, in 1985 through Columbia Records. The album was No. 9 on the Billboard 200 list and went double platinum in the United States. The band's single "Your Love" reached No. 6 on the Billboard Hot 100 as well as No. 7 on the Mainstream Rock chart, and it became their signature song. The Outfield continued to record and tour into the early 1990s. While the albums Bangin' (1987) and Voices of Babylon (1989) had some chart successes, the group's popularity waned.

After drummer Alan Jackman left in 1989, the Outfield became a duo and recorded Diamond Days in 1991. After a disappointing response to their 1992 album Rockeye, which represented a shift towards progressive rock and arena rock, the group temporarily disbanded in the 1990s. They resumed touring in 1998 and released two live albums via their website, along with a new studio album, Any Time Now in 2004, which was later re-released in 2006. In 2011, the band released their final album, Replay, with original drummer Alan Jackman re-joining the band. Spinks died in 2014, after which the group officially disbanded.

On 22 March 2018, lead singer/bassist Tony Lewis announced a solo album called Out of the Darkness, which was released on 29 June 2018 through Madison Records. Lewis died on 19 October 2020, aged 62.

== History ==
=== Formation and commercial success (1984–1986) ===
Bassist/singer Tony Lewis, guitarist/keyboardist and songwriter John Spinks and drummer Alan Jackman played together in the late 1970s in a power pop band called Sirius B. After rehearsing for about six months and playing several gigs, their style did not match the punk rock which was surging in popularity in England and they broke up. Several years afterward, the three gathered together in London's East End under the name the Baseball Boys. They performed in and around England until a demo of theirs had them signed to Columbia/CBS Records in 1984.

Spinks adopted the name 'Baseball Boys' from a teen gang called "The Baseball Furies" in the cult film The Warriors, a movie he had just seen. Although he used the name as a joke and "just to be outrageous", record company people responded favourably. The band acquired a reputation as a very "American-sounding" group and signed in the United States after playing for just a few months in England. Their manager, an American living in England, recommended a new band name with a similar attitude since 'Baseball Boys' seemed too "tacky" and "tongue-in-cheek". Spinks said, "The Outfield was the most left-wing kind of thing we liked."

Spinks expressed an interest in baseball, while also being a devoted fan of association football. He claimed that the group "didn't know what an outfield was" until they visited the U.S. He said, "We're just learning about baseball. It's an acquired taste and we're trying to acquire a taste for it." He expounded in a Chicago Tribune article,

The thing about American sports–baseball and football–is that they're far more show business, far more a spectacle, than British sports. In England, it's just sort of everyday soccer matches. You get 30,000 people in the freezing cold in the middle of winter watching guys chase around in mud. In America, you have the sunny days, and the baseball diamond is really nicely laid out. In England, you'd see these guys covered in mud within 10 minutes. It's not such a nice spectacle to watch.

=== Play Deep ===
Their debut album, Play Deep produced by William Wittman, came out in 1985 and was a success. The album went triple platinum and was in the top 10 in US album charts; it also featured a top 10 single entry, "Your Love", which peaked at No. 6. The song was featured in a number of 80s-themed compilation albums, and over 1,000 covers and remixes by other artists have been released physically and/or online. The band toured extensively opening for Journey and Starship. Spinks made a point of mentioning in interviews that the band was "totally into not smoking or doing drugs".

=== Bangin’ ===
In 1987, Bangin,' their second album was released. The album did not achieve the acclaim of Play Deep, but it spawned a top 40 single, "Since You've Been Gone" (not to be confused with the 1970s Rainbow and Head East hit of the same name), which also hit No. 11 on the Billboard Mainstream Rock Songs chart. Furthermore, the Outfield had a minor radio/MTV hit with "No Surrender". The album sold reasonably well and was certified gold in the United States. A U.S. summer tour opening for Night Ranger followed.

=== Voices of Babylon ===
For the group's third album, 1989's Voices of Babylon, a new producer, David Kahne, and sound were adopted. The title track was a top 25 single and was No. 2 on the Billboard Mainstream Rock Songs chart. The follow-up song, "My Paradise", was a modest album-rock hit reaching No. 34 on the Billboard Mainstream Rock Songs chart, but overall the group's popularity continued to decline.

=== Diamond Days ===
After the Babylon LP, Alan Jackman parted ways with the band and was replaced for a concert tour by Paul Read. Spinks and Lewis continued as a duo, switched labels, and began recording Diamond Days for MCA (Music Corporation of America). Playing drums on the disc was session drummer Simon Dawson. The LP, released in 1990, produced a top 30 US hit, "For You". Quick to follow was "One Hot Country", included on the soundtrack to the 1991 action film If Looks Could Kill.

=== Later years and aftermath ===
The Outfield returned with 1992's Rockeye. Its leadoff single, "Closer to Me", was a hit, nearly making the top 40 and a second release, "Winning It All", gained some notice due to extensive play during the NBA Finals on NBC, the NBA Superstars series featuring Larry Bird, the 1992 Summer Olympics in Barcelona, the Chicago Bulls championship ring ceremonies, and the film The Mighty Ducks. Simon Dawson, who played on Rockeye, eventually became the band's official third member. The band took an extended hiatus during the mid-1990s as changing musical fashions, especially the popularity of edgier bands such as Nirvana and Pearl Jam, made life difficult for older bands with a less fashionable aesthetic.

The Outfield returned to their East End roots, often playing low-key gigs at a local public house, where much of the clientele were unaware that the group had sold millions of records in the US. Unfortunately, the situation was typical of the problems the Outfield had faced in their homeland: little recognition and a much smaller following than they had experienced in the US. Nevertheless, the band reappeared with a fan-club-only release, entitled It Ain't Over... and resumed touring. Soon thereafter in 1999, they released Extra Innings, an odds-and-ends compilation of new and older, unreleased songs.

In the early 2000s, the band released two live collections via their official website: Live in Brazil and The Outfield Live came out. In 2004, the band released Any Time Now, a new studio album through Tower Records, and later released a new version of the album in March 2006 through Sidewinder Records.

In 2009, the original lineup of John Spinks, Tony Lewis and Alan Jackman returned to recording in a London studio to record their first album together since Voices of Babylon was recorded in 1988. In addition, the Outfield announced that Brent Bitner had taken over the band's management and launched their official Facebook, Twitter, YouTube and Myspace pages in November 2009. On 22 March 2011, the Outfield announced their upcoming album would be called Replay. Replay was recorded in various studios in the south of England, which included production work at Abbey Road Studios. Replay was produced by the Outfield and Brent Bitner with executive production by John Spinks. On 28 June 2011, Replay was released to rave reviews. The lead single, "California Sun", was a regional number one AOR chart hit and has been the second most added song on AC radio as of 15 August 2011. A limited advanced release of the band's possible second single, "A Long, Long Time Ago", reached number one on Worldwide FM ClassX Radio's AOR chart in the second week of August 2011. In 2013, the band rerecorded vocals to their single "Your Love" to be incorporated into American DJ Morgan Page's reworking of the song, which was released in the summer of that year. Although credited to Page, the single was listed as featuring the Outfield.

On 9 July 2014, John Spinks died of liver cancer. He was 60 years old. After taking a few years off from music, lead singer/bassist Tony Lewis announced his return with a solo album, Out of the Darkness, which was released on 29 June 2018 through Madison Records and with the help of his wife Carol and their collaborative songwriting. A posthumous six song EP named More Than I Dared was released in November 2020. On 19 October 2020, singer Tony Lewis died suddenly and unexpectedly at his home near London, leaving Alan Jackman and Simon Dawson (who is now Iron Maiden's touring drummer) as the last surviving members.

== Style and influences ==
The Outfield were considered a pop rock, power pop, or a new wave group. Annelise Wamsley of the Tampa Bay Times said of the band's style in 1987, "the Outfield specializes in what you could call an early '80s American Sound. It's music by recipe: You take hyper-macho hard rock and tone it down so it will appeal to the over-17 set. You need a simple hook that can be repeated a dozen or so times, lots of electric guitar solos, a standard rock beat and basic lyrics." Indeed, the Outfield were so American-sounding (even taking their name from America's national pastime), they were much more popular in the U.S. than they were in their homeland. None of their albums made the UK charts, and only three of their singles could scratch their way onto the British singles listings (with "Voices of Babylon" peaking at #78).

John Spinks said in a 1986 interview with the Los Angeles Times that he was very influenced by "the music that gives me a rush" and that he "grew up on the Beatles". Interestingly, it was said that the band wanted to be a "car stereo sort of poppy version of the band Rush. "61 Seconds" and "Mystery Man" are evidence of this. He cited contemporaries Journey, Foreigner, and Mr. Mister–particularly the latter's hit "Broken Wings". In the interview, he expanded on the band's strong foundation in melody:

I love melodic music. [...] When you look at that music, you have to take it for what it is. I can write a pretty melody. That takes some talent. It may not be complicated and maybe it doesn't challenge anybody, but so what? Some people obviously like it. [...] You don't have to analyze my lyrics to understand them. You enjoy these songs or you don't. You can put these songs on while you're driving. They make you feel good. What more can you ask?

Wamsely made a similar remark, writing, "This is the stuff people listen to in their cars, on the way to work or play at high school dances." Criticism often centered on their generic sound. "The music is hopelessly, numbingly derivative of just about every Journey/Foreigner/Cars cliché in the book—with none of the style that makes those bands special," said Matt Damsker, rock critic for the Hartford Courant.

Yet, writing for the 1992 issue of the Rolling Stone Album guide, Paul Evans described The Outfield as "having an ambition no more complicated than to sound like a monster on the radio... it does".

== Members ==
- Tony Lewis – lead vocals, bass guitar (died 2020)
- John Spinks – guitar, keyboards, vocals (died 2014)
- Alan Jackman – drums, percussion (1984–1989, 2009–2014)
- Simon Dawson – drums (1989–2009)

== Discography ==
=== Studio albums ===
List of studio albums, with selected chart positions, sales figures and certifications
Year	Album details	Peak chart positions			Certifications
Year	Album details	US	CAN	NL	Certifications
1985	Play Deep: Released: 12 November 1985; Label: Columbia	9	21	43	RIAA: 2× Platinum; MC: Gold
1987	Bangin': Released: 12 June 1987; Label: Columbia	18	56	—	RIAA: Gold
1989	Voices of Babylon: Released: 28 March 1989; Label: Columbia	53	76	—	
1990	Diamond Days: Released: 30 October 1990; Label: MCA	90	35	—	
1992	Rockeye: Released: 31 March 1992; Label: MCA	—	—	—	
1998	It Ain't Over...: Released: 7 September 1998; Label: Warning Tracks	—	—	—	
1999	Extra Innings: Released: 27 July 1999; Label: Platinum Entertainment	—	—	—	
2004	Any Time Now: Released: 22 March 2004; Label: Tower	—	—	—	
2006	Any Time Now (2006 version): Released: 21 March 2006; Label: Sidewinder	—	—	—	
2011	Replay: Released: 28 June 2011; Label: Protocol Entertainment	—	—	—	
"—" denotes a recording that did not chart or was not released in that territory.

=== Compilations ===
- Playing the Field (1992)
- Big Innings: The Best of The Outfield (1996)
- Super Hits (1998)
- Demo and Rarities (2010)
- Playlist: The Very Best of The Outfield (2011)
- The Baseball Boys: Early Demos and Rare Tracks (2020)
- Final Innings (2021)

=== Live albums ===
- Live in Brazil (2001)
- The Outfield Live (2005)

=== Singles ===
List of singles, with selected chart positions and certifications, showing year released and album name
Title	Year	Peak chart positions						Certifications	Album
Title	Year	US Hot 100	US CB	US Rock	CAN	GER	UK	Certifications	Album
"Say It Isn't So"	1985	—	—	18	—	—	—		Play Deep
"Your Love"	1986	6	10	7	37	52	83	BPI: Gold; RMNZ: 3× Platinum	Play Deep
"All the Love in the World"	1986	19	19	14	—	—	96		Play Deep
"Everytime You Cry"	1986	66	57	20	—	—	—		Play Deep
"Since You've Been Gone"	1987	31	33	11	54	—	—		Bangin'
"Bangin' on My Heart"	1987	—	—	40	—	—	—		Bangin'
"Alone with You"	1987	—	—	—	—	—	—		Bangin'
"No Surrender"	1987	—	—	—	—	—	—		Bangin'
"Voices of Babylon"	1989	25	26	2	39	57	78		Voices of Babylon
"My Paradise"	1989	72	—	34	94	—	—		Voices of Babylon
"The Night Ain't Over"	1989	—	—	—	—	—	—		Voices of Babylon
"Part of Your Life"	1989	—	—	—	—	—	—		Voices of Babylon
"For You"	1990	21	22	13	11	—	—		Diamond Days
"Take It All"	1991	—	106	—	70	—	—		Diamond Days
"Closer to Me"	1992	43	31	46	78	—	—		Rockeye
"Winning It All"	1992	—	104	—	94	—	—		Rockeye
"The Way It Should Be" (album cut)	1992	—	106	—	—	—	—		Rockeye
"Going Back"	1992	—	—	—	—	—	—		Rockeye
"It's All About Love"	2003	—	—	—	—	—	—		Any Time Now
"California Sun"	2011	—	—	—	—	—	—		Replay
"A Long, Long Time Ago"	2011	—	—	—	—	—	—		Replay
"A Little Piece of Luck"	2011	—	—	—	—	—	—		Replay
"—" denotes a recording that did not chart or was not released in that territory.

==== Featured singles ====
List of singles, showing year released and album name
Title	Year	Peak chart positions		Album
Title	Year	US	UK	Album
"Your Love" (Extended Mix) (Morgan Page featuring the Outfield)	2013	–	—	Non-album single
"Your Love” (Remix) (The Outfield, Diplo)	2024	–	—	Non-album single
"—" denotes a recording that did not chart or was not released in that territory.

=== Music videos ===
List of music videos, with directors, showing year released
Title	Year	Director(s)
"Say It Isn't So"	1985	Andrew Morahan
"Your Love"	1986	Jon Jopson
"All the Love in the World"	1986	David Fincher
"Everytime You Cry"	1986	David Fincher
"Since You've Been Gone"	1987	Wayne Isham
"No Surrender"	1987	David Fincher
"Voices of Babylon"	1989	Alex Proyas
"My Paradise"	1989	Eric Watson
"For You"	1990	Michael Geoghegan
