= Since You've Been Gone (The Outfield song) =

1987 single by the Outfield

Single by the Outfield

from the album Bangin'
- B-side: "Better Than Nothing"
- Released: May 1987
- Recorded: 1986; Air Studios (London)
- Genre: Pop rock; power pop
- Length: 3:58
- Label: Columbia
- Songwriter: John Spinks
- Producer: William Wittman

The Outfield singles chronology
"Everytime You Cry" (1986)	"Since You've Been Gone" (1987)	"Bangin' on My Heart" (1987)

"Since You've Been Gone" is a song by the English rock band the Outfield. It was the lead single from their sophomore studio album, Bangin' (1987), released on Columbia Records. The single was released in May 1987. In the U.S., the song hit number 11 on the Billboard's Album Rock Tracks chart and number 31 on the Billboard Hot 100. It was the best-performing single from Bangin’.

Of particular note is the filming location of the video: the disused Beckton Gas Works outside of London was selected and the entire video was shot there. The damage to the buildings was done weeks prior to shooting, as the location had also been used for the filming of Stanley Kubrick's Full Metal Jacket, particularly the Huế sequence.

== Charts ==
Chart (1987)	Peak position
Canada Top Singles (RPM)	54
US Billboard Hot 100	31
US Album Rock Tracks (Billboard)	11
