= St Helena Hospice =

Hospice charity

- St Helena Hospice logo

- Location within Essex
- Formation: 11 August 1980
- Type: British hospice charity
- Purpose: End-of-life care
- Headquarters: Colchester, Essex
- Location: Colchester
- Coordinates: 51.907796°N 0.914719°E
- Region served: North-east Essex
- Co-Chief Executive: Karen Chumbley; Kate Heslegrave
- Staff: 348 (2024)
- Volunteers: Around 900
- Website: www.sthelena.org.uk

St Helena Hospice is an independent hospice charity based in Colchester, Essex, providing end-of-life care for people in north-east Essex. They operate 24 shops across north-east Essex.

Around 4,500 people use the charity's services every year of which less than 10% become inpatients. According to the former Chief Executive Mark Jarman-Howe the charity needs about £22 million a year to function.

== Services ==
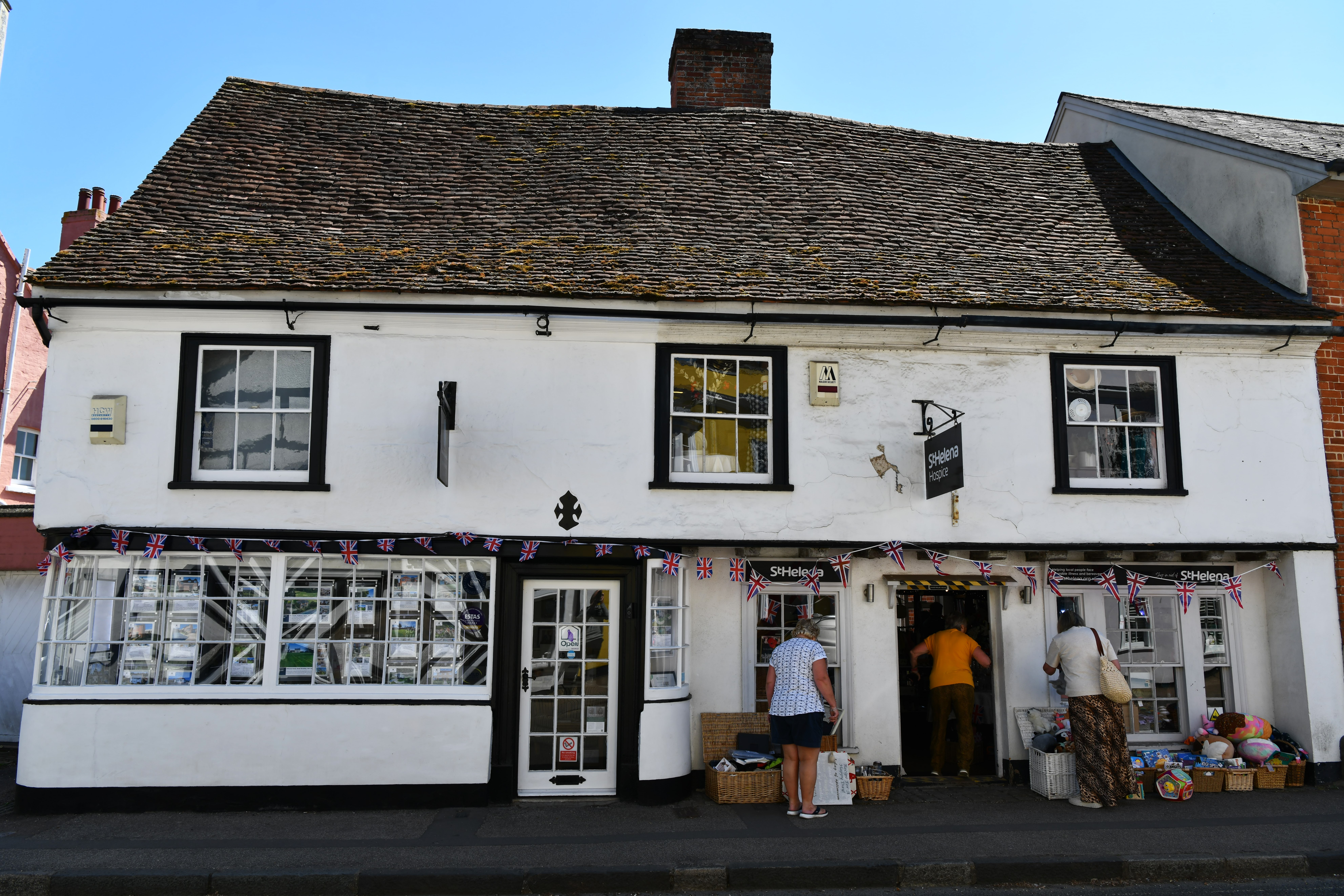
St. Helena Hospice charity shop, Essex

Care at Saint Helena is offered via inpatient hospice care, home care, counselling and bereavement support for adults and children, and coordination services for end-of-life care in the region. Total Clean is a subsidiary of St Helena Hospice offering cleaning services.

== History ==
On 6 July 1979, a public meeting was held to discuss creating a hospice in Colchester. The meeting included doctors, nurses, civic leaders and about 140 members of the public. The group was lead mainly by Dr Elizabeth Hall, Deirdre Allen, Dr Peter Kennedy, and Dr George Rhys Lewis.

On 17 May 1980, a £250,000 public fundraising appeal was launched and the organisation would be named after Saint Helena. On 11 August 1980, the organisation was formally incorporated as St Helena Hospice Limited. The hospice opened on 20 May 1985 and admitted its first patient. It was officially opened by Queen Elizabeth the Queen Mother on 11 April 1986. In April 1988, Diana, Princess of Wales met with local benefactor Robin Tomkins at the hospice to open a new day centre built in memory of his late wife, Joan.

From 2013 till September 2025, the hospice was run by Mark Jarman-Howe as CEO. In August 2025, Karen Chumbley and Kate Heslegrave were appointed as Co-Chief Executives.

== Fundraisers ==
St Helena Hospice hosted its first half-marathon, a 13.1 miles (21.1 km) race in Harwich on 7 September 2025 raising £70,000 with 670 people participating. That same month, a group called the "Wrinkled Wheels" cycled from Land's End to John o'Groats, about 1000 miles.
