= All the Love (The Outfield song) =

1986 single by the Outfield

Single by the Outfield

from the album Play Deep
- B-side: "Taking My Chances"
- Released: May 1986
- Recorded: 1985
- Studio: Air Studios (London)
- Genre: New wave; pop rock; power pop; dream pop
- Length: 3:33
- Label: Columbia
- Songwriter: John Spinks
- Producer: William Wittman

The Outfield singles chronology
"Your Love" (1986)	"All the Love" (1986)	"Everytime You Cry" (1986)

Music video
- "All The Love" on YouTube

"All the Love", also known as "All the Love in the World", is a song by English rock band the Outfield. It was the third single from their debut studio album, Play Deep (1985), released on Columbia Records. The single followed the band's biggest hit, "Your Love", and was released in May 1986. In the U.S., the song hit number 14 on the Billboard Album Rock Tracks chart and number 19 on the Billboard Hot 100.

== Charts ==
Chart (1986)	Peak position
UK Singles (OCC)	96
US Billboard Hot 100	19
US Mainstream Rock (Billboard)	14
