= John Spinks (musician) =

British musician (1953–2014)

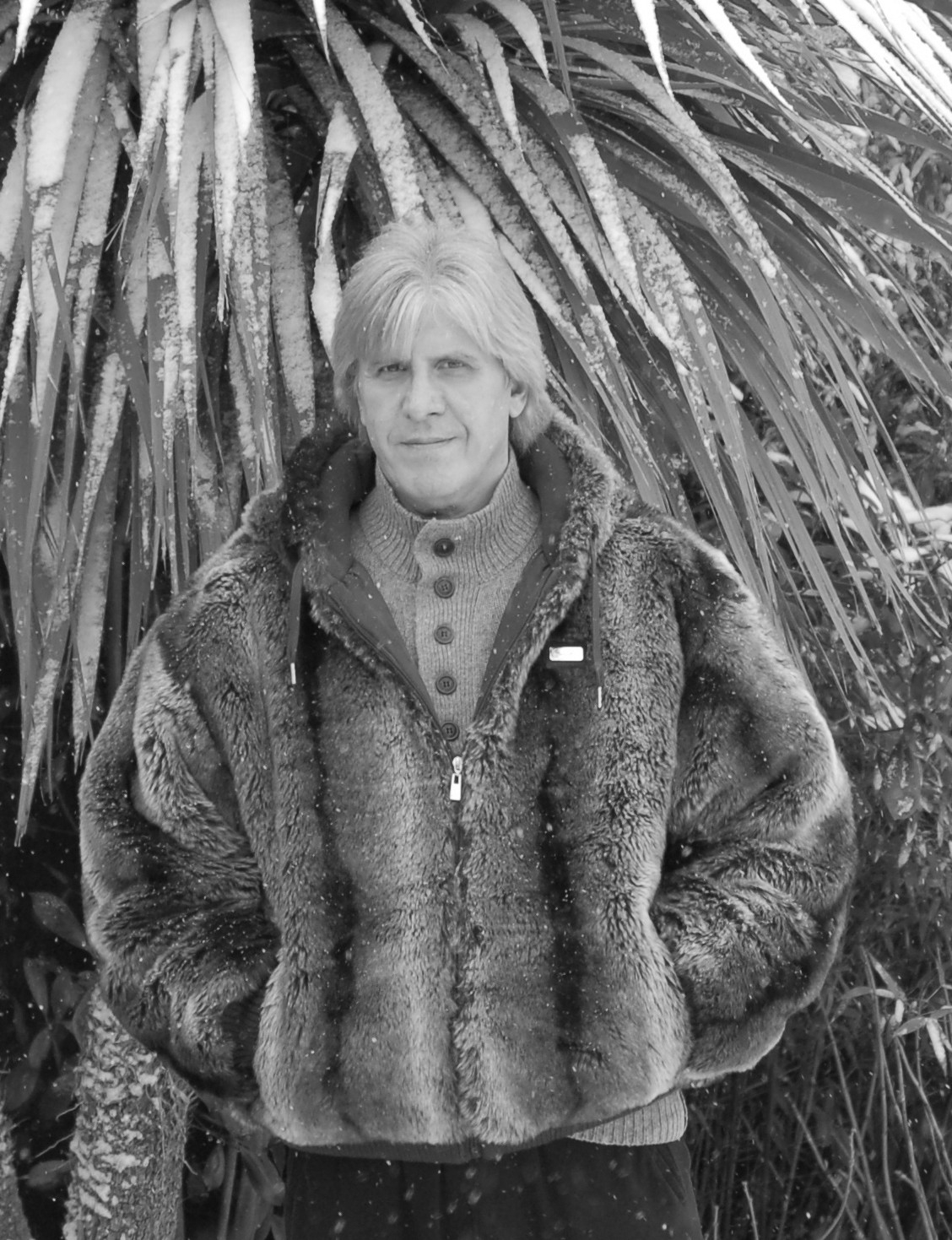
- Spinks in 2009

Background information
- Born: John Frederick Spinks; 28 November 1953; Poplar, London, England
- Died: 9 July 2014 (aged 60) Kent, England
- Genres: Pop rock, power pop, new wave
- Occupations: Musician, songwriter
- Instruments: Guitar, keyboards, vocals
- Years active: 1984–2014
- Formerly of: The Outfield

John Frederick Spinks (28 November 1953 − 9 July 2014) was an English musician and songwriter. He was best known as the guitarist and songwriter for the Outfield.

== Early life and career ==
John Spinks was born on 28 November 1953 in Poplar in the East End of London. Spinks, Tony Lewis, and Alan Jackman first played together in the 1970s band Sirius B. After rehearsing for six months, the group disbanded due to the advent of punk rock. In the 1980s, Spinks recorded several demos under the name Baseball Boys, a name chosen because it closely resembled a gang called the Baseball Furies from the film The Warriors. "Just to be outrageous, I put what I felt was a stupid name on the demos," said Spinks, "and the people I took them to said, `Sounds great. Can we see the band?` And there wasn't really a band." Spinks joined together with Lewis and Jackman to perform as Baseball Boys, and then changed their name to the Outfield in 1984. Their debut album, Play Deep, became a multiplatinum-selling smash upon release in 1985. Spinks wrote the band's biggest hit, "Your Love", which reached the top 10 on the Billboard Hot 100 in 1986. The Outfield went on hiatus in the 1990s but reconvened to record Replay in 2011.

== Death ==
Spinks died on 9 July 2014, aged 60, after having liver cancer for years. He was survived by his wife, Jean Spinks, and their two children, Lee and Paul. Spinks and the band wrote new material shortly before his death, but it is unclear whether it will be released.
